= 1951–52 Indian general election in Bihar =

Indian general election in Bihar, 1951-52
- November 1951

55 (of 489) seats in the Lok Sabha
- Registered: 18,080,181
- Turnout: 9,992,451 (40.35%)
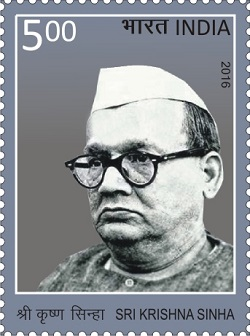

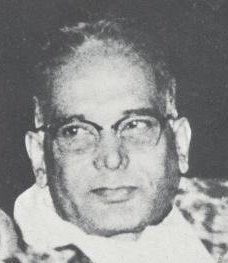
	First party	Second party
Leader	Shri Krishna Sinha	Jayaprakash Narayan
Party	Indian National Congress	Socialist Party
Leader's seat	Did not contest	Did not contest
Seats won	45	3
Popular vote	4,573,058	2,126,066
Percentage	45.77%	21.28%
- state of Bihar in 1951-52
Prime Minister before election
Jawaharlal Nehru
INC
Prime Minister after election
Jawaharlal Nehru
INC

The 1951–52 Indian general election in Bihar was held as part of the first general election in independent India to elect members to the 1st Lok Sabha. Polling was conducted between 1951 and 1952 under the supervision of the Election Commission of India using the first-past-the-post electoral system.

The undivided state of Bihar elected 55 members to the 1st Lok Sabha from 44 parliamentary constituencies, comprising 31 single-member, 11 double-member and two single-member Scheduled Tribe constituencies. The Indian National Congress (INC) secured a decisive victory in the state, winning 45 of the 55 seats.

== Background ==
The election was the first parliamentary election held after the Constitution of India came into force on 26 January 1950. It marked the introduction of universal adult suffrage, allowing every Indian citizen aged 21 years or above to vote regardless of religion, caste, gender or property qualifications.

The election in Bihar was conducted in both single-member and double-member parliamentary constituencies. Double-member constituencies returned two representatives, generally one from the general category and one from a reserved category, a system that remained in use until it was abolished before the 1962 Indian general election.

=== Electoral system ===
Bihar elected 55 members to the 1st Lok Sabha from 44 parliamentary constituencies.

Election Statistics
Members elected	55
Parliamentary constituencies	44
Single-member constituencies	31
Double-member constituencies	11
Single-member Scheduled Tribe constituencies	2
Total electors	18,080.181
Votes polled	9,992,451
Voter turnout	40.35%
Total candidates	198
Average candidates per constituency	5
Candidates forfeiting deposits	67

== Results ==
A total of 55 members were elected from 44 parliamentary constituencies. The Indian National Congress won 45 seats, securing an overwhelming majority in Bihar. The Socialist Party, Jharkhand Party, Lok Sevak Sangh, Chota Nagpur Santhal Parganas Janta Party and an Independent candidate won the remaining seats.

=== Party-wise results ===
Party	Votes	%	Seats
Indian National Congress	4,573,058	45.77	45
Socialist Party	2,126,066	21.28	3
Jharkhand Party	749,702	7.50	3
Lok Sewak Sangh	309,940	3.10	2
Chota Nagpur Santhal Parganas Janata Party	236,094	2.36	1
Independents	1,306,660	13.08	1
Other parties	690,931	6.91	0
Total	9,992,451	100.00	55
Source: ECI

=== By constituency ===
Constituency		Turnout	Seat No.	Winner		Runner-up	
Constituency		Turnout	Seat No.	Candidate	Party	Candidate	Party
1	Pataliputra	133,645	1	Sarangdhar Sinha	INC	Gyan Chand	SP
2	Patna Central	131,506	2	Kailash Pati Sinha	INC	Chandrika Singh	IND
3	Patna East	132,716	3	Tarkeshwari Devi	INC	B. P. Jawahar	SP
4	Patna cum Shahabad	136,851	4	Bali Ram Bhagat	INC	Devendra Prasad Singh	SP
5	Gaya East	415,816	5	Brajeshwar Prasad	INC	Raksha Ram	SP
5	Gaya East	415,816	6	Ramdhari Das	INC	Gopal Krishna Mahajan	SP
6	Gaya North	127,767	7	Bigeshwar Missir	SP	Jagannath Prasad Sinha	INC
7	Gaya West	141,212	8	Satyendra Narayan Sinha	INC	Bilash Singh	SP
8	Shahabad South	584,689	9	Ram Subhag Singh	INC	Radha Mohan Singh	SP
8	Shahabad South	584,689	10	Jagjivan Ram	INC	Chhattu Dusadh	SP
9	Shahabad North West	150,612	11	Kamal Singh	IND	Kalawati	INC
10	Saran North	111,627	12	Jhulan Sinha	INC	Vidyabhushan Shukla	IND
11	Saran Central	121,823	13	Mahendra Nath Singh	INC	Sukdeo Prasad	SP
12	Saran East	104,790	14	Satya Narain Singh	INC	Kanhaiya Prasad Verma	SP
13	Saran South	117,340	15	Dwarka Nath Tiwary	INC	Rajendra Singh	SP
14	Saran cum Champaran	438,883	16	Bibhuti Mishra	INC	Jagat Nath	SP
14	Saran cum Champaran	438,883	17	Bhola Raut	INC	Shatrughan Ram	SP
15	Champaran North	104,179	18	Bipin Bihari Verma	INC	Shattru Mardan Sah	IND
16	Champaran East	138,767	19	Syed Mahmood	Inc	Jai Gopal Sinha	SP
17	Muzaffarpur North West	134,435	20	Chandeswar Narain Prasad Sinha	INC	Baijnath Pd. Verma	SP
18	Muzaffarpur North East	154,884	21	Digvijay Narain Singh	INC	Ram Bahadur Lal	SP
19	Muzaffarpur Central	141,330	22	Shyam Nandan Sahay	INC	Radha Mohan Shukla	SP
20	Muzafarpur East	139,632	23	Awadeshwar Prasad Sinha	INC	Ram Janam Ojha	SP
21	Muzaffarpur cum Darbhanga	318,538	24	Rameshwar Sahu	INC	UNOPPOSED	N/A
21	Muzaffarpur cum Darbhanga	318,538	25	Rajeshwar Patel	INC	Ram Chander Sharma	SP
22	Samastipur East	122,946	26	Satya Narain Sinha	INC	Badri Narain Sinha	SP
23	Darbhanga Central	136,243	27	Narayan Das	INC	Ramnandan Mishra	SP
24	Darbhanga East	132,722	28	Aniruydh Sinha	INC	Lakshman Jha	SP
25	Darbhanga North	167,758	29	Shyam Nandan Prasad	INC	Kameshwar Singh	IND
26	Darbhanga cum Bhagalpur	146,291	30	Lalit Narayan Mishra	INC	Tapeshwari Mandal	SP
27	Monghyr Sadar cum Jamui	518,714	31	Banarsi Prasad Sinha	INC	Ram Kishun Lal	SP
27	Monghyr Sadar cum Jamui	518,714	32	Nayan Tara Das	INC	Rameshwar Yadav	SP
28	Monghyr North West	115,332	33	Mathura Prasad Mishra	INC	Brahamdeo Pd. Sinha	SP
29	Monghyr North East	146,688	34	Suresh Chandra Mishra	SP	Rajendra Prasad Yadav	INC
30	Bhagalpur cum Purnea	512,765	35	Anup Lal Mehta (Note: A by-election was held in the Bhagalpur cum Purnea parliamentary constituency in 1952. J. B. Kripalani of the Praja Socialist Party was elected to one of the constituency's two seats, while Kirai Mushahar was returned unopposed to the reserved seat, altering the constituency's representation during the First Lok Sabha.)	INC	Murlidhari Singh	SP
30	Bhagalpur cum Purnea	512,765	36	Kirai Mushahar	SP	Mahabir Das	INC
31	Bhagalpur Central	145,939	37	Banarshi Prasad Jhunjhunwala	INC	Sahajanand Kumar	SP
32	Bhagalpur South	144,686	38	Susama Sen	INC	Baijnath Prasad Singh	SP
33	Purnea North East	120,467	39	Muhammad Islamuddin	INC	Krishna Lal Therari	IND
34	Purnea Central	138,412	40	Phani Gopal Sen Gupta	INC	Durga Prasad	IND
35	Purnea cum Santal Parganas	659,217	41	Jughar Soren Paul	JHP	Narayan Soren	INC
35	Purnea cum Santal Parganas	659,217	42	Bhagat Jha (Azad)	INC	Sudhir Hasda	JHP
36	Santal Parganas cum Hazaribagh	634,118	43	Lal Hembrom	INC	Bariar Hembrom	IND
36	Santal Parganas cum Hazaribagh	634,118	44	Ram Raj Jajware	INC	Suresh Chandra Chowdhry	IND
37	Hazaribhag East	129,617	45	Nageshwar Prasad Sinha	INC	Tara Kishore Prasad	CNSPJP
38	Hazaribhag West	118,881	46	Ram Narayan Singh	CNSPJP	Jhani Ram	INC
39	Ranchi North East	133,505	47	Abdul Ibrahim	INC	Ajit Nath Banerjee	SP
40	Ranchi West (ST)	228,856	48	Jaipal Singh	JHP	Jagannath Singh Manki	INC
41	Palamau cum Hazaribagh cum Ranchi	463,405	49	Gajendra Prasad Sinha	INC	Alis Kujur	JHP
41	Palamau cum Hazaribagh cum Ranchi	463,405	50	Jithan Kherwar	INC	Jhawan Singh	JHP
42	Manbhum North	435,123	51	Prabhat Chandra Bose	INC	Nakul Sahis	LSS
42	Manbhum North	435,123	52	Mohan Hari	INC	Gupta Bibhuti Bhushan Das	LSS
43	Manbhum South cum Dhalbhum	481,518	53	Bhajahari Mahato	LSS	Dasarath Murmu	JHP
43	Manbhum South cum Dhalbhum	481,518	54	Chaitan Manjhi	LSS	M. John	INC
44	Chailbassa (ST)	178,206	55	Kanu Ram Deogam	JHP	Purno Chandra Birua	IND

1. Source: ECI

== Aftermath ==
The members elected in the 1951–52 general election constituted Bihar's representation in the 1st Lok Sabha, which sat from 17 April 1952 until its dissolution on 4 April 1957. The next general election in the state was held in 1957. During the First Lok Sabha, Socialist Party MP Bigeshwar Missir moved the first no-confidence motion against the Speaker of the Lok Sabha, G. V. Mavalankar, in 1954. Jharkhand Party leader Jaipal Singh Munda continued to advocate the creation of a separate Jharkhand state comprising the tribal-majority areas of southern Bihar. During the First Lok Sabha, he repeatedly raised the issue in Parliament, bringing the regional statehood movement to national attention.

Following the delimitation carried out during 1952-53 on the basis of the 1951 Census, Bihar's parliamentary constituencies were extensively reorganised for the before the 1957 general election. The state's representation in the Lok Sabha was reduced from 55 to 53, while several constituency boundaries and names were revised, replacing many of the parliamentary constituencies used in the 1951–52 election.

== See also ==
- 1951–52 Indian general election
- 1st Lok Sabha
- Elections in Bihar
- 1952 Bihar Legislative Assembly election
