= Elections in Bihar =

Location of the state of Bihar (in red) within India

Elections in the Indian state of Bihar, are conducted in accordance with the Constitution of India. The Assembly of Bihar creates laws regarding the conduct of local body elections unilaterally while any changes by the state legislature to the conduct of state level elections need to be approved by the Parliament of India.

Elections to the Lok Sabha, also termed as General Elections, are typically held every 5 years after the central government has completed its term. It may also be held before the completion of term if parliament is dissolved early. Similarly, elections to Legislative Assembly are conducted every five years. Last Lok Sabha election was held in 2024 and Legislative Assembly election was held in 2025. Elections to the Rajya Sabha are held at regular interval with one third of the members retiring in a staggered manner. Members of Legislative Assembly elect the state's representative to Rajya Sabha.

== Bihar electoral system ==
The elections to the Lok Sabha and Legislative Assembly are conducted along similar lines with the major difference being size of constituencies. At present each Lok Sabha constituency consists of 6 Legislative Assembly constituency. Each constituency elects a single member to represent them via a First Past the Post System, where a candidate with plurality of total votes cast is elected.

Currently the major parties in the state are Bharatiya Janata Party, Indian National Congress, Janata Dal (United), Rashtriya Janata Dal and Lok Janshakti Party (Ram Vilas), Rashtriya Lok Morcha and Rashtriya Lok Janshakti Party. The state was dominated by Indian National Congress until the decade of 1970s with parties like BJP and Janata Dal gaining prominence. For the purpose of elections every party is assigned a symbol to help voters in recognizing the candidate they support.

=== National level representation ===
==== Lok Sabha delegation ====
Currently, the state of Bihar sends 40 representatives to the Lok Sabha, elected through a first past the post system. The Indian general election, 2019 in Bihar were held for 40 seats with the state going to polls in the first seven phases of the general elections. The major contenders in the state were the National Democratic Alliance (NDA) and United Progressive Alliance (UPA). NDA consisted of the Bharatiya Janata Party (BJP), Janata Dal (United) and the Lok Jan Shakti Party (LJP) whereas the United Progressive Alliance was constituted of the Rashtriya Janata Dal (RJD), the Indian National Congress (INC) and other minor parties.

==== Rajya Sabha delegation ====
Both the houses of the state legislature jointly nominate Members of Parliament to the Rajya Sabha. The Rajya Sabha or Council of States is the upper house of the Parliament of India. Membership of Rajya Sabha is limited by the Constitution to a maximum of 250 members, and current laws have provision for 245 members. Most of the members of the House are indirectly elected by state and territorial legislatures using single transferable votes, while the President of India can appoint 12 members for their contributions to art, literature, science, and social services. Members sit for staggered six-year terms, with one third of the members retiring every two years.

=== State level representation ===
==== Legislative assembly ====
Bihar legislature assembly has 243 seats. For the election of its members, the state is divided into 243 Assembly Constituencies in which the candidate securing the largest number of votes is declared elected. In the 2010 Bihar Legislative Assembly election, the National Democratic Alliance formed the state government having secured a simple majority of 206 seats. Bihar Legislative Assembly came into existence in 1937. The Assembly had a strength of 152 members. According to the provisions of the Constitution of India, the first General Elections in the state were held in 1952. The total strength of membership in the Assembly was 331, including one nominated member. Dr Sri Krishna Singh became the first Leader of the house and the Chief Minister and Dr Anurag Narayan Sinha was elected the first deputy leader of the assembly and became state's first Deputy Chief Minister. It was reduced to 318 during the second General Elections. In 1977, the total number of elected members of the Bihar Legislative Assembly was further raised from 318 to 324. With the creation of a separate State of Jharkhand, by an Act of Parliament titled the Bihar Reorganisation Act, 2000, the strength of the Bihar Legislative Assembly was reduced from 325 to 243 members. The current Samrat Choudhary government is a coalition, powered by the JD(U) and LJP to majority status

==== Legislative Council ====
The upper house known as the Legislative Council has lesser powers than the Assembly and several of its members are nominated by the Assembly. Others are elected from various sections of the society like Graduates and Teachers. Currently the Legislative Council consists of 95 members. A new Province of Bihar and Orissa was created by the British Government on 12 December 1911. The Legislative Council with a total of 43 members belonging to different categories was formed in 1912. The first sitting of the council was convened on 20 January 1913. In 1936, Bihar attained its separate Statehood. Under the Government of India Act, 1919, the unicameral legislature got converted into bicameral one, i.e. the Bihar Legislative Council and the Bihar Legislative Assembly. Under the Government of India Act, 1935, the Bihar Legislative Council consisted of 29 members. After the first General Elections 1952, the number of members was increased up to 72 and by 1958 the number was raised to 96. With the creation of Jharkhand, as a result of the Bihar Reorganisation Act, 2000 passed by the Parliament, the strength of the Bihar Legislative Council has been reduced from 96 to 75 members

== History of elections in Bihar ==
=== Assembly election ===
Year	Election	Party-wise Details	Chief Minister	Party
1952	First Assembly	Total: 276. INC: 239, JP: 32, SPI:23	Shri Krishna Sinha	INC
1957	Second Assembly	Total: 318. INC: 210, PSP: 31, JP: 31	Shri Krishna Sinha (Till 1961); Deep Narayan Singh; Binodanand Jha	INC
1962	Third Assembly	Total: 264. INC: 185, SWA: 50, PSP 29, JP: 20, CPI: 12, SPI: 7, BJS: 3	Binodanand Jha; Krishna Ballabh Sahay	INC
1967	Fourth Assembly	Total: 318. INC: 128, SSP: 68, BJS: 26	Mahamaya Prasad Sinha; Satish Prasad Singh; B. P. Mandal; Bhola Paswan Shashtri	INC; BJS; INC(O)
1969	Fifth Assembly	Total: 318. SSP: 53, BJS: 34	President's rule Harihar Singh; Bhola Paswan Shashtri; Daroga Prasad Rai; Karpuri Thakur	None
1972	Sixth Assembly	Total: 318. INC: 167, CPI: 35, SP: 34	Kedar Pandey; Abdul Gafoor; Jagannath Mishra	INC
1977	Seventh Assembly	Total: 318. JP: 214, INC: 57, CPI: 21, Independent: 25	Karpuri Thakur; Ram Sunder Das	JP
1980	Eighth Assembly	Total: 324. INC: 169, JP: 42, CPI: 23	Jagannath Mishra; Chandrashekhar Singh	INC
1985	Ninth Assembly	Total: 324. INC: 196, LK: 46, BJP: 16, JP: 13, CPI: 12, JMM: 9, CPI(M): 1, IC(S): 1, SUCI(C): 1, Independent: 29	Bindeshwari Dubey; Bhagwat Jha Azad; Satyendra Narayan Singh; Jagannath Mishra	INC
1990	Tenth Assembly	Total: 324. JD: 122, INC: 71, BJP: 39	Lalu Prasad Yadav	JD
1995	Eleventh Assembly	Total: 324. JD: 167, BJP: 41, INC: 29	Lalu Prasad Yadav; Rabri Devi	JD
2000	Twelfth Assembly	Total: 243. JD: 124, BJP: 67, SP: 34, Congress: 23	Rabri Devi	JD
February 2005	Thirteenth Assembly	Total: 243. NDA: (JD(U):55 + BJP:37), RJD: 75 + INC: 10	President's rule	None
October 2005	Fourteenth Assembly	Total: 243. NDA: (JD(U):88 + BJP:55), RJD: 54 + INC: 10, LJP: 10	Nitish Kumar	JD(U)
2010	Fifteenth Assembly	Total: 243. NDA: (JD(U):115 + BJP:91), RJD: 22 + LJP: 3, INC: 4	Nitish Kumar; Jitan Ram Manjhi	JD(U)
2015	Sixteenth Assembly	Total: 243. JD(U): 71, BJP:53, LJP: 2, UPA: (RJD:80 + INC:27)	Nitish Kumar	JD(U)
2020	Seventeenth Assembly	Total: 243. NDA: (BJP:74 + JD(U):45 + VIP:4 + HAM(S):4), MGB: (RJD:75 + INC:19 + CPI-ML(L):12 + CPI:2 + CPI(M):2) GDSF: (AIMIM:5 + BSP:1), LJP: 1, Independent: 1	Nitish Kumar	JD(U)
2025	Eighteenth Assembly	Total: 243. NDA: 202 (BJP: 89 JD(U): 85 LJP(RV): 19 HAM(S): 5 RLM:4), MGB: 35 (RJD: 25 INC: 6 CPI-ML(L): 2 CPI(M): 1 IIP: 1), AIMIM: 5, BSP: 1	Nitish Kumar(till 14 April 2025); Samrat Choudhary(From 15 April 2026)	JD(U); BJP

=== 2025 Municipal bypolls and introduction of mobile voting ===
In June 2025, Bihar become the first state in India to implement mobile phone-based e-voting in municipal bypolls and elections in six Nagar Panchayats in districts such as Patna, Rohtas, Buxar, and East Champaran. The facility, introduced by the Bihar State Election Commission with the Centre for Development of Advanced Computing (C-DAC), was made available to eligible pregnant women, senior citizens, migrant workers and persons with disabilities. Voters could cast their votes from home using the E-SECBHR app. The system used security measures including blockchain encryption, facial recognition, voter ID verification, and device restrictions. According to officials, 70.20% of registered voters used the mobile e-voting system, compared to a turnout of 54.6% at traditional polling booths. The first e-vote in Indian electoral history was cast by Bibha Kumari of Pakridayal, East Champaran.

== Lok Sabha Elections ==
Lok Sabha constituencies in Bihar

Araria · Arrah · Aurangabad · Banka · Begusarai · Bhagalpur · Buxar · Darbhanga · Gaya · Gopalganj · Hajipur · Jahanabad · Jamui · Jhanjharpur · Karakat · Katihar · Khagaria · Kishanganj · Madhepura · Madhubani · Maharajganj · Munger · Muzaffarpur · Nalanda · Nawada · Paschim Champaran · Pataliputra · Patna Sahib · Purnia · Purvi Champaran · Samastipur · Saran · Sasaram · Sheohar · Sitamarhi · Siwan · Supaul · Ujiarpur · Vaishali · Valmiki Nagar

- 1951-1984

Election Year	#	Total Seats	Congress (INC)	Others	PM elect	PM's Party
1951–52	1st Lok Sabha	55	45	Party name / Seats won; SP / 3; IND / 1; Others / 6	Jawaharlal Nehru	INC
1957	2nd Lok Sabha	53	41	Party name / Seats won; PSP / 2; JKP / 6; IND / 1; Others / 3	Jawaharlal Nehru	INC
1962	3rd Lok Sabha	53	39	Party name / Seats won; SWA / 7; JP / 3; Others / 4	Jawaharlal Nehru	INC
1967	4th Lok Sabha	53	34	Party name / Seats won; SSP / 7; CPI / 5; IND / 4; Others / 3	Indira Gandhi	INC
1971	5th Lok Sabha	54	39	Party name / Seats won; CPI / 5; INC(O) / 3; IND / 1; Others / 5	Indira Gandhi	INC
1977	6th Lok Sabha	54	-	Party name / Seats won; JP / 52; Others / 2	Morarji Desai	JP
1980	7th Lok Sabha	54	30	Party name / Seats won; JNP / 8; JNP(S) / 5; INC(U) / 4; CPI / 4; Others / 3	Indira Gandhi	INC
1984	8th Lok Sabha	54	48	Party name / Seats won; CPI / 2; Others / 4	Rajiv Gandhi	INC

1989-1999

Total Seats- 54

Election Year	Lok Sabha	1st Party	2nd Party	3rd Party	4th Party	Others	Prime Minister	PM's Party
1989	9th Lok Sabha	JD 32	BJP 8	INC 4	CPI 4	JMM 4	V.P. Singh	JD
1991	10th Lok Sabha	JD 31	CPI 8	JMM 6	BJP 5	INC 1, CPI(M) 1	P. V. Narasimha Rao	INC
1996	11th Lok Sabha	JD 22	BJP 18	SMP 6	CPI 3	INC 2, SP 1, JMM 1, Ind 1		JD
1998	12th Lok Sabha	BJP 19	RJD 17	SMP 10	INC 4		Atal Bihari Vajpayee	BJP
1999	13th Lok Sabha	BJP 23	JD(U) 18	RJD 7	INC 4	CPI(M) 1, Ind 1	Atal Bihari Vajpayee	BJP

=== After 2000 ===
Total Seats- 40

Election Year	Lok Sabha	1st Party	2nd Party	3rd Party	4th Party	Others	Prime Minister	PM's Party
2004	14th Lok Sabha	RJD 22	JD(U) 6	BJP 5	LJP 4	INC 3	Manmohan Singh	INC
2009	15th Lok Sabha	JD(U) 20	BJP 12	RJD 4	INC 2	Ind 2	Manmohan Singh	INC
2014	16th Lok Sabha	BJP 22	LJP 6	RJD 4	RLSP 3	JD(U) 2, INC 2, NCP 1	Narendra Modi	BJP
2019	17th Lok Sabha	BJP 17	JD(U) 16	LJP 6	INC 1		Narendra Modi	BJP
2024	18th Lok Sabha	BJP 12	JD(U) 12	LJP(RV) 5	RJD 4	INC 3, CPI(ML)L 2, Ind 1	Narendra Modi	BJP

== Electoral process ==
=== Pre elections ===
The Election Commission's Model Code of Conduct enters into force as soon as the notification for polls is issued. This places restrictions on the campaigning by political parties as well as prohibits certain government actions that would unduly influence the election.

=== Voting day ===
The electoral process in Bihar follows the national model, with Electronic Voting Machines (EVMs) used for all Lok Sabha and Assembly elections. In 2025, however, the state has also piloted mobile phone–based voting in selected municipal elections.

=== Post elections ===
After the election day, the EVMs are stored in a strong room under heavy security. After the different phases of the elections are complete, a day is set to count the votes. The votes are tallied and typically, the verdict is known within hours. The candidate who has mustered the most votes is declared the winner of the constituency.

The party or coalition that has won the most seats is invited by the Governor to form the new government. The coalition or party must prove its majority in the floor of the house (Legislative Assembly) in a vote of confidence by obtaining a simple majority (minimum 50%) of the votes in the House.

== Voter registration ==
For few cities in Bihar, the voter registration forms can be generated online and submitted to the nearest electoral office.

== Absentee voting ==
As of now, India does not have an absentee ballot system. Section 19 of The Representation of the People Act (RPA)-1950 allows a person to register to vote if he or she is above 18 years of age and is an ‘ordinary resident’ of the residing constituency i.e. living at the current address for 6 months or longer. Section 20 of the above Act disqualifies a non-resident Indian (NRI) from getting his/her name registered in the electoral rolls. Consequently, it also prevents an NRI from casting his/her vote in elections to the Parliament and to the State Legislatures.

The Representation of the People (Amendment) 2006 Bill was introduced in the Parliament by Shri Hanraj Bharadwaj, Minister of Law and Justice during February 2006 with an objective to amend Section 20 of the RPA-1950 to enable NRIs to vote. Despite the report submitted by the Parliamentary Standing Committee two years ago, the Government has so far failed to act on the recommendations. The Bill was reintroduced in the 2008 budget session of the Parliament to the Lok Sabha. But no action taken once again.

Several civic society organizations have urged the government to amend the RPA act to allow NRI's and people on the move to cast their vote through absentee ballot system.

== See also ==
- List of constituencies of the Bihar Legislative Assembly
- List of Lok Sabha Constituencies in Bihar
- Elections in India
- 49-O Popularly known as 'No Vote'
- 2025 Bihar Legislative Assembly election
- [[18th Bihar Assembly]]
