= Patna cum Shahabad Lok Sabha constituency =

Patna cum Shahabad
- Former Lok Sabha constituency

Constituency details
- Country: India
- Region: East India
- State: Bihar
- District: Patna & Shahabad
- Established: 1951
- Abolished: 1957
- Total electors: 2,87,272
- Reservation: None

Patna cum Shahabad Lok Sabha constituency was a parliamentary constituency in Bihar represented in the 1st Lok Sabha. It was created under the Delimitation of Parliamentary and Assembly Constituencies order, 1951 for the 1951–52 Indian general election and abolished following the delimitation carried out during 1952–53 on the basis of the 1951 Census, prior to the 1957 Indian general election.

== Formation and extent ==
Patna cum Shahabad was a parliamentary constituency comprising parts of the then Patna and Shahabad districts during the 1951–52 Indian general election, the first general election held in independent India. It was one of four parliamentary constituencies representing Patna district, alongside Pataliputra, Patna Central, and Patna East and one of three representing Shahabad district, the others being Shahabad North and Shahabad South.

Under the Delimitation of Parliamentary and Assembly Constituencies Order, 1951, the constituency comprised the Bikram, Bihta, and Paliganj police stations of Dinapur subdivision in Patna district, together with the Barhara, Arrah Muffasil, Sahar, Sandesh, Arrah Town, and Arrah Nawada police stations of Shahabad Sadar subdivision in Shahabad district.

The constituency's boundaries were based on the administrative divisions then in force, when the present-day Bhojpur district formed part of former Shahabad district.

== Election ==
=== General election, 1951–52 ===
Patna cum Shahabad was a single-member constituency. Bali Ram Bhagat of the Indian National Congress was elected to represent it in the 1st Lok Sabha in the 1951–52 general election.

1951–52 Indian general election in Bihar: 04 Patna cum Shahabad
Party	Candidate	Votes	%	±%
INC	Bali Ram Bhagat	62,238	46.90	
Socialist	Devendra Prasad Singh	23,688	17.31	
Ram Rajya Parishad	Gopal Dutta Shastri	20,655	15.09	
Independent	Ishwar Daal Singh	15,071	11.01	
Independent	Birendradhari Sinha	8,009	5.85	
Turnout		136,851	47.64	New

== Abolition ==
Following the delimitation exercise undertaken during 1952–53 on the basis of the 1951 Census, Patna cum Shahabad Lok Sabha constituency was abolished before the 1957 Indian general election. Its territory was incorporated almost entirely into the newly constituted Shahabad parliamentary constituency. The Bikram, Bihta and Paliganj police station areas of Patna district remained within the successor constituency alongside most of its former Shahabad district area. Shahabad retained the overwhelming majority of Patna cum Shahabad's former territory until its abolition. Following the 2008 delimitation, the Patna district portion of the constituency became part of the present-day Pataliputra Lok Sabha constituency, while the remainder of its territory, together with adjoining areas, formed part of the present-day Arrah Lok Sabha constituency.

== See also ==
- 1951–52 Indian general election in Bihar
- 1st Lok Sabha
