= Shahabad, Bihar Lok Sabha constituency =

Former constituency in Bihar, India

Coordinates: 25.6°N 84.7°E

Shahabad
- Former Lok Sabha constituency

Constituency details
- Country: India
- Region: East India
- State: Bihar
- Assembly constituencies: Bikram; Paliganj; Sandesh; Arrah; Arrah Muffasil; Sahar
- Established: 1952 (Patna-cum-Shahabad); 1957 (Shahabad)
- Abolished: 1977
- Reservation: None

Shahabad (formerly Patna-cum-Shahabad) was one of the Lok Sabha (parliamentary) constituencies in Bihar, India. It was a part of Shahabad district (Bhojpur) and Patna district and was in existence during 2nd to 5th Lok Sabha. In 1977, Shahabad Lok Sabha was renamed as Arrah Lok Sabha constituency.

== Assembly segments ==
=== 1951-1961 ===
From 1951 to 1961, the Patna-cum-Shahabad Lok Sabha constituency (renamed as Shahabad in 1957) comprised the following areas: Bikram, Bihta and Paliganj police stations of Danapur sub-division in Patna District; Barhara, Arrah Muffasil, Sahar, Sandesh, Arrah Town and Arrah Nawada police stations of Shahabad Sadar (Arrah) sub-division of Shahabad district.

=== 1961-1976 ===
From 1961 to 1976, the Shahabad Lok Sabha constituency (renamed as Arrah in 1976) had 6 Bihar Legislative Assembly seats. Bikram and Paliganj from Patna district and Sandesh, Arrah, Arrah Muffasil and Sahar from Bhojpur district.

== Members of Parliament ==
=== 1952-1957 ===
As Patna-cum-Shahabad Lok Sabha constituency. This constituency was in existence in only the 1st Lok Sabha from 1952 to 1957.

Year	Name	Party
1952	Bali Ram Bhagat	Indian National Congress

=== 1957-1977 ===
As Shahabad Lok Sabha constituency. This constituency was in existence from 2nd to 5th Lok Sabha (1957-1977).

Year	Name	Party
1957	Bali Ram Bhagat	Indian National Congress
1962	Bali Ram Bhagat	Indian National Congress
1967	Bali Ram Bhagat	Indian National Congress
1971	Bali Ram Bhagat	Indian National Congress

=== 1977-Present ===
See Arrah Lok Sabha constituency for members of 6th Lok Sabha onwards.

== See also ==
- Bhojpur district
- List of constituencies of the Lok Sabha
- Arrah Junction Railway station
