= Patna East Lok Sabha constituency =

Patna East
- Former Lok Sabha constituency

Constituency details
- Country: India
- Region: East India
- State: Bihar
- District: Patna
- Established: 1951
- Abolished: 1957
- Total electors: 2,50,896
- Reservation: None

Patna East Lok Sabha constituency was a parliamentary constituency in Bihar represented in the 1st Lok Sabha. It was created under the Delimitation of Parliamentary and Assembly Constituencies order, 1951 for the 1951–52 Indian general election and abolished following the delimitation carried out during 1952–53 on the basis of the 1951 Census, prior to the 1957 Indian general election.

== Formation and extent ==
Patna East was one of four parliamentary constituencies in the then Patna district during the 1951–52 Indian general election, the first general election held in independent India. The others three constituencies were Pataliputra, Patna Central, and Patna cum Shahabad. The constituency covered the Barh subdivision of the then Patna district together with parts of the Bihar subdivision. Under the Delimitation of Parliamentary and Assembly Constituencies Order, 1951, the constituency comprised:

- Barh subdivision, excluding Fatwah police station; and
- Bihar subdivision, only Bihar and Asthawan police stations.

The constituency's boundaries were based on the administrative divisions then in force, when the present-day Nalanda district formed part of Patna district.

== Election ==
=== General election, 1951–52 ===
Patna East was a single-member constituency. Tarkeshwari Prasad Sinha aka Tarkeshwari Devi of the Indian National Congress was elected to represent it in the 1st Lok Sabha in the 1951–52 general election.

1951–52 Indian general election in Bihar: 03 Patna East
Party	Candidate	Votes	%	±%
INC	Tarkeshwari Devi	62,238	46.90	
Socialist	B. P. Jawahar	29,388	22.14	
MFB	Sheel Bhadra Yajee Alias Laddu Sharma	27,073	20.40	
Independent	Jadunandan Prasad	14,017	10.56	
Turnout		132,716	52.90	New

== Abolition ==
Following the delimitation exercise undertaken during 1952–53 on the basis of the 1951 Census, Patna East Lok Sabha constituency was abolished before the 1957 Indian general election. Its territory was redistributed among the newly constituted Barh, Nalanda and Monghyr parliamentary constituencies. Most of the Barh subdivision became part of Barh, except Sarmera police station, which was included in Monghyr. The Bihar police station area was transferred to Nalanda, while Asthawan police station was included in Monghyr. Although no direct successor constituency was designated, Barh was generally regarded as the principal successor to Patna East, having incorporated the largest share of its former territory until its own dissolution in 2008, when its territory was divided principally between the present-day Munger and Patna Sahib parliamentary constituencies.

== See also ==
- 1951–52 Indian general election in Bihar
- 1st Lok Sabha
