= Pataliputra Lok Sabha constituency (1951-1957) =

Pataliputra
- Former Lok Sabha constituency

Constituency details
- Country: India
- Region: East India
- State: Bihar
- District: Patna
- Established: 1951
- Abolished: 1957
- Total electors: 2,88,982
- Reservation: None

Pataliputra Lok Sabha constituency was a parliamentary constituency in Bihar represented in the 1st Lok Sabha. It was created under the Delimitation of Parliamentary and Assembly Constituencies order, 1951 for the 1951–52 Indian general election and abolished following the delimitation carried out during 1952–53 on the basis of the 1951 Census, prior to the 1957 Indian general election. The constituency derived its name from Pataliputra, the ancient city that occupied much of present-day Patna.

== Formation and extent ==
Pataliputra was one of four parliamentary constituencies in the then Patna district during the 1951–52 Indian general election, the first general election held in independent India. The others three constituencies were Patna Central, Patna East, and Patna cum Shahabad. It covered most of the urban area of Patna together with adjoining suburban and rural areas.

Under the Delimitation of Parliamentary and Assembly Constituencies Order, 1951, the constituency comprised:

- Patna City subdivision;
- Patna Sadar subdivision, excluding Masaurhi and Punpun police stations;
- Dinapur subdivision, excluding Bikram, Bihta and Paliganj police stations; and
- Fatwah police station of Barh subdivision.

The constituency covered much of present-day Patna (urban) together with adjoining suburban and rural areas as defined by the administrative boundaries then in force. The constituency was unrelated to the present-day Pataliputra Lok Sabha constituency, which was created following the 2008 delimitation. Unlike the present-day constituency, which primarily covers the predominantly rural western and southern parts of Patna district, the 1951 constituency was centred on Patna City, the historic urban core of Patna, and Bankipore, then the administrative centre of Bihar.

== Election ==
=== General election, 1951–52 ===
Pataliputra was a single-member constituency. Sarangdhar Sinha (aka Sarangdhar Singh) of the Indian National Congress was elected to represent it in the 1st Lok Sabha in the 1951–52 general election.

1951–52 Indian general election in Bihar: 01 Pataliputra
Party	Candidate	Votes	%	±%
INC	Sarangdhar Singh	64,992	48.63	
Socialist	Gyan Chand	38,294	28.65	
Independent	Navadip Chandra Ghosh	23,650	17.70	
KMPP	Prafulla Ranjan Das	6,709	5.02	
Turnout		133,645	46.25	New

== Abolition ==
Following the delimitation exercise undertaken during 1952–53 on the basis of the 1951 Census, Pataliputra Lok Sabha constituency was abolished before the 1957 Indian general election. Its territory was redistributed principally among the newly constituted Patna and Barh parliamentary constituencies. Patna City, Patna Sadar subdivision (excluding Masaurhi and Punpun) and most of Dinapur subdivision were included in Patna, while Fatwah police station became part of Barh. Although no direct successor constituency was designated, Patna Lok Sabha constituency was generally regarded as the principal successor to Pataliputra, having incorporated most of its former territory until its own dissolution in 2008, when much of the urban area was included in the newly created Patna Sahib Lok Sabha constituency.

== See also ==
- 1951–52 Indian general election in Bihar
- 1st Lok Sabha
- Patna Central Lok Sabha constituency
