= Shiv Narayan Fotedar =

Indian politician

Member of parliament, Lok Sabha
- In office 1952–1957

Personal details
- Occupation: Politician

Shiv Narayan Fotedar (1904 – 6 December 1976) was a Member of Parliament of the 1st Lok Sabha of India.
