= 1st Lok Sabha =

Lower house Members elected in 1951-52

←	Constituent Assembly of India	2nd	→
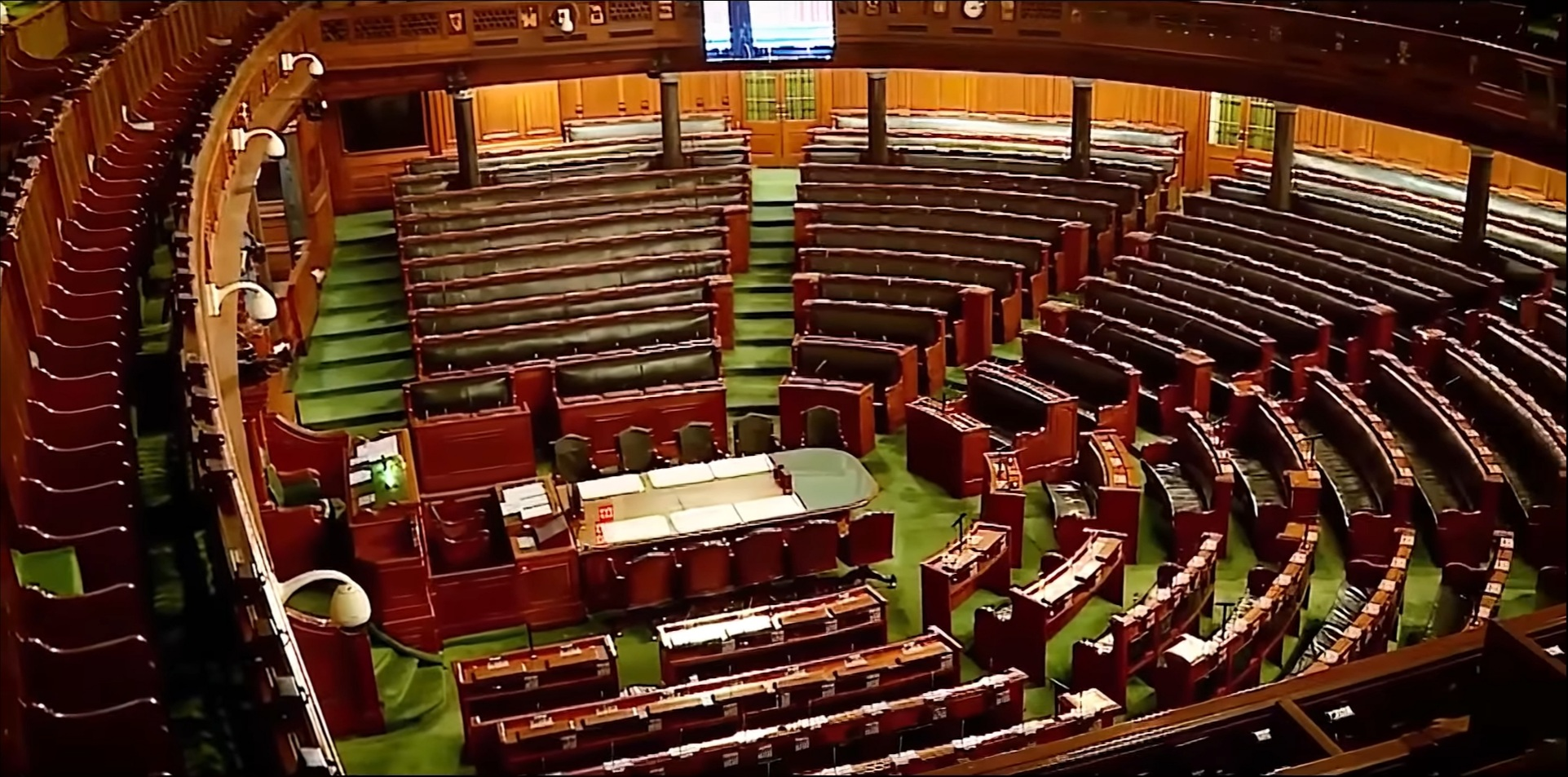
- View of Lok Sabha chamber in the Old Parliament House, New Delhi

Overview
- Legislative body: Indian Parliament
- Term: 17 April 1952 – 4 April 1957
- Election: 1951–52 Indian general election
- Government: Second Nehru Government

Sovereign
- President: Rajendra Prasad
- Vice President: Sarvepalli Radhakrishnan

House of the People
- Members: 499
- Speaker of the House: Ganesh Vasudev Mavalankar; M. A. Ayyangar
- Leader of the House: Jawaharlal Nehru
- Party control: Indian National Congress

The First Lok Sabha was constituted on 17 April 1952 after India's first general election. The 1st Lok Sabha lasted its full tenure of five years and was dissolved on 4 April 1957. The First Session of this Lok Sabha commenced on 13 May 1952.

Total Lok Sabha seats were 499 and total eligible voters were 17.3 crores. The Indian National Congress (INC) won 364 seats. They were followed by Independents, winning a total of 37 seats. The Communist Party of India (CPI) and the Socialist Party (India) followed with 16 and 12 seats respectively. Indian National Congress got 45% of the total votes in this election and won nearly 75% of the 489 contested seats.

== Lok Sabha officers ==
As per Article 93 of Constitution of India, the Lok Sabha must have elected and non-elected officers. The elected members are Speaker and the Deputy Speaker whereas the non-elected members are the Secretariat staff. Following were the 1st Lok Sabha officers and other important members.

#	Position	Name	From	To	Days in office
01	Speaker	Ganesh Vasudev Mavlankar	8 May 1952	27 Feb 1956	1390
01	Speaker	M.A. Ayyangar	8 Mar 1956	10 May 1957	428
02	Deputy Speaker	M. A. Ayyangar	30 May 1952	20 Mar 1956	1377
02	Deputy Speaker	Sardar Hukam Singh	7 Mar 1956	4 Apr 1957	380
03	Secretary-General	M. N. Kaul	17 Apr 1952	4 Apr 1957	1813
04	Leader of the House	Jawaharlal Nehru	17 Apr 1952	4 Apr 1957	1813
05	Leader of the Opposition ^{note a}	A. K. Gopalan	17 Apr 1952	4 Apr 1957	1813

a. (Not Officially Declared) The position of Leader of the Opposition only got recognition in 1977 post Salary and Allowances of Leaders of Opposition in Parliament Act.

== Members ==
List of members as published by the Election Commission of India and Parliament of India:

Members by political party in 1st Lok Sabha are given below:

Party name	Code	Number of MPs	Leader of Lok Sabha
Indian National Congress	INC	364	Jawaharlal Nehru
Communist Party of India	CPI	16	A K Gopalan
Socialist Party	SP	12	Jayaprakash Narayan
Kisan Mazdoor Praja Party	KMPP	9	Sucheta Kripalani
Peoples Democratic Front	PDF	7	Ravi Narayan Reddy
Ganatantra Parishad	GP	6	Rajendra Narayan Singh Deo
Shiromani Akali Dal	SAD	4	
Tamil Nadu Toilers Party	TNTP	4	N.D.Govindaswamy Kachirayar
Akhil Bharatiya Hindu Mahasabha	ABHM	4	
Commonweal Party	CWP	3	A Krishnaswami
Akhil Bharatiya Ram Rajya Parishad	RRP	3	Chandra Sen
Bharatiya Jana Sangh	BJS	3	Syama Prasad Mukherjee
Revolutionary Socialist Party	RSP	3	Tridib Chaudhuri
Jharkhand Party	JKP	3	Jaipal Singh Munda
Scheduled Caste Federation	SCF	2	Pandurang Nathuji Rajbhoj
Lok Sevak Sangh	LSS	2	Bhajahari Mahato
Peasants and Workers Party of India	PWPI	2	Shankar Shantaram More
Forward Bloc (Marxist)	FB(M)	1	U. Muthuramalinga Thevar
Krishikar Lok Party	KLP	1	Manak Chand
Chota Nagpur Santhal Parganas Janata Party	CNSPJP	1	Ram Narayan Singh
Madras State Muslim League Party	MSMLP	1	B. Pocker
Travancore Tamil Nadu Congress Party	TTNC	1	A. Nesamony
Independents		37	
Nominated Anglo-Indians		2	
Total		489	

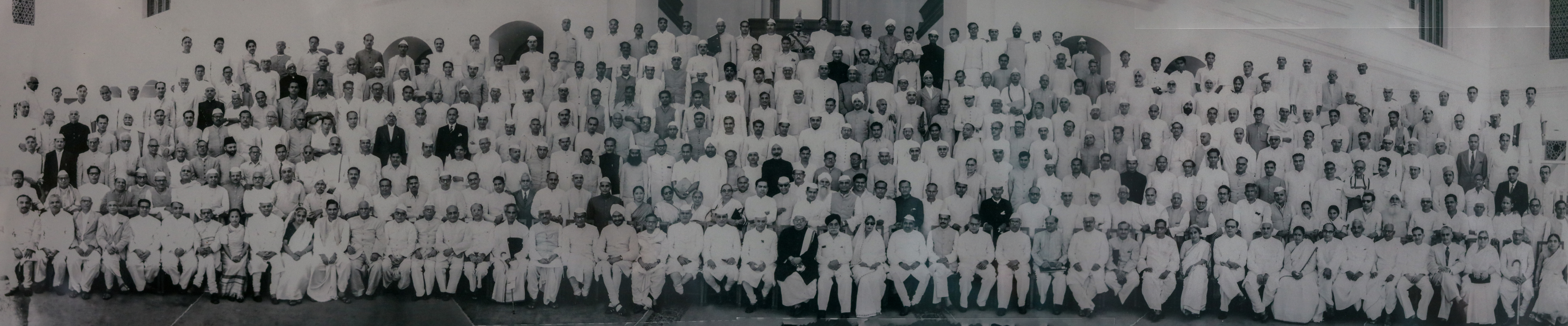
Members of the 1st Lok Sabha, 4th Sep 1956

== Lok Sabha Seats by States and Union Territories ==
=== Assam ===
No.	Constituency	Winner			Runner Up			Margin
1	Cachar Lushal Hills	Suresh Chandra Deb	INC	192847	Satyendra Kishore Ghose	KMPP	84160	108687
1	Cachar Lushal Hills	Nibaran Chandra Laskar	INC	182692	Nitai Chand Patni	KMPP	71704	110988
2	Autonomous Districts	Bonily Khongmen	INC	59326	Wilson Reade	KMPP	32987	26339
3	Goalpara Garo Hills	Amjad Ali	Socialist	182093	Rani Manjula Devi	Independent	158651	23442
3	Goalpara Garo Hills	Sitanath Chowdhury	INC	165144	Satish Chandra Basumatari	Tribal Sangha	116629	48515
4	Barpeta	Beliram Das	INC	76293	Bipin Pal Das	Socialist	63950	12343
5	Gauhati	Rohini Kumar Chaudhury	INC	96122	Lakshya Dhar Chaudhury	Socialist	72553	23569
5	Gauhati	Debendra Nath Sharma (Bypoll 1956)	INC	45057	Hem Barua	PSP	29112	15945
6	Darrang	Kamakhya Prasad Tripathi	INC	81775	Hem Barua	Socialist	47298	34477
7	Nowgong	Deb Kanta Barooah	INC	79673	Goswami Lakshmi Prasad	Socialist	46829	32844
8	Golaghat Jorhat	Debeswar Sarmah	INC	93002	Bhabesh Chandra Barua	Socialist	42327	50675
9	Sibsagar North Lakhimpur	Surendranath Buragohain	INC	90279	Lalit Barbarua	Independent	31616	58663
9	Sibsagar North Lakhimpur	Bimala Prasad Chaliha (Bypoll 1952)	INC	61127	K. N. Barbarua	RCPI	39816	21311
10	Dibrugarh	Jogendra Nath Hazarika	INC	93554	Parasuram Sonowal	Socialist	22844	70710

=== Bihar ===
No.	Constituency	Name of elected M.P.	Party affiliation
1	Pataliputra	Sarangdhar Singh	Indian National Congress
2	Patna Central	Kailash Pati Sinha	Indian National Congress
3	Patna East	Tarkeshwari Devi	Indian National Congress
4	Patna cum Shahabad	Bali Ram Bhagat	Indian National Congress
5	Gaya East	Brajeshwar Prasad	Indian National Congress
6	Gaya East	Ramdhari Das	Indian National Congress
7	Gaya North	Brijeshwar Missir	Socialist Party
8	Gaya West	Satyendra Narayan Sinha	Indian National Congress
9	Shahabad South	Jagjivan Ram	Indian National Congress
10	Shahabad South	Ram Subhag Singh	Indian National Congress
11	Shahabad North West	Kamal Singh	Independent
12	Saran North	Jhulan Sinha	Indian National Congress
13	Saran Central	Mahendra Nath Singh	Indian National Congress
14	Saran East	Satya Narayan Singh	Indian National Congress
15	Saran South	Dwarkanath Tiwari	Indian National Congress
16	Saran cum Champaran	Bibhuti Mishra	Indian National Congress
17	Saran cum Champaran	Bhola Raut	Indian National Congress
18	Champaran North	Bipin Bihari Verma	Indian National Congress
19	Champaran East	Syed Mahmud	Indian National Congress
20	Muzaffarpur North West	Thakur Jugal Kishore Sinha	Indian National Congress
21	Muzaffarpur North East	Digvijay Narain Singh	Indian National Congress
22	Muzaffarpur Central	Shyam Nandan Sahay	Indian National Congress
23	Muzaffarpur East	Awadheshwar Sinha	Indian National Congress
24	Muzaffarpur cum Darbhanga	Rameshwar Sahu	Indian National Congress
25	Muzaffarpur cum Darbhanga	Rajeshwara Patel	Indian National Congress
26	Samastipur East	Satya Narayan Sinha	Indian National Congress
27	Darbhanga Central	Shree Narayan Das	Indian National Congress
28	Darbhanga East	Anirudha Sinha	Indian National Congress
29	Darbhanga North	Shyam Nandan Mishra	Indian National Congress
30	Darbhanga cum Bhagalpur	Lalit Narayan Mishra	Indian National Congress
31	Monghyr Sadar cum Jamui	Banarasi Sinha	Indian National Congress
32	Monghyr Sadar cum Jamui	Nayan Tara Das	Indian National Congress
33	Monghyr North West	Mathura Prasad Mishra	Indian National Congress
34	Monghyr North East	Suresh Chandra Mishra	Socialist Party
35	Bhagalpur cum Purnea	Anup Lal Mehta	Indian National Congress
36	Bhagalpur cum Purnea	Kirai Mushahar	Socialist Party
37	Bhagalpur Central	Banarasi Jhunjhunwala	Indian National Congress
38	Bhagalpur South	Sushama Sen	Indian National Congress
39	Purnea North East	Muhammad Islamuddin	Indian National Congress
40	Purnea Central	Phani Gopal Sen Gupta	Indian National Congress
41	Purnea cum Santal Parganas	Jughar Soren Paul	Jharkhand Party
42	Purnea cum Santal Parganas	Bhagat Jha	Indian National Congress
43	Santal Parganas cum Hazaribag	Lal Hembrom	Indian National Congress
44	Santal Parganas cum Hazaribag	Ram Raj Jajware	Indian National Congress
45	Hazaribag East	Nageshwar Sinha	Indian National Congress
46	Hazaribag West	Ram Narayan Singh	Chota Nagpur Santhal Parganas Janata Party
47	Ranchi North East	Abdul Ibrahim	Indian National Congress
48	Ranchi West	Jaipal Singh	Jharkhand Party
49	Palamau cum Hazaribag cum Ranchi	Gajendra Prasad Sinha	Indian National Congress
50	Palamau cum Hazaribag cum Ranchi	Jithan Kherwar	Indian National Congress
51	Manbhum North	Prabhat Chandra Bose	Indian National Congress
51	Manbhum North	Mohan Hari	Indian National Congress
52	Manbhum South cum Dhalbum	Bhajahari Mahato	Lok Sevak Sangh
52	Manbhum South cum Dhalbum	Chaitan Manjhi	Lok Sevak Sangh
53	Chailbassa	Kanu Ram Deogam	Jharkhand Party

=== Bombay ===
PWPI (1)

Constituency	Reserved	Member	Party
Banaskantha	None	Akbar Dalumiyan Chavda	Indian National Congress
Sabarkantha	None	Gulzarilal Nanda	Indian National Congress
Panchmahal cum Baroda East	None	Maneklal Gandhi	Indian National Congress
Panchmahal cum Baroda East	None	Rupajee Bhavji Parmar	Indian National Congress
Mehsana East	None	Santilal Girdharlal Parekh	Indian National Congress
Mehsana West	None	Tulsidas Kilachand	Independent
Ahmedabad	None	Muldas Bhudardas Vaishya	Indian National Congress
Ahmedabad	None	Ganesh Vasudev Mavalankar	Indian National Congress
Kaira North	None	Fulsinhji Bharatsinhji Dabhi	Indian National Congress
Kaira South	None	Maniben Patel	Indian National Congress
Baroda West	None	Indubhai Bhailalbhai Amin	Independent
Broach	None	Chandrashankar Manishankar Bhatt	Indian National Congress
Surat	None	Kanhaiyalal Nanabhai Desai	Indian National Congress
Surat	None	Bahadurbhai Kuthabhai Patel	Indian National Congress
Thana	None	Anant Savalaram Nandkar	Indian National Congress
Thana	None	Govind Dharamji Vartak	Indian National Congress
Ahmednagar North	None	Pandharinath Ramachandra Kanavade	Indian National Congress
Ahmednagar South	None	Uttamchand Ramchand Bogavat	Indian National Congress
Bhusawal	None	Shivaram Rango Rane	Indian National Congress
Jalgaon	None	Hari Vinayak Pataskar	Indian National Congress
West Khandesh	None	Shaligram Ramachandra Bharatiya	Indian National Congress
West Khandesh	None	Jayantrao Ganpat Natwadkar	Indian National Congress
Nasik Central	None	G H Deshpande	Indian National Congress
Poona Central	None	Narhar Vishnu Gadgil	Indian National Congress
Poona South	None	Indira Anant Maydeo	Indian National Congress
North Satara	None	Ganesh Sadashiv Altekar	Indian National Congress
Kolhapur cum Satara	None	Balasaheb Hasanmantrao Khardekar	Independent
Kolhapur cum Satara	None	Ratnappa Kumbhar	Indian National Congress
Sholapur	None	Shankar Shantaram More	Peasants and Workers Party of India
Sholapur	None	Pandurang Nathuji Rajbhoj	SCF
Kolaba	None	C. D. Deshmukh	Indian National Congress
South Satara	None	Vyankatrao Pirajirao Pawar	Indian National Congress
Belgaum North	None	B. N. Datar	Indian National Congress
Belgaum South	None	Shankargowda Virangowda Patil	Indian National Congress
Ratnagiri North	None	Jagganathrao Krishnarao Bhosale	Indian National Congress
Ratnagiri South	None	Moreshwar Dinkar Joshi	Indian National Congress
Bijapur North	None	Rajaram Girdharlal Dube	Indian National Congress
Bijapur South	None	Ramappa Ballapa Bidari	Indian National Congress
Dharwar North	None	D. P. Karmarkar	Indian National Congress
Dharwar South	None	Timmappa Rudrappa Neswi	Indian National Congress
Kanara	None	Joachim Alva	Indian National Congress
Bombay City South	None	S. K. Patil	Indian National Congress
Bombay City North	None	Vithal Gandhi	Indian National Congress
Bombay City North	None	Narayan Sadoba Kajrolkar	Indian National Congress
Bombay Suburban	None	Jaishri Naishadh Raoji	Indian National Congress

=== Madhya Pradesh ===
Constituency	Reserved	Member	Party
Buldana Akola	None	Gopalrao Bajirao Khedkar	Indian National Congress
Buldana Akola	None	Laxman Shrawan Bhatkar	Indian National Congress
Yavatmal	None	Sahadeo Arjun Bharati	Indian National Congress
Amravati East	None	Panjabrao Deshmukh	Indian National Congress
Amravati West	None	Krisnarao Gulabrao Deshmukh	Indian National Congress
Chanda	None	Mulla Abdullabhai Taherali	Indian National Congress
Bhandara	None	Tularam Chandrabhan Sakhare	Indian National Congress
Bhandara	None	Chaturbhuj Vitthaldas Jasani	Indian National Congress
Nagpur	None	Anasuyabai Kale	Indian National Congress
Wardha	None	Shrimannarayan Dharamnarayan Aggarwal	Indian National Congress
Betul	None	Bhikulal Lakshmichand Chandak	Indian National Congress
Chinddwara	None	Raichandbhai Shah	Indian National Congress
Hoshangabad	None	Syed Ahmad	Indian National Congress
Nimar	None	Tiwari Babulal Surajbhan	Indian National Congress
Sagar	None	Sodhi Khubchand Daryao Singh	Indian National Congress
Jabalpur North	None	Sushil Kumar	Indian National Congress
Mandla Jabalpur South	None	Mangroo	Indian National Congress
Mandla Jabalpur South	None	Govind Das Maheshwari	Indian National Congress
Balaghat	None	C D Gautam	Indian National Congress
Durg Bastar	None	Bhagwati Charan Shukla	Indian National Congress
Durg	None	W. S. Kirolikar	Indian National Congress
Mahasamund	None	Shivdas Daga	Indian National Congress
Bilaspur Durg Raipur	None	Bhupendranath Mishra	Indian National Congress
Bilaspur Durg Raipur	None	Agamdas	Indian National Congress
Bilaspur	None	Reshamlal	Indian National Congress
Bilaspur	None	Sardar Amarsingh Saigal	Indian National Congress
Surguja Raigarh	None	Babu Nath Singh	Indian National Congress
Surguja Raigarh	None	Chandikeshwar Sharan Singh	Independent
Bastar	None	Muchaki Kosa	Independent

=== Madras State ===
Constituency	Reserved	Member	Party
Pathapatnam	None	V. V. Giri	Indian National Congress
Srikakulam	None	Boddepalli Rajagopala Rao	Independent
Parvathipuram	None	N Rama Seshiah	Independent
Vizianagaram	None	Kandala Subramaniam	Socialist Party
Vishakhapatnam	None	Lanka Sundaram	Independent
Vishakhapatnam	None	Gam Malludora	Independent
Kakinada	None	Chelikani Venkat Rama Rao	Communist Party of India
Rajahmundry	None	Kaneti Mohana Rao	Communist Party of India
Rajahmundry	None	Nalla Reddi Naidu	Socialist Party
Eluru	None	Kondru Subba Rao	Communist Party of India
Eluru	None	B S Murty	Kisan Mazdoor Praja Party
Masulipatnam	None	Sanka Butehikottaiah	Communist Party of India
Gudivada	None	K Gopala Rao	Communist Party of India
Vijayavada	None	Harindranath Chatopadhyaya	Independent
Tenali	None	Kotha Raghuramiah	Indian National Congress
Guntur	None	S V Laxmi Narsimhan	Independent
Narasaraopet	None	Chapalamadugu Ramiah Chowdhary	Independent
Ongole	None	M Nanadass	Independent
Ongole	None	P Venkataraghaviah	Independent
Nellore	None	Bezwada Ramchandra Reddy	Independent
Nandyal	None	Seshgiri Rao	Independent
Kurnool	None	H Sitaram Reddy	Indian National Congress
Bellary	None	T. Subramanyam	Indian National Congress
Anantapur	None	Paidi Lakshmayya	Indian National Congress
Penukonda	None	K S Raghavachari	Kisan Mazdoor Praja Party
Cuddapah	None	Eswara Reddy Yellura	Communist Party of India
Chittoor	None	T N Vishwanatha Reddi	Indian National Congress
Chittoor	None	M V Gangadhara Siva	Indian National Congress
Tirupati	None	M. Ananthasayanam Ayyanagar	Indian National Congress
Madras	None	T.T Krishnamachari	Indian National Congress
Tiruvallur	None	Maragatham Chandrasekhar	Indian National Congress
Tiruvallur	None	P Nathesan	Indian National Congress
Chingleput	None	O V Alagesan	Indian National Congress
Kanchipuram	None	A Krishnaswami	Commonweal League
Vellore	None	Ramachandra	Commonweal League
Vellore	None	Muthukrisnan	Indian National Congress
Wandiwah	None	Munisami	Commonweal League
Krishnagiri	None	C R Narasimhan	Indian National Congress
Dharampuri	None	M Satyanathan	Independent
Salem	None	S V Ramaswamy	Indian National Congress
Erode	None	Periasami Gounder	Indian National Congress
Erode	None	Balakrishnan	Indian National Congress
Tiruchengode	None	S K Baby/Kandaswami	Independent
Tiruppur	None	T S Avinashilingam Chettiar	Indian National Congress
Pollachi	None	Damodaran	Indian National Congress
Coimbatore	None	T A Ramalinga Chettiar	Indian National Congress
Pudukkottai	None	K M Vallatharsu	Kisan Mazdoor Praja Party
Perambalur	None	V. Boorarangaswami Pendyachhi	Tamil Nadu Toiler's Party
Tiruchirapalli	None	E Mathuran	Independent
Tanjore	None	R. Venkataraman	Indian National Congress
Kumbakonam	None	C Ramaswamy Mudaliar	Indian National Congress
Mayuram	None	K Ananda Nambiar	Communist Party of India
Mayuram	None	V Veeraswamy	Independent
Cuddalore	None	L Elayaperumal	Indian National Congress
Cuddalore	None	N.D.Govindaswamy Kachirayar	Tamil Nadu Toilers' Party
Tindivanam	None	A Jayaraman	Tamil Nadu Toilers' Party
Tindivanam	None	V Muniswami	Tamil Nadu Toilers' Party
Tirunelvali	None	Thanu Pillai	Indian National Congress
Srivaikuntam	None	A V Thomas	Indian National Congress
Sankaranainarkoil	None	M Sankarapandian	Indian National Congress
Aruppukottai	None	U. Muthuramalinga Thevar	FBL(MG)
Ramananthapuram	None	V Nagappa Chettiar	Indian National Congress
Srivilliputtur	None	K Kamraj Nadar	Indian National Congress
Madurai	None	P M Kakkan	Indian National Congress
Madurai	None	S Balasubramaniam	Indian National Congress
Periyakulam	None	Saktivadivel Gounder	Indian National Congress
Dindigul	None	Ammu Swaminathan	Indian National Congress
South Kanara (North)	None	U Srinivas Mallyya	Indian National Congress
South Kanara (South)	None	B. Shiva Roy	Indian National Congress
Cannanore	None	A K Gopalan	Communist Party of India
Tellicherry	None	N Damodaran	Kisan Mazdoor Praja Party
Kozhikode	None	Achuthan Damodaran Menon	Kisan Mazdoor Praja Party
Malappuram	None	B. Pocker	Muslim League
Ponnani	None	Kellapan Koyhapali	Kisan Mazdoor Praja Party
Ponnani	None	Vella Eacharan Iyyani	Indian National Congress

=== Orissa ===
Constituency	Reserved	Member	Party
Nowrangpur	None	Ponnada Subarao	GP
Raigarh Phulbani	Scheduled Tribes	T. Sangana	Indian National Congress
Kalahandi Bolangir	None	Giridhari Bhoi	GP
Kalahandi Bolangir	None	Rajendra Narayan Singh Deo	GP
Bargarh	None	Brajmohan Pradhan	GP
Sambalpur	None	Natabar Pandey	GP
Sundargarh	Scheduled Tribes	Sibnarayan Singh	Indian National Congress
Dhenkanal West Cuttack	None	Niranjan Jena	Indian National Congress
Dhenkanal West Cuttack	None	Sarangadhar Das	SP
Jajpur Keonjhar	None	Bhubanand Das	Indian National Congress
Jajpur Keonjhar	None	Laxmidhar Jena	GP
Mayurbhanj	Scheduled Tribes	Ramchandra Majhi	Indian National Congress
Balasore	None	Kanhu Charan Jena	Indian National Congress
Balasore	None	Bhagabat Sahu	Indian National Congress
Kendrapara	None	Nityanand Kanungo	Indian National Congress
Cuttack	None	Harekrushna Mahtab	Indian National Congress
Puri	None	Loknath Mishra	Indian National Congress
Khurda	None	Lingraj Mishra	Indian National Congress
Ghumsur	None	Umachand Patnaik	Independent
Ganjam South	None	Bijoy Chandra Das	Communist Party of India

=== Punjab ===
Constituency	Reserved	Member	Party
Ambala Simla	None	Tek Chand	Indian National Congress
Karnal	None	Virendra Kumar	Indian National Congress
Karnal	None	Subhadra Joshi	Indian National Congress
Rohtak	None	Ranbir Singh Hooda	Indian National Congress
Jhajjar Rewari	None	Ghamandi Lal	Indian National Congress
Gurgaon	None	Thakkar Das	Indian National Congress
Hissar	None	Achint Lal	Indian National Congress
Fazila Sirsa	None	Atma Singh	Indian National Congress
Nawan Shar	None	Baldev Singh	Indian National Congress
Kangra	None	Hem Raj	Indian National Congress
Jullundur	None	Amar Nath	Indian National Congress
Gurdaspur	None	Teja Singh	Indian National Congress
Tarn Taran	None	Surjit Singh	Indian National Congress
Amritsar	None	Gurmit Singh Musaffar	Indian National Congress
Hoshiarpur	None	Ram Das	Indian National Congress
Hoshiarpur	None	Diwan Chand	Indian National Congress
Ferozepore Ludhiana	None	Bahadur Singh	Shiromani Akali Dal
Ferozepore Ludhiana	None	Lal Singh	Shiromani Akali Dal

=== Uttar Pradesh ===
Constituency	Name	Reserved	Party
Amroha (Lok Sabha constituency)	Maulana Hifzur Rahman Seoharwi		Indian National Congress
Dehra Dun District cum Bijnor District (North West); Cum Saharanpur District (West)	Mahavir Tyagi	—	Indian National Congress
Garhwal District (West) cum Tehri Garhwal District cum Bijnor District (North)	Kamlendumati Shah	—	Independent
Garhwal District (East) cum Moradabad District (North East)	Bhakt Darshan	—	Indian National Congress
Almora District (North East)	Devi Datt	—	Indian National Congress
Naini Tal District cum Almora District (South West) cum Bareilly District (North)	C. D. Pande	—	Indian National Congress
Bareilly District (South)	Satish Chandra	—	Indian National Congress
Pilibhit District cum Bareilly District (East)	Mukund Lal Agarwal	—	Indian National Congress
Moradabad District (West)	Ram Saran	—	Indian National Congress
Moradabad District (Central)	Hifzul Rehman	—	Indian National Congress
Rampur District cum Bareilly District (West)	Abul Kalam Azad	—	Indian National Congress
Bijnor District (South)	Nemi Saran	—	Indian National Congress
Saharanpur District (West) cum Muzaffarnagar District (North)	Sunder Lal	—	Indian National Congress
Saharanpur District (West) cum Muzaffarnagar District (North)	Ajit Prashad / Ajit Prasad Jain	—	Indian National Congress
Muzaffarnagar District (South)	Tripathi Hira Ballabh	—	Indian National Congress
Meerut District (West)	Khushi Ram Sharma	—	Indian National Congress
Meerut District (South)	Krishna Chandra Sharma	—	Indian National Congress
Meerut District (North East)	Shah Nawaz Khan	—	Indian National Congress
Bulandshahr District	Raghubar Dayal	—	Indian National Congress
Bulandshahr District	Balmiki Kanhaiya Lal	—	Indian National Congress
Aligarh District	Nardeo Ji	—	Indian National Congress
Aligarh District	Shri Chand Singhal	—	Indian National Congress
Agra District (West)	Achal Singh Seth	—	Indian National Congress
Agra District (East)	Raghubir Singh	—	Indian National Congress
Mathura District (West)	Krishna Chandra	—	Indian National Congress
Etah District (West) cum Mainpuri District (West) cum Mathura District (East)	Digamber Singh	—	Indian National Congress
Etah District (Central)	Rohan Lal Chaturvedi	—	Indian National Congress
Etah District North East cum Baduan District (East)	Raghubir Sahai	—	Indian National Congress
Badaun District (West)	Badan Sing	—	Indian National Congress
Farrukhabad District (North)	Mool Chand Dube	—	Indian National Congress
Mainpuri District (East)	Badshah Gupta	—	Indian National Congress
Jalaun District cum Etawah District (West) cum Jhansi District (North)	Lotan Ram	—	Indian National Congress
Jalaun District cum Etawah District (West) cum Jhansi District (North)	Hoti Lal	—	Indian National Congress
Kanpur District North cum Farrukhabad District South	V. N. Tiwari	—	Indian National Congress
Kanpur District Central	Hari Har Nath Shastri	—	Indian National Congress
Kanpur District South cum Etawah District	Bal Krishna Sharma	—	Indian National Congress
Jhansi District (South)	Dhulekar Raghunath	—	Indian National Congress
Hamirpur District	Mannu Lal Duvedi	—	Indian National Congress
Banda District cum Fatehpur District	Pyare Lal Kureel	—	Indian National Congress
Banda District cum Fatehpur District	Shive Dayal	—	Indian National Congress
Unnao District cum Rae Bareli District (West) cum Hardoi District (South East)	Vishambhar Dayal	—	Indian National Congress
Unnao District cum Rae Bareli District (West) cum Hardoi District (South East)	Swami Ramanand	—	Indian National Congress
Hardoi District (North West) cum Farukkhabad District (East) cum Shahjahanpur District (South)	Bulaqi Ram	—	Indian National Congress
Hardoi District (North West) cum Farukkhabad District (East) cum Shahjahanpur District (South)	Bashir Husain Zaidi	—	Indian National Congress
Shajahanpur District (North) cum Kheri District (East)	Rameshwar Prasad Nevatia	—	Indian National Congress
Shajahanpur District (North) cum Kheri District (East)	Ganeshi Lal Chowdhary	—	Indian National Congress
Sitapur District cum Kheri District (West)	Uma Nehru	—	Indian National Congress
Sitapur District cum Kheri District (West)	Pragi Lal	—	Indian National Congress
Lucknow District cum Bara Banki District	Mohan Lal Saxena	—	Indian National Congress
Lucknow District cum Bara Banki District	Ganga Devi	—	Indian National Congress
Lucknow District Central	Vijai Laxmi Pandit	—	Indian National Congress
Pratapgarh District (West) cum Rae Bareli District (East)	Baij Nath Kureel	—	Indian National Congress
Pratapgarh District (West) cum Rae Bareli District (East)	Feroze Gandhi	—	Indian National Congress
Pratapgarh District (East)	Munishwer Dutt Upadhyaya	—	Indian National Congress
Sultanpur District (South)	B. V. Keskar	—	Indian National Congress
Sultanpur District (North) cum Faizabad District (South West)	Syed Mohammad Ahmad Kazmi	—	Indian National Congress
Faizabad District (North West)	Panna Lal	—	Indian National Congress
Faizabad District (North West)	Lallan Ji	—	Indian National Congress
Jaunpur District (East)	Ganpat	—	Indian National Congress
Jaunpur District (East)	Birbal Singh	—	Indian National Congress
Allahabad District (East) cum Jaunpur District (West)	Masuriya Din	—	Indian National Congress
Allahabad District (East) cum Jaunpur District (West)	Jawahar Lal Nehru	—	Indian National Congress
Allahabad District (West)	Shri Prakasha	—	Indian National Congress
Mirzapur District cum Banaras District (West)	Rup Narain	—	Indian National Congress
Mirzapur District cum Banaras District (West)	J. N. Wilson	—	Indian National Congress
Banaras District (Central)	Raghunath Singh	—	Indian National Congress
Banaras District (East)	Tribhaun Narain Singh	—	Indian National Congress
Bahraich District (East)	Rafi Ahmed Kidwai	—	Indian National Congress
Bahraich District (West)	Jogendra Singh	—	Indian National Congress
Gonda District (North)	Chowdhari Hyder Husain	—	Indian National Congress
Gonda District (West)	Shakuntala Nayar	—	HMS
Gonda District (East) cum Basti District (West)	Kesho Deo Malviya	—	Indian National Congress
Basti District (North)	Udai Shankar Dubey	—	Indian National Congress
Basti District Central (East) cum Gorakhpur District (West)	Sohan Lal Dhusiya	—	Indian National Congress
Basti District Central (East) cum Gorakhpur District (West)	Ram Shanker Lal	—	Indian National Congress
Gorakhpur District (North)	Hari Shanker Prasad	—	Indian National Congress
Gorakhpur District (Central)	Dashrath Prasad Divedi	—	Indian National Congress
Gorakhpur District (South)	Sinhasan Singh	—	Indian National Congress
Deoria District (South)	Sarayu	—	Indian National Congress
Deoria District (West)	Bishwa Nath	—	Indian National Congress
Deoria District (East)	Ram Ji	—	SP
Azamgarh District (West)	Sita Ram	—	Indian National Congress
Azamgarh District (West)	Vishwa Nath	—	Indian National Congress
Azamgarh District (East) cum Ballia District (West)	Algu Rai Shastri	—	Indian National Congress
Ghazipur District (West)	Har Prasad	—	Indian National Congress
Ghazipur District (East) cum Ballia District South (West)	Ram Nagina	—	SP
Ballia District (East)	Murli Manohar	—	Independent

=== West Bengal ===
Constituency	Reserved	Member	Party
West Dinajpur	None	Sushil Ranjan Chatopadhyay	Indian National Congress
Malda	None	Surendra Mohan Ghosh	Indian National Congress
Birbhum	None	Kamal Krisna Das	Indian National Congress
Birbhum	None	Anil Kumar Chanda	Indian National Congress
Murshidabad	None	Muhammad Khuda Baksh	Indian National Congress
Berhampore	None	Tridib Chaudhari	Revolutionary Socialist Party (India)
Bankura	None	Pashupati Mandal	Indian National Congress
Bankura	None	Jaggannath Koley	Indian National Congress
Midnapur Jhargam	None	Tudu Bharat Lal	Indian National Congress
Midnapur Jhargam	None	Bandhopadhyaya Durga Charan	Bharatiya Jana Sangh
Ghatal	None	Chowdhary Nikunj Bihari	Communist Party of India
Tamluk	None	Satish Chandra Samanta	Indian National Congress
Contai	None	Basant Kumar Das	Indian National Congress
Uluberia	None	Satyaban Rai	Indian National Congress
Howrah	None	Santosh Kumar Dutta	Indian National Congress
Sreerampur	None	Tushar Kanti Chattopadhyaya	Communist Party of India
Hooghly	None	NC Chatterjee	Akhil Bharatiya Hindu Mahasabha
Burdwan	None	Mono Mohan Das	Indian National Congress
Burdwan	None	Atulya Ghosh	Indian National Congress
Kalna Katwa	None	Janab Abdus Sattar	Indian National Congress
Nabadwip	None	Lakshmikant Maitra	Indian National Congress
Santipur	None	Arun Chandra Guha	Indian National Congress
Basirhat	None	Chakravarty Renu	Communist Party of India
Basirhat	None	Roy Patirman	Indian National Congress
Barrackpur	None	Das Ramananda	Indian National Congress
Diamond Harbour	None	Basu Kamal	Communist Party of India
Diamond Harbour	None	Naskar Purnendu Sekhar	Indian National Congress
Calcutta South West	None	Asim Krishna Dutt	Indian National Congress
Calcutta South East	None	Shyama Prasad Mookerjee	Bharatiya Jana Sangh
Calcutta North East	None	Hirendranath Mukherjee	Communist Party of India
Calcutta North West	None	Meghnad Saha	Revolutionary Socialist Party (India)

=== Hyderabad State ===
PWPI (1)

Constituency	Reserved	Member	Party
Hyderabad City	None	Ahmed Mohiuddin	Indian National Congress
IbrahimPatam	None	Sadath Ali Khan	Indian National Congress
Mahboobnagar	None	Janardhan Reddy	Indian National Congress
Mahboobnagar	None	P Ramaswamy	Indian National Congress
Kusatgi	None	Shiv Murthy Swami	Independent
Gulbarga	None	Swami Ramanand Tirtha	Indian National Congress
Yadgir	None	Krishnacharya Joshi	Indian National Congress
Bidar	None	Shaukatullah Shah Ansari	Indian National Congress
Vikarabad	None	Ebenezeer S. A.	Indian National Congress
Osmanabad	None	Raghvendra Srinivas Rao	Indian National Congress
Bhir	None	Ramchander Govind Paranjpe	People's Democratic Front
Aurangabad	None	Sureshchandra Shivprasad Arya	Indian National Congress
Ambad	None	Hanumanthrao Ganeshrao Vaishnav	Indian National Congress
Parbhani	None	Narayanrao Waghmare	Peasants and Workers Party
Nanded	None	Deo Ram Namdev Rao	Indian National Congress
Nanded	None	Shanmer Rao Srinivas Rao	Indian National Congress
Adilabad	None	C. Madhav Reddy	Socialist Party
Nizamabad	None	Harish Chandra Heda	Indian National Congress
Medak	None	Jayasoorya	People's Democratic Front
Karimnagar	None	M. R. Krishnan	All India Scheduled Caste's Federation
Karimnagar	None	Badam Yella Reddy	People's Democratic Front
Warangal	None	Pendyal Raghava Rao	People's Democratic Front
Khammam	None	T. B. Vittala Rao	People's Democratic Front
Nalgonda	None	Ravi Narayan Reddy	People's Democratic Front
Nalgonda	None	Sukam Atchalu	People's Democratic Front

=== Madhya Bharat ===
Constituency	Reserved	Member	Party
Nimar	None	Bajinath Mahodaya	Indian National Congress
Jhabua	Scheduled Tribes	Amar Singh	Indian National Congress
Indore	None	Nandalal Suryanarayan	Indian National Congress
Ujjain	None	Radhelal Vyas	Indian National Congress
Mandsaur	None	Kailash Nath Katju	Indian National Congress
Shajapur Rajgarh	None	Liladhar Joshi	Indian National Congress
Shajapur Rajgarh	None	Bhagu Nanda	Indian National Congress
Morena Bhind	None	Surya Prasad	Indian National Congress
Morena Bhind	None	Radha Charan	Indian National Congress
Guna	None	Vishnu Ghanshyam Deshpande	Hindu Mahasabha
Gwalior	None	Narayan Bhaskar Khare (via poll)	Hindu Mahasabha

=== Mysore State ===
Constituency	Reserved	Member	Party
Kolar	None	M. V. Krishnappa	Indian National Congress
Kolar	None	Dodda Thimmaiah	Indian National Congress
Tumkur	None	C. R. Basappa	Indian National Congress
Bangalore North	None	Keshava Iyengar	Indian National Congress
Bangalore South	None	T. Madiah Gowda	Indian National Congress
Mandya	None	M. K. Shivananjappa	Indian National Congress
Hassan Chikmagalur	None	H. Siddananjappa	Indian National Congress
Shimoga	None	K. G. Wodeyar	Indian National Congress
Chitradurga	None	S. Nijalingappa	Indian National Congress
Mysore	None	N. Rachiah	Indian National Congress
Mysore	None	M. S. Gurupadaswamy	Kisan Mazdoor Praja Party

=== Patiala and East Punjab States Union ===
Constituency	Reserved	Member	Party
Mohindergarh	None	Hira Singh	Indian National Congress
Patiala	None	Ram Pratap	Indian National Congress
Kapurthala Bhatinda	None	Ajit Singh	Shiromani Akali Dal
Kapurthala Bhatinda	None	Hukum Singh	Shiromani Akali Dal
Sangrur	None	Ranjit Singh	Independent

=== Rajasthan ===
Constituency	Reserved	Member	Party
Jaipur Sawaimadhopur	None	Ram Karan Joshi	Indian National Congress
Bharatpur Sawaimadhopur	None	Girraj Sharan Singh	Independent
Bharatpur Sawaimadhopur	None	Manak Chand	KLP
Alwar	None	Shobha Ram Kumawat	Indian National Congress
Ganganagar Jhunjunu	None	Murarka Radhey Shyam	Indian National Congress
Ganganagar Jhunjunu	None	Panna Lal	Indian National Congress
Bikaner Churu	None	Karni Singh	Independent
Jodhpur	None	Hanwant Singh	Independent
Balmer Jalore	None	Bhawani Singh	Independent
Sirohi Pali	None	Ajit Singh	Independent
Nagaur Pali	None	Gajadhar	Independent
Sikar	None	Nand Lal	RRP
Jaipur	None	Daulat Mal	Indian National Congress
Tonk	None	Pannalal Kaushik	Indian National Congress
Bhilwara	None	Hariram	RRP
Udaipur	None	Swatantrata Senani Master Balwant Singh Mehta	Indian National Congress
Banswara Dungarpur	None	Bhika Bhai	Indian National Congress
Chittor	None	Umashankar	BJS
Kotab Bundi	None	Chandra Sen	RRP
Kotah Jhalawar	None	Nemichand Kasilwal	Indian National Congress

=== Saurashtra ===
Constituency	Reserved	Member	Party
Halar	None	M. S. Himmatsinghji	Indian National Congress
Madhya Saurashtra	None	Joshi Jethalal Harikrishna	Indian National Congress
Zalawad	None	Parikh Rasiklal Umedchand	Indian National Congress
Gohilwad	None	Mehta Balwantrai Gopalji	Indian National Congress
Gohilwad Sorath	None	Shah Chamanlal Chakubhai	Indian National Congress
Sorath	None	Nathiwani Narendra	Indian National Congress

=== Travancore Cochin ===
Constituency	Reserved	Member	Party
Nagercoil	None	A. Nesamony	Travancore-Cochin Congress
Trivandrum	None	Annie Mascarene	Independent
Trichur	None	Iyyunni Chalakka	Indian National Congress
Cangannur	None	K.T. Achuthan	Indian National Congress
Ernakulam	None	A.M. Thomas	Indian National Congress
Kottayam	None	Prof. C.P. Mathew	Indian National Congress
Meenachil	None	P. T. Chacko	Indian National Congress
Thiruvalla	None	C. P. Matthen	Indian National Congress
Ambalapuzha	None	P.T. Punnoose	Communist Party of India
Chirayinkil	None	V. Parameswaran Nayar	Independent
Quilon cum Mavelikara	None	R. Velayudhan	Independent
Quilon cum Mavelikara	None	N. Sreekantan Nair	Revolutionary Socialist Party

=== Ajmer State ===
Constituency	Reserved	Member	Party
Ajmer North	None	Jwala Prasad	Indian National Congress
Ajmer South	None	Mukat Behari Lal Bhargava	Indian National Congress

=== Bhopal State ===
Constituency	Reserved	Member	Party
Sehore	None	Saeed Ullah Razmi	Indian National Congress
Raisen	None	Chatrunarayan Malviya	Indian National Congress

=== Bilaspur State ===
Constituency	Reserved	Member	Party
Bilaspur	None	Anand Chand	Independent

=== Coorg State ===
Constituency	Reserved	Member	Party
Coorg	None	N. Somanna	Indian National Congress

=== Delhi ===
Constituency	Reserved	Member	Party
New Delhi	None	Sucheta Kriplani	Kisan Mazdoor Praja Party
Delhi City	None	Radha Raman	Indian National Congress
Outer Delhi	None	Naval Prabhakar	Indian National Congress
Outer Delhi	None	C. Krishnan Nayar	Indian National Congress

=== Himachal Pradesh ===
Constituency	Reserved	Member	Party
Mandi Mahasu	None	Gopi Ram	Indian National Congress
Mandi Mahasu	None	Amrit Kaur	Indian National Congress
Chamba Sirmur	None	A. R. Sewal	Indian National Congress

=== Kutch State ===
Constituency	Reserved	Member	Party
Kutch East	None	Dholakia Gulabshankar Amrutlal	Indian National Congress
Kutch West	None	Khimji Bhawanji Arjun	Indian National Congress

=== Manipur ===
Constituency	Reserved	Member	Party
Inner Manipur	None	Jogeshwar Singh	Indian National Congress
Outer Manipur	None	Rishang	Socialist Party (India)

=== Tripura ===
No.	Constituency	Winner			Runner Up			Margin
1	Tripura East	Dasarath Deb	CPI	42866	Sachindra Lal Singh	INC	29650	13216
2	Tripura West	Birendra Chandra Dutta	CPI	53592	Durjoy Kishore Deb Barman	Independent	10987	42605

=== Vindhya Pradesh ===
No.	Constituency	Winner			Runner Up			Margin
1	Shadol Sidhi	Randaman Singh	KMPP		Uncontested			
1	Shadol Sidhi	Bhagwan Dutta Shastri	Socialist	182692	Ram Ratan Gupta	Independent	71704	4777
1	Shadol Sidhi	Anand Chandra Joshi (By-elections)	INC	36885	Premji	Independent	21528	15357
2	Rewa	Rajbhan Singh Tiwari	INC	26549	Kamlakar Singh	KMPP	23248	3301
3	Satna	Shiv Dutt Upadhyaya	INC	48800	Sada Shiv	RRP	17099	31701
4	Chattarpur Datiya Titamgarh	Ram Sahai Tiwari	INC	82104	Mata Din	ABJS	32171	49933
4	Chattarpur Datiya Titamgarh	Moti Lal Malaviya	INC	80767	Hansmukhi Sinha	Socialist	31819	48948

=== Nominated ===
Constituency	Member	Party
North-East Frontier Agency	Chow Khamoon Gohain	?
Anglo-Indian reserved seats in the Lok Sabha	Frank Anthony	Independent
Anglo-Indian reserved seats in the Lok Sabha	A. E. T. Barrow	Independent

== See also ==
- List of members of the 1st Lok Sabha
- Parliament of India
