= Patna Central Lok Sabha constituency =

Patna Central
- Former Lok Sabha constituency

Constituency details
- Country: India
- Region: East India
- State: Bihar
- District: Patna
- Established: 1951
- Abolished: 1957
- Total electors: 2,36,799
- Reservation: None

Patna Central Lok Sabha constituency was a parliamentary constituency in Bihar represented in the 1st Lok Sabha. It was created under the Delimitation of Parliamentary and Assembly Constituencies order, 1951 for the 1951–52 Indian general election and abolished following the delimitation carried out during 1952–53 on the basis of the 1951 Census, prior to the 1957 Indian general election.

== Formation and extent ==
Patna Central was one of four parliamentary constituencies in the then Patna district during the 1951–52 Indian general election, the first general election held in independent India. The others three constituencies were Pataliputra, Patna East, and Patna cum Shahabad. The constituency covered parts of Patna Sadar subdivision together with much of the Bihar subdivision of the then Patna district.

Under the Delimitation of Parliamentary and Assembly Constituencies order, 1951, the constituency comprised:

- Punpun and Masaurhi police stations of Patna Sadar subdivision; and
- Bihar subdivision of Patna district, excluding Bihar and Asthawan police stations.

The constituency's boundaries were based on the administrative divisions then in force, when the present-day Nalanda district formed part of Patna district.

== Election ==
=== General election, 1951–52 ===
Patna Central was a single-member constituency. Kailash Pati Sinha of the Indian National Congress was elected to represent it in the 1st Lok Sabha in the 1951–52 general election.

1951–52 Indian general election in Bihar: 02 Patna Central
Party	Candidate	Votes	%	±%
INC	Kailash Pati Sinha	66,982	50.93	
Independent	Chandrika Singh	20,581	15.65	
Hind Mazdoor Sabha	Bodh Narayan Prasad	19,225	14.62	
Socialist	Nageshwar Prasad	17,851	13.57	
Independent	Chandra Maula Prasad	6,867	5.22	
Turnout		131,506	55.53	New

== Abolition ==
Following the delimitation exercise undertaken during 1952–53 on the basis of the 1951 Census, Patna Central Lok Sabha constituency was abolished before the 1957 Indian general election. Its territory was redistributed among the newly constituted Barh and Nalanda parliamentary constituencies. The Punpun and Masaurhi police station areas became part of Barh, while the remaining areas of the former constituency were included in Nalanda. Although no direct successor constituency was designated, Nalanda incorporated most of the former constituency's territory and is generally regarded as its principal successor. Much of this area continues to form part of the present-day Nalanda parliamentary constituency following subsequent delimitations.

== See also ==
- 1951–52 Indian general election in Bihar
- 1st Lok Sabha
