= Krishna Sahi =

Indian politician (born 1931)

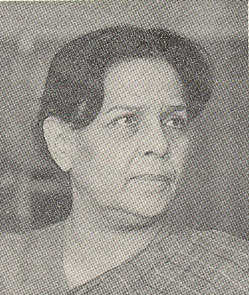

Minister of State, Government of India
- In office 12 May 1986 – 2 December 1989
- Prime Minister: Rajiv Gandhi
- Portfolios: Human Resource Development (1986–1988, 1989); Water Resources (1988–1989)
- In office 2 July 1992 – 16 May 1996
- Prime Minister: P. V. Narasimha Rao
- Portfolios: Industry (1992–1995); Heavy Industries (1993–1995); Civil Supplies, Consumer Affairs and Public Distribution (1995–1996)

Member of Parliament, Lok Sabha for Begusarai
- In office 1980–1989
- Preceded by: Shyam Nandan Mishra
- Succeeded by: Lalit Vijay Singh
- In office 1991–1996
- Preceded by: Lalit Vijay Singh
- Succeeded by: Ramendra Kumar

Member, Bihar Legislative Assembly
- In office 1972–1980
- Constituency: Mokama

Personal details
- Born: 16 February 1931 (age 95) Begusarai, Bihar, India
- Citizenship: India
- Party: Indian National Congress
- Spouse: Late B.P.N. Sahi
- Children: 1
- Parent: Late Mahesh Prasad Sinha
- Education: Patna University (B.A. (Hons)); Bihar University (B.L.)
- Profession: Advocate, Politician, Social worker

Krishna Shahi (born 16 February 1931) is a Congress politician from Bihar and a former union minister.

== Early life and education ==
Krishna Sahi was born on 16 February 1931 in Begusarai, Bihar. She was the daughter of Mahesh Prasad Sinha and completed a Bachelor of Arts (Honours) at Patna University, followed by a Bachelor of Laws (B.L.) from Bihar University.

== Political career ==
=== State politics ===
Sahi entered public life in the early 1970s, winning election to the Bihar Legislative Assembly from the Mokama constituency in 1972. She was re-elected in 1977, serving until 1980, during which time she focused on rural development and women’s education initiatives in Begusarai district.

=== Member of Parliament (Lok Sabha) ===
Sahi was first elected to the 7th Lok Sabha in the 1980 general election from Begusarai, defeating Shyam Nandan Mishra of the Janata Party with 272,234 votes (60.14%). She retained the seat in the 1984 election with 387,165 votes (73.35%),[a] but was unseated in 1989 by Janata Dal’s Lalit Vijay Singh. Returning to Parliament in 1991, she served a second stint through the 10th Lok Sabha, winning 343,050 votes (51.30%).

=== Ministerial roles ===
During her first parliamentary term, Sahi was appointed Minister of State in the Government of India under Prime Minister Rajiv Gandhi, serving in the Ministry of Human Resource Development (1986–1988), Water Resources (1988–1989), and later in the Ministry of Industry (1992–1995) and Heavy Industries (1993–1995) under Prime Minister P. V. Narasimha Rao. She also held the portfolio of Civil Supplies, Consumer Affairs and Public Distribution (1995–1996).

== Personal life ==
Sahi was married to B.P.N. Sahi and they had one child. Professionally trained as an advocate, she combined her legal background with a career in public service, advocating for women’s rights and rural welfare throughout her tenure.

== Social work and legacy ==
Beyond her legislative duties, Sahi was known for championing adult literacy programs and potable water schemes in rural Bihar. Post-retirement, she remained active in social welfare organizations, mentoring young women to enter public service and law.
