= Narayan Das (Bihar politician) =

Indian politician

Member of Lok Sabha

Member of the India Parliament for Darbhanga
- In office 1952–1957
- In office 1957–1962

Personal details
- Born: August 1902 Keoti
- Citizenship: India

Narayan Das (also spelled Narayan Dass, born August 1902, date of death unknown) was an Indian politician from the state of Bihar who served as a Member of the Parliament, representing Darbhanga in the Lok Sabha, the lower house of the Indian Parliament. He was elected to the 1st Lok Sabha in 1952 and to the 2nd Lok Sabha in 1957, on both occasions as a candidate of the Indian National Congress party.
