= Kailash Pati Sinha =

Indian politician

Member of parliament, Lok Sabha
- In office 1952–1957
- Preceded by: constituency created
- Succeeded by: constituency abolished
- Constituency: Patna Central, Bihar
- In office 1957–1962
- Preceded by: constituency created
- Succeeded by: Siddheshwar Prasad
- Constituency: Nalanda, Bihar

Personal details
- Born: February 1905 Patna, Bengal Presidency, British India
- Party: Indian National Congress

Kailash Pati Sinha was an Indian politician and Member of parliament from Bihar. A member of the Indian National Congress, he represented Patna Central in the 1st Lok Sabha and Nalanda in the 2nd Lok Sabha, having been elected in the 1951–52 and 1957 general elections, respectively.
