= Bali Ram Bhagat =

Indian politician (1922-2011)

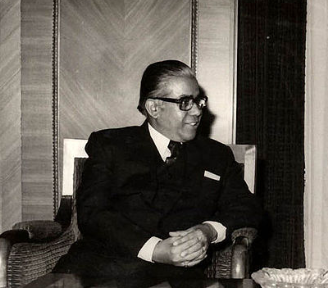

11th Governor of Rajasthan
- In office 30 June 1993 – 1 May 1998
- Preceded by: Dhanik Lal Mandal (Additional charge)
- Succeeded by: Darbara Singh

8th Governor of Himachal Pradesh
- In office 11 February 1993 – 29 June 1993
- Preceded by: Surendra Nath (Additional charge)
- Succeeded by: Gulsher Ahmed

13th External Affairs Minister of India
- In office 25 September 1985 – 12 May 1986
- Preceded by: Rajiv Gandhi
- Succeeded by: P. Shiv Shankar

6th Speaker of the Lok Sabha
- In office 15 Jan 1976 – 25 Mar 1977
- Deputy: G.G. Swell
- Preceded by: G. S. Dhillon
- Succeeded by: N. Sanjiva Reddy

Personal details
- Born: 7 October 1922 Patna, Bihar and Orissa Province, British India
- Died: 2 January 2011 (aged 88) New Delhi, India
- Spouse: Vidya Bhagat (m. 1944)
- Children: 2 (1 son and 1 daughter)
- Parent: Ham Rup Bhagat (father)

Bali Ram Bhagat (7 October 1922 – 2 January 2011) was an Indian politician and member of the Indian National Congress (INC). He has served as Member of Parliament (MP) in Lok Sabha representing Patna-cum-Shahabad from 1952 to 1957 and Shahabad (Arrah) from 1957 to 1977. Bhagat has also served as the 6th Speaker of the Lok Sabha and 13th Foreign Minister of India.

== Early life ==
BR Bhagat was born into a wealthy Yadav family in Patna, Bihar on 7 October 1922. His family was originally from Dashara village in Samastipur district. He joined the Indian National Congress in 1939 during the Indian independence movement and participated in the Quit India movement. He received a bachelor's degree from Patna College and obtained a master's degree in economics from Patna University.

== Career ==
After independence, Bali Ram Bhagat served as the Member of Parliament (MP) from Patna-cum-Shahabad in the 1st Lok Sabha (1952-1957) and then Shahabad for four terms (1957-1977). Bhagat lost his seat to Chandradeo Prasad Verma in the 1977 general election, where the Congress lost power in India for the first time. He won as MP from Sitamarhi in 1980 and Arrah in 1984.

Between 1963 and 1967, Bhagat served as the Minister of State for Planning as well as Finance. He was a Minister in the Ministry of Defence for a short period in 1967 before he became the Minister of State for External Affairs in the same year. Bhagat became a member of the cabinet in 1969 when he was appointed the Minister of Foreign Trade and Supply. Later, he was the Minister of Steel and Heavy Engineering for a period of eight months.

Bhagat served as the Speaker of Lok Sabha from 1976 to 1977, during the turbulent final year of Indira Gandhi’s first reign as prime minister. He served as Minister for External Affairs of India under Indira's son, Rajiv Gandhi, from 1985 to 1986.Baliram Bhagat lost the Lok Sabha elections in 1989 and 1991. Following these defeats, the Congress compensated it by appointing him as Governor of Rajasthan (1993–1998), and he also served briefly as Governor of Himachal Pradesh(1993).After the end of his term as Governor in 1998, he continued his involvement in public life.

As his political successor, he supported his nephew, namely, Nawal Kishore Choudhary who was a local village chief (mukhiya) for several decades from Bharko panchayat falling under Amarpur legislative assembly and was nominated as a Congress candidate in the 2000 Bihar Legislative Assembly election from Amarpur, Bihar Assembly constituency but unfortunately lost. Bali Ram Bhagat died in New Delhi on 2 January 2011.

== Positions held ==
Bali Ram Bhagat has served seven times as Lok Sabha MP.

He lost the 6th and 9th Lok Sabha election from Arrah in 1977 and 1989 respectively. Bhagat also lost the 10th Lok Sabha election from Samastipur in 1991.

#	From	To	Position	Party
1.	1952	1957	MP (1st term) in 1st Lok Sabha from Patna-cum-Shahabad	INC
2.	1957	1962	MP (2nd term) in 2nd Lok Sabha from Shahabad	INC
3.	1962	1967	MP (3rd term) in 3rd Lok Sabha from Shahabad	INC
4.	1967	1971	MP (4th term) in 4th Lok Sabha from Shahabad	INC
5.	1971	1977	MP (5th term) in 5th Lok Sabha from Shahabad	INC
6.	1980	1984	MP (6th term) in 7th Lok Sabha from Sitamarhi	INC (U)
7.	1984	1989	MP (7th term) in 8th Lok Sabha from Arrah	INC

Note

- The Patna-cum-Shahabad constituency was succeeded by Shahabad constituency in the 2nd Lok Sabha (1957).
- The Shahabad constituency was renamed as Arrah constituency in the 6th Lok Sabha (1977).

Preceded by Rajiv Gandhi	Minister for External Affairs of India; 1985–1986	Succeeded by P Shiv Shankar
