= Kondru Subba Rao =

Indian politician

Sri Kondru Subba Rao (1918–1985) was an Indian politician who represented Eluru in West Godavari district from 1952 to 1957.

== Early life and career ==
Rao was born in 1918 at Appa Rao Palem a small hamlet of Denduluru near Eluru of West Godavari district. His father Sri.Kondru Tathaiah was a farmer. Being from a family of cultivators, he was educated at Municipal High School, Eluru. He worked in Harijan associations until 1942. He organized Agricultural Labourers Associations from 1942 onwards. He served as President, District Agricultural Labourers Association; Member, District Committee of Communist Party of India .

== Political career ==
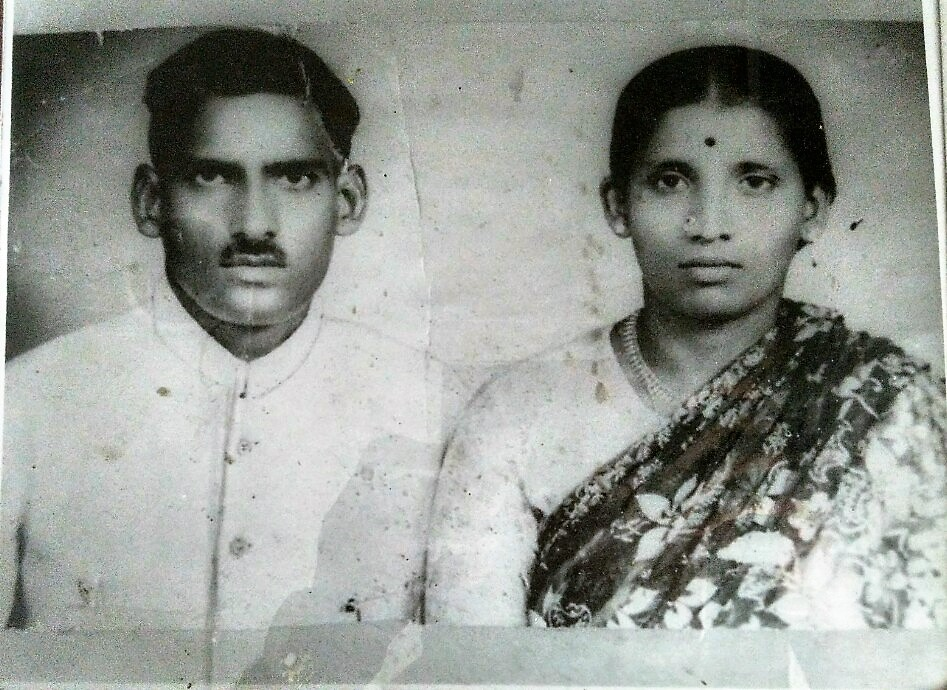
Sri Kondru Subba Rao & Smt. Kondru Bikshamma

Rao was elected as first Parliament member from Eluru, West Godavari district during 17 April 1952 to 4 April 1957. He was elected by Members of Legislative Assembly as Member of Legislative Council of Andhra Pradesh for the term 1974-1980.
