= M. N. Kaul =

Member of Parliament, Rajya Sabha
- In office 30 March 1966 – 2 April 1972
- Constituency: Nominated

Secretary General of the Lok Sabha
- In office 17 April 1952 – 1 September 1964
- Preceded by: Office established
- Succeeded by: S. L. Shakdhar

Personal details
- Born: 16 September 1901 Kashmir
- Died: 20 November 1984
- Education: Cambridge University and London School of Economics

M. N. Kaul (16 September 1901 – 20 November 1984) was Secretary of 1st Lok Sabha, 2nd Lok Sabha and Secretary-General of 3rd Lok Sabha (Lower House of Parliament of India). He was appointed Secretary of Lok Sabha Constituted after the First General Election of Lok Sabha in India. He retired on 31 August 1964 at the age of 63 and after 17 years of service as Secretary.

== Early life and career ==
He was born in Kashmir and studied at University of Cambridge and London School of Economics. He also practised as a lawyer at Allahabad High Court.

== Positions held ==
- Editor, Allahabad Law Journal 1927–37
- Secretary, Constituent Assembly (Legislative) 1947–50
- Secretary, Provisional Parliament 1950–52 and
- Secretary, Lok Sabha 1952–64
- Nominated to Rajya Sabha in April 1966
- Re-Nominated to Rajya Sabha in 1970
- Director-General of the Institute of Constitution and Parliamentary Studies 1973.

== Selected publications ==
- Parliamentary Procedure Since Independence
- Parliamentary Institutions and Procedures
- Practice and Procedure of Parliament (with S.L. Shakdhar)
- Impressions of China
- Report of the Tokyo I.P.C., 1960 and impressions of the visit to Japan
- Impressions of the Visit to the U.A.R, East European Countries and Russia
- Growth of Position and Powers of the Speaker and
- Conversations on Parliamentary Practice and Procedure (3 volumes)
