= Mulla Abdullabhai Taherali =

Indian politician

- Mulla Abdullabhai Taherali in 1952

Member of Parliament, Lok Sabha
- In office 1952–unknown
- Constituency: Chanda constituency, Madhya Pradesh

Personal details
- Born: Mulla Taherali Mulla Abdullabhai; 9 December 1918
- Party: Indian National Congress
- Spouse: Shrimati Sugrabai

Mulla Abdullabhai Taherali also known as Mulla Taherali Mulla Abdullabhai (born 9 December 1918, date of death unknown) was an Indian politician and the Member of Parliament (MP) of the first Lok Sabha in 1952 elected from Chanda constituency of Madhya Pradesh.

== Education and political career ==
Abdullabhai was educated at Anjuman High School in Nagpur. Besides serving as the Member of Parliament, Mulla was also a businessman. From 1946 to 1951, he served as the chairman of Legislative Assembly and from 1951 to 1952, he remained Vice President of the Nagpur Nagar Congress Committee, which was led by the Indian National Congress.

== Personal life ==
Mulla Abdullabhai Taherali was married at a young age of 20 to Shrimati Sugrabai on 20 April 1938.
