= Phani Gopal Sen Gupta =

Indian politician

Phani Gopal Sen Gupta (born 2 February 1905 in Purnea City, date of death 18 August 1991) was an Indian politician who served as a member of 1st Lok Sabha from Purnia (Lok Sabha constituency) in Bihar State, India.

He was elected to 2nd, 3rd and 4th Lok Sabha from Purnea, Bihar.

He was a leader and Freedom Fighter and was the Secretary of Purnea district Raadhi Kayastha Mahasabha.
