= Lalit Vijay Singh =

Indian politician (1931–1998)

Member of Parliament, Lok Sabha
- In office 1989–1991
- Preceded by: Krishna Sahi
- Succeeded by: Krishna Sahi
- Constituency: Begusarai

Personal details
- Born: 16 September 1931
- Died: 8 November 1998 (aged 67) New Delhi, India
- Party: Samajwadi Janata Party (Rashtriya)
- Other political affiliations: Janata Dal
- Spouse: Asha Singh
- Children: 1 son and 2 daughter
- Education: B.A., B.L.
- Alma mater: Patna Law College
- Profession: Police, Social Worker, Lawyer

Lalit Vijay Singh (16 September 1931 – 8 November 1998) was an Indian politician from Janata Dal. He was the member of 6th Lok Sabha from Begusarai elected in 1989 Indian General Elections. He was Union Minister of State, Defence from 21 November 1989 to 25 April 1990 in Chandra Shekhar ministry. He joined Indian Police Service in 1956 and took voluntary retirement in 1989 then joined Janata Dal. He was Advocate at Patna High Court.

Singh died in New Delhi on 8 November 1998, at the age of 67.

== Early life and education ==
Lalit Vijay Singh was born on 16 September 1931 in Barhiya, Begusarai district, Bihar. He completed a Bachelor of Arts and Bachelor of Laws (B.L.) from Patna Law College, Patna University.

== Indian Police Service career ==
Singh joined the Indian Police Service (IPS) in 1956 and served in various capacities across Bihar. After over three decades of service, he took voluntary retirement from the IPS in 1989 to enter electoral politics.

== Political career ==
=== Entry into electoral politics ===
Upon leaving the IPS, Singh joined the Janata Dal party in mid-1989. In his first foray into elections, he contested the 1989 Indian general election from the Begusarai Lok Sabha constituency.

=== Member of Parliament for Begusarai ===
In the November 1989 elections, Singh won the Begusarai seat on a Janata Dal ticket, defeating incumbent Krishna Sahi of the Indian National Congress with 333,570 votes (55.25% of the total valid votes). His victory marked a significant shift in a constituency previously dominated by the Congress.

=== Union Minister of State for Defence ===
On 21 November 1989, Singh was appointed Union Minister of State for Defence in the Chandra Shekhar ministry. He held this portfolio until the government's resignation on 25 April 1990, contributing to parliamentary debates on defence procurement and border security policies.

== Legal practice ==
Following his ministerial tenure, Singh practised as an advocate at the Patna High Court, specialising in criminal and constitutional law.

== Personal life ==
Singh was married to Asha Singh and had one son and two daughters. He maintained his residence at Leela Varta, P.P. Colony, Patna, Bihar.

== Death ==
Lalit Vijay Singh died in New Delhi on 8 November 1998 at the age of 67.

== Electoral performance ==
In the 1989 Lok Sabha election for Begusarai, there were 986,317 registered electors, of whom 603,707 cast valid votes (turnout 61.2%). Singh secured 333,570 votes (55.25%), defeating Krishna Sahi of the Indian National Congress, who received 258,849 votes (42.88%), a margin of 74,721 votes.
