= Suresh Chandra Mishra =

Indian politician and activist (1903–1993)

- Suresh Chandra Mishra (year unknown)

Member of Parliament, Lok Sabha
- In office 1952–1957
- Constituency: Monghyr constituency, Bihar

Personal details
- Born: 1903
- Died: 30 March 1993 (aged 89–90) Monghyr, Bihar.
- Party: Socialist

Suresh Chandra Mishra (1903 – 30 March 1993), also known as Pandit Suresh Chandra Mishra, was an Indian politician and independence activist who served as a member of First Lok Sabha from 1952 to 1957 for the Monghyr constituency in Bihar. In 1920 Mishra had participated in the Non-cooperation movement, launched by Mahatma Gandhi, aimed at obtaining full independence from the British rule in the country.

== Early life ==
Mishra was originally an agriculturist by profession, and a Social worker. He authored many publications in Hindi.

== Death ==
Mishra died on 30 March 1993 at the age of 90 in Monghyr, Bihar.
