= Muhammad Islamuddin =

Indian politician

Member of Parliament, Lok Sabha
- In office 1952–1957
- President: Rajendra Prasad; Sarvepalli Radhakrishnan
- Governors General: The Earl Mountbatten of Burma; Chakravarti Rajagopalachari (until 26 January 1950)
- Prime minister: Jawaharlal Nehru
- Constituency: Purnia

Member of Bihar Legislative Assembly
- In office 1936–1952
- Constituency: North Bihar(North East purnia)

Personal details
- Born: March 1894 Bengal Province, British India
- Died: Unknown
- Party: Indian National Congress
- Children: 14 including RAISUL ALAM Grandson MD NAUSHAD ALAM
- Parent: Mojibuddin Ahmed (father)
- Education: B.A. B.L.
- Occupation: Politician, Lawyer
- Source

Muhammad Islamuddin (born March 1894, ) was an Indian politician, lawyer and the Member of Parliament. He represented Purnia parliament constituency in 1952 after elected to the first Lok Sabha in India's first general election. He also served as the member of Bihar Legislative Assembly from 1936 to 1952.

He was affiliated with the Indian National Congress and served as the member of District Board for Purnia from 1924 to 1946, member of the Katihar Dispensary Committee from 1927 to 1939. In 1930, he was appointed as the commissioner of Purnia Municipality and served until 1933.

== Biography ==
He was born to Mojibuddin Ahmed in March 1894 in Bengal Province what is now known as Purnia district, India. He had fourteen children, including twelve sons and two daughters. His youngest son Raisul Alam who was looked after by his younger brother who was an eminent lawyer of Kishanganj district named Abdul Kaiyum.

He did his schooling from the Rajshahi Collegiate School, did his B.A from the City College, Calcutta and later obtained his law degree from the Department of Law, University of Calcutta.

He served at multiple posts throughout his life such as member of Purnia Hospital Committee from 1933 to 1942 and also member of Managing Committees besides being a member of Purnea Zilla School, 1938 to 1941. In 1935, he was appointed as the member of Purnia Girls' H. E. School until 1941, member of Barsoe H. E. School from 1938 to 1939, and Abadpur H. E. School in 1939. Later in 1937, he served as president of Lakshmipur H. E. School from 1937 to 1943 and member of Regional Transport Authority for North Bihar from 1945 to 1949.

He also served as a member of Medical Standing Committee from 1948 to 1951. In 1927, he served at Patna University Senate until 1951 and vice-chairman of Sadar Local Board for Purnia from 1927 to 1930. He also served vice-chairman of Purnia District Board twice from 1933 to 1939 and 1945 to 1946. In 1930, he was appointed as a secretary of Anjaman Islamia until 1936 and a member of All India Congress Committee in 1938.
