= Tarkeshwari Sinha =

Indian politician and independence activist

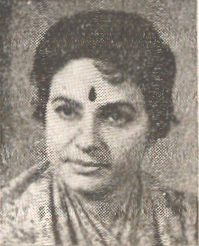

Union Deputy Minister for Finance
- In office 10 May 1958 – 9 June 1964
- Prime Minister: Jawaharlal Nehru; Gulzarilal Nanda; Lal Bahadur Shastri

Union Deputy Minister for Economic Affairs
- In office 2 April 1958 – 10 April 1958
- Prime Minister: Jawaharlal Nehru

Member of Parliament, Lok Sabha
- In office 1952–1957
- Preceded by: Constituency created
- Succeeded by: Constituency abolished
- Constituency: Patna East
- In office 1957-1971
- Preceded by: constituency created
- Succeeded by: Dharam Bir Sinha
- Constituency: Barh

Personal details
- Born: 26 December 1926 Tulsigarh, Chandi, Patna district, Bihar and Orissa Province, British India (present-day Nalanda district, Bihar, India)
- Died: 14 August 2007 (aged 80) New Delhi, India
- Party: Indian National Congress
- Spouse: Nidhidev singh
- Education: London School of Economics

Tarkeshwari Sinha (26 December 1926 – 14 August 2007) was an Indian politician and independence activist from Bihar. Among the first female politicians of the country, she took active role in the Quit India Movement. At the age of 26, she was elected to the 1st Lok Sabha from Patna East constituency in 1952. Subsequently, she was re-elected to the Lok Sabha in 1957, 1962 and 1967 from Barh constituency. She was the first female Deputy Finance Minister in the union cabinet led by prime minister Jawaharlal Nehru from 1958 to 1964. She had also led a delegation to the U.N. and Tokyo. Gulzar’s critically acclaimed movie, Aandhi was partly inspired by Tarkeshwari Sinha, apart from Indira Gandhi.

== Early life ==
She was born in Tulsigarh village near Chandi under Nalanda district in a Bhumihar family. She was a student of Bankipore Girls College, now known as Magadh Mahila College, in Patna. She was the President of the Bihar Students Congress, which had broken away from the All India Students Federation. She did her M.Sc. in economics from the London School of Economics.

She actively participated in the Quit India Movement.

== Career ==
She contested elections from the Barh constituency in Bihar. After Indian Independence, she won the first general assembly elections from the Patna East Constituency in 1952, after getting a ticket from the Indian National Congress. Through the INC, she got re-elected in 1957, 1962 and 1967.

Sinha appeared on the game show To Tell the Truth on 19 November 1957, fooling two of the four members on the panel.

She was considered close to Morarji Desai and was on his side in the battle of succession between Desai and Indira Gandhi to replace Lal Bahadur Shastri as Prime Minister. When Desai and other leaders resigned from Congress to form a splinter group, she, too, joined it. In the Indira wave during 1971 Lok Sabha elections, she lost from Barh as Congress(O) candidate to the Congress nominee Dharamvir Sinha, her first taste of electoral defeat. She lost the assembly election next year as well, and returned to Indira Gandhi's party. In 1977, she fought Lok Sabha election from Begusarai as a Congressional candidate and lost in the Janata wave as Congress was completely routed in Bihar. After this defeat, she fought a by-election to Lok Sabha in November 1978 from Samastipur as Congressional candidate but lost again.

Eventually, she retired from politics and began social work.

== Social Work ==
Tarkeshwari Sinha had set up a hospital, in Tulsigarh, in the memory of her brother Capt Girish Nandan Singh, pilot with Air India who died in an air crash in New Delhi. She had raised nearly Rs 25 lakh (a large amount at the time) for the construction of the two-floored hospital where treatment was almost free. She also took the initiative to construct a road to link the village with Chandi and Harnaut in Nalanda.
