= Sarangdhar Sinha =

Indian politician

Member of Parliament, Lok Sabha
- In office 1952–1957
- Preceded by: constituency created
- Succeeded by: constituency abolished
- Constituency: Pataliputra
- In office 1957–1962
- Preceded by: constituency created
- Succeeded by: Ram Dulari Sinha
- Constituency: Patna

Personal details
- Born: 6 February 1899
- Died: 30 June 1982 (aged 83)
- Party: Indian National Congress

Sarangdhar Sinha (6 February 1899 – 30 June 1982) was an Indian legislator, parliamentarian and academic. He was elected to the 1st Lok Sabha (1952-1957), lower house of the Parliament of India from Pataliputra in Bihar.

== Early life ==
Sarangdhar belonged to a landowning family from Repura in Ballia, Uttar Pradesh. His father Maharajkumar Ramdin Singh had shifted to Patna in the 19th century, where he established the Khadga Vilas Press, also known as the K.V. Press. Rai Bahadur Ram Ranvijay Singh and Ramji Singh were his elder and younger brothers, respectively.

Sarangdhar received his education at Muzaffarpur & Patna. He was also a doctorate in English from Calcutta University. In 1930, he began to actively participate in the Civil Disobedience Movement. He played a pivotal part in the Salt Satyagraha and the Quit India Movement, as a result of which he was jailed by the British Government on four occasions.

== Career ==
Sarangdhar Sinha became an M.L.A. (Bihar) and also served as Parliamentary Secretary for Education and Revenue (1937–39); Chairman of the Jail Reforms Committee, the Hindi Committee, the Harijan Committee, Higher Technological Education Committee, etc.

He was Vice Chancellor of Patna University (1949-52). He was also the President of the Bihar Chamber of Commerce (1949-51).

He was a member of the Constituent Assembly of India, tasked with the onerous responsibility of preparing free India's Constitution. Further, he represented Indian Universities at the Conference of the Association of the Universities of Commonwealth, New Zealand, 1950 before becoming Patna's first Member of Parliament (MP) in 1952.

He won the seat again in 1957. In the third Lok Sabha elections, he refused to contest the seat. The Congress MP did not recommend the name of any of his family members for the seat. Instead, he asked the Congress leadership to field a woman — Ramdulari Sinha — despite having a daughter himself. Ramdulari went on to win and become the first woman MP of Patna.

He also served as Vice Chancellor, Ranchi University (1962-65) and Vice Chairman, University Commission, Bihar.
