= Ramendra Kumar (politician) =

Member of Parliament, Communist Party of India

Ramendra Kumar is an Indian politician affiliated to the Communist Party of India (CPI) and is amongst the most prominent politicians of the Workers Movement in India. He is a former Member of Parliament (Lok Sabha) from the Begusarai constituency. He is National Secretariat member of the Communist Party of India and is National President of AITUC. He is also a former member of the Bihar Legislative Assembly where he represented Barkagaon for three consecutive terms from 1980-1995. He is the son of Yogendra Sharma, former member of Parliament (Lok Sabha and Rajya Sabha).
