= Apparao Palem =

- Village
- Interactive map of Apparao Palem
- Location in Andhra Pradesh, India Apparao Palem (India)
- Coordinates: 14°34′36″N 79°37′42″E
- Country: India
- State: Andhra Pradesh
- District: Nellore

Languages
  - Official: Telugu
- Time zone: UTC+5:30 (IST)
- PIN: 524322

Apparao Palem is a village in Atmakur, Nellore district, Andhra Pradesh, India. It is locally governed with a gram panchayat. The main occupation in the village is agriculture. Apparaopalem is on the banks of the Penna River. Paddy fields and mango orchards are commonly seen in the area.
