= Yogendra Sharma =

Indian politician (1915–1990)

Member of Parliament, Rajya Sabha
- In office 1972-1984
- Constituency: Bihar

Member of Parliament, Lok Sabha
- In office 1967-1971
- Preceded by: Mathura Prasad Mishra
- Succeeded by: Shyam Nandan Mishra
- Constituency: Begusarai, Bihar

Personal details
- Born: 20 August 1915 Naya-Tola, Rahimpur village, Khagaria, Then Monghyr District, Bihar, British India
- Died: 15 March 1990 (aged 74)
- Party: Communist Party of India
- Spouse: Geeta Sharma
- Children: Ramendra Kumar (politician)

Yogendra Sharma (20 August 1915 – 15 March 1990) was an Indian politician. He was a Member of Parliament, representing Bihar in the Rajya Sabha the upper house of India's Parliament. He also represented Begusarai Lok Sabha Constituency in the Lok Sabha, the lower house of Indian Parliament. He also led the Kisan Movement as the head of the All India Kisan Sabha as a member of the Communist Party of India.
