= Thirty-eighth Amendment of the Constitution of India =

The Constitution (Thirty-eighth Amendment) Act, 1975

Parliament of India
- Long title: An Act further to amend the Constitution of India.
- Citation: 38th Amendment
- Territorial extent: India
- Passed by: Lok Sabha
- Passed: 23 July 1975
- Passed by: Rajya Sabha
- Passed: 24 July 1975
- Assented to: 1 August 1975
- Commenced: 1 August 1975

Legislative history

Initiating chamber: Lok Sabha
- Bill title: The Constitution (Thirty-ninth Amendment) Bill, 1975
- Bill citation: Bill No. 54 of 1975
- Introduced by: H.R. Gokhale
- First reading: 22 July 1975

The Thirty-eighth Amendment of the Constitution of India, officially known as The Constitution (Thirty-eighth Amendment) Act, 1975, made the declaration of "The Emergency" final and conclusive. In particular it codified and enlarged the State's power to remove fundamental rights from its citizens during states of emergency.

Introduced on 22 July 1975, the bill received presidential assent in ten days. The Amendment barred judicial review of proclamations of emergency whether made to meet external, internal, or financial threats (Article 360 for the latter). It also barred judicial review of overlapping emergency proclamations, or ordinances promulgated by the President or by governors, and of laws enacted during emergencies that contravened Fundamental Rights.

== Ratification ==
The Act was passed when it was ratified by more than half of the State Legislatures. State Legislatures that ratified the amendment are listed below:

1. Andhra Pradesh
2. Assam
3. Bihar
4. Haryana
5. Himachal Pradesh
6. Karnataka
7. Kerala
8. Madhya Pradesh
9. Maharashtra
10. Meghalaya
11. Orissa
12. Punjab
13. Rajasthan
14. Sikkim
15. Tripura
16. Uttar Pradesh
17. West Bengal

Did not ratify:

1. Jammu and Kashmir
2. Gujarat
3. Manipur
4. Nagaland
5. Tamil Nadu
