= Shyam Nandan Sahay =

- Born: Bihar, India
- Died: India
- Resting place: Muzaffarpur
- Other name: Rai Bahadur Shyam Nandan Sahay
- Occupations: Educationist; Landlord; Legislator
- Known for: Educational administration
- Awards: Padma Bhushan

Shyam Nandan Sahay CIE was an Indian landlord, educationist, legislator and the founder vice chancellor of Babasaheb Bhimrao Ambedkar Bihar University. Born in the Indian state of Bihar, he also served as the vice chancellor of Patna University. He was a member of the 1st Lok Sabha, elected from Muzaffarpur Central constituency on Indian National Congress candidature. He won from Muzaffarpur again in 1957 but died in the same year. The Government of India awarded him the third highest civilian honour of the Padma Bhushan, in 1957, for his contributions to education. A road in Muzaffarpur is named after him.

== See also ==
- Indian general election, 1951–52
