= Shyam Nandan Prasad Mishra =

Indian politician

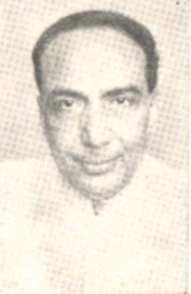

Minister of External Affairs
- In office 28 July 1979 – 13 January 1980
- Prime Minister: Charan Singh
- Preceded by: Atal Bihari Vajpayee
- Succeeded by: P. V. Narasimha Rao

Member of Parliament, Rajya Sabha
- In office 1962–1971
- Constituency: Bihar

Member of Parliament, Lok Sabha
- In office 1971–1980
- Preceded by: Yogendra Sharma
- Succeeded by: Krishna Sahi
- Constituency: Begusarai
- In office 1952–1962
- Preceded by: None (parliament established)
- Constituency: Madhubani

Personal details
- Born: 20 October 1920 Patna, Bihar and Orissa Province, British India (now in Bihar, India)
- Died: 25 October 2004 (aged 84) Patna, Bihar, India

Shyam Nandan Mishra (20 October 1920 – 25 October 2004) was an Indian independence activist and politician from Bihar. He was Member of Parliament for many years in both the Lok Sabha and Rajya Sabha. Initially a member of the Indian National Congress, he was later Leader of the Opposition in Rajya Sabha as a Congress (O) leader, and then a Janata Party MP and Minister for External Affairs in Charan Singh's government. He was imprisoned both during the Quit India Movement and the Emergency.

== Early life, family, and education ==
Shyam Nandan Mishra was born in Gonawan, Patna, India on 20 October 1920. His father was Murlidhar Mishra. Shyam Nandan was educated at Sursand, Muzaffarpur and Law College, Patna. He took active part in the Indian Independence Movement and was imprisoned in connection with the Quit India Movement during 1942–1943. He was associated with various social and political organisations. He was also editor of the publications Liberator and Bihar Vaibhav.

Mishra married Dhrubswamini Devi; they had one daughter. One of Mishra's cousins, Bhadrakali Mishra, was a prominent political leader in Nepal.

== Parliamentary career ==
Mishra's political career began with his membership in the Provisional Parliament of India, as the Constituent Assembly was called after the promulgation of the Constitution, between 1950–52. He was Parliamentary Secretary to the first prime minister, Jawaharlal Nehru, from June 1951 to May 1952.

In 1952, he was elected to the 1st Lok Sabha, and was re-elected in 1957. In this period, he was Deputy Minister for Planning in the Union government from 1954 to 1962. He then represented the State of Bihar in the Rajya Sabha for two terms, from December 1962 to April 1966 and again from April 1966 to March 1971. He was Deputy Leader of the Congress party in Parliament from 1967 to 1969, but after a split in the party, he joined the Congress (O) faction, and was its leader - and thus Leader of the Opposition in the Rajya Sabha - from December 1969 to March 1971.

He returned to the Lok Sabha in 1971, being elected from Begusarai. Mishra became close to the Janata Party and its leader Jayaprakash Narayan. In 1975, when the principal opposition party leaders were arrested in the first hours of the Emergency, Atal Bihari Vajpayee, Lal Krishna Advani, Madhu Dandavate and Shyam Nandan Mishra were detained together on 26 June in Bangalore, where they had gone to take part in a parliamentary commission.

After the Emergency, Mishra was re-elected from Begusarai as a Janata Party candidate as the party swept the 1977 election. He was made Chairman of the Joint Committee on the Jan Lokpal Bill. Two years later, Mishra was appointed Minister for External Affairs in Charan Singh's ministry.

From 1954 to 1973, Mishra was member of various Indian parliamentary delegations abroad and represented the country in several international events in Sri Lanka, Europe, and the United States.

== Death ==
Mishra died on 25 October 2004 at his daughter's residence in Kadamkuan, following a cardiac arrest. In his condolence message at his death, the Governor of Bihar, Justice Mandagadde Rama Jois, who had, during the Emergency, challenged Mishra's detention in the High Court of Karnataka, said "The nation has lost a great partiot, a freedom fighter, a true Gandhian and a Congressman. Mishra was an expert in planning and economy."

Preceded by Atal Bihari Vajpayee	Minister for External Affairs of India; 1979–1980	Succeeded by P. V. Narasimha Rao
