= 5th Lok Sabha =

Lower house Members elected in 1971

←	4th	6th	→
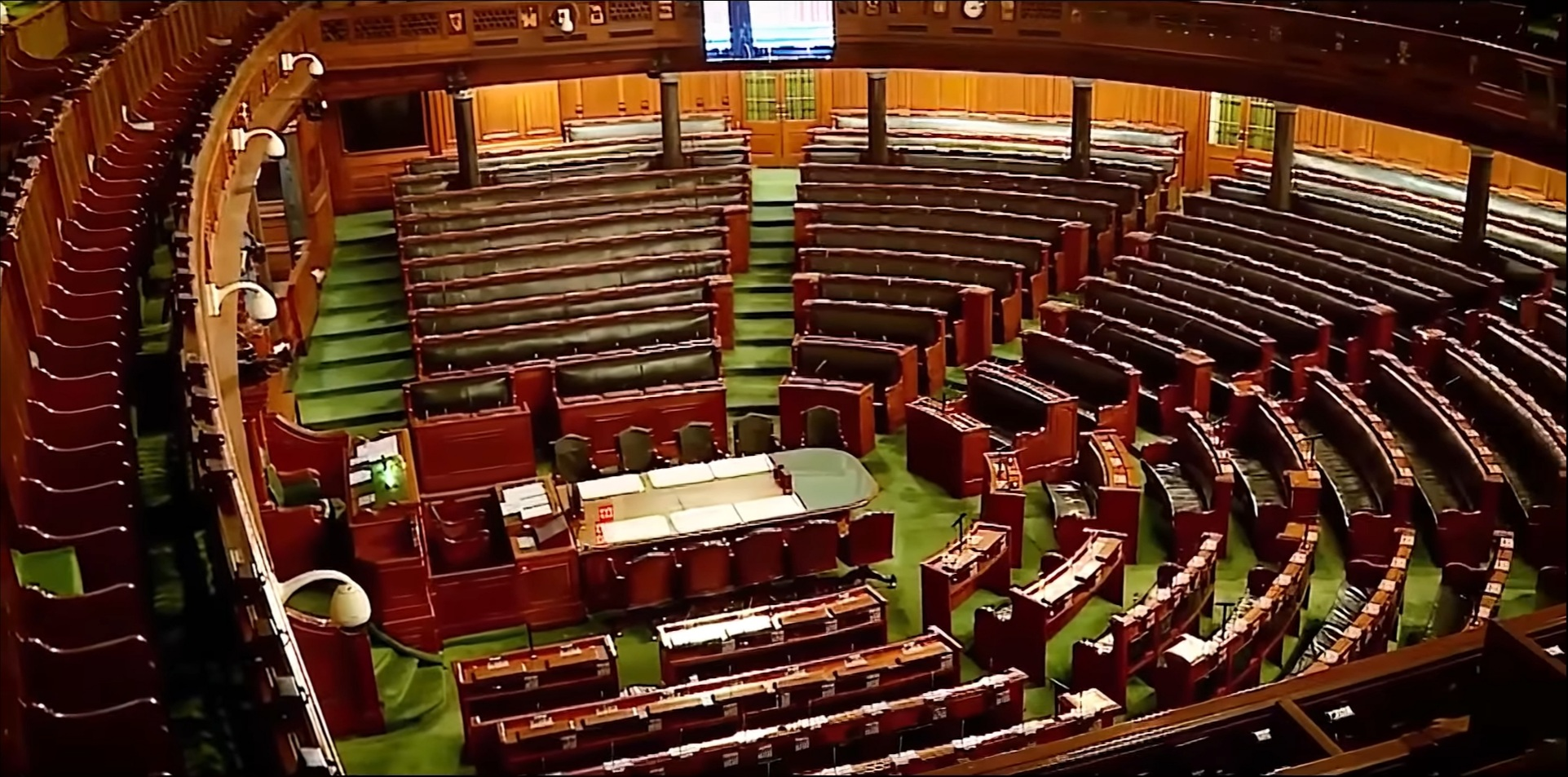
- View of Lok Sabha chamber in the Old Parliament House, New Delhi

Overview
- Legislative body: Indian Parliament
- Term: 15 March 1971 – 18 January 1977
- Election: 1971 Indian general election
- Government: Third Indira Gandhi ministry

Sovereign
- President: Fakhruddin Ali Ahmed
- Vice President: Gopal Swarup Pathak; B. D. Jatti

House of the People
- Speaker of the House: Gurdial Singh Dhillon (INC); Bali Ram Bhagat (INC)
- Leader of the House: Indira Gandhi (INC)
- Deputy Leader of the House: George Gilbert Swell (INC)
- Leader of the Opposition: Vacant
- Party control: Indian National Congress

The 5th Lok Sabha (15 March 1971 — 18 January 1977) of India was elected during February–March 1971 general elections. The Lok Sabha (House of the People) is the lower house in the Parliament of India which holds the term for generally five years, or less if dissolved early. The term of this House was extended two times by one year at a time. However, the House was dissolved after having been in existence for a period of five years, 10 months, and six days. 4 sitting members from Rajya Sabha were elected to 5th Lok Sabha after the 1971 Indian general election. Indira Gandhi became the Prime Minister, as was in the previous 4th Lok Sabha. However, in the next 6th Lok Sabha INC lost 198 seats, which was constituted after the 1977 Indian general election.

Of the total 521 seats, 22 seats (4.2%) were won by women; which was a reduction from previous Lok Sabha where 31 seats (5.9%) were represented by women. Since no other party had won a minimum of 10% seats, the position of the Leader of the Opposition was vacant. Gurdial Singh Dhillon, who had served as the Speaker towards the end of the term of 4th Lok Sabha, continued further till 1 December 1975; when he resigned and became the Minister of Shipping and Transport. He was the youngest speaker of the Lok Sabha.

During the term, Prime Minister Indira Gandhi imposed the Emergency and various constitutional amendments, like the 38th, 39th, and 42nd, were passed in the house which weakened judicial review and institutional checks.

== Important members ==
- Speaker:
  - Gurdial Singh Dhillon from 22 March 1971 to 1 December 1975
  - Bali Ram Bhagat from 5 January 1976 to 25 March 1977
- Deputy Speaker:
  - George Gilbert Swell from 27 March 1971 to 18 January 1977
- Secretary General:
  - S. L. Shakdher from 2 September 1964 to 18 June 1977
- Leader of Opposition:
  - Vacant

== List of members by political party ==
Members by political party in 5th Lok Sabha are given below-

S.No.	Party name	Number of MPs
1	Indian National Congress (R) (INC(R))	360
2	Communist Party of India (Marxist) (CPI(M))	25
3	Communist Party of India (CPI)	23
4	Dravida Munnetra Kazhagam (DMK)	23
5	Jan Sangh (Jan Sangh)	22
6	Indian National Congress (O) (INC(O))	16
7	Independent (Ind.)	14
8	Telangana Praja Samithi (TPS)	10
9	Swatantra Party (Swatantra Party)	8
10	Revolutionary Socialist Party (India) (RSP)	3
11	Samyukta Socialist Party (SSCP)	3
12	Kerala Congress (KEC)	3
13	All India Forward Bloc(AIFB)	2
14	Indian Union Muslim League (IUML)	2
15	Praja Socialist Party (PSP)	2
16	Akali Dal (Akali Dal)	1
17	All Party Hill Leaders Conference (APHLC)	1
18	Bangla Congress (Bangla Congress)	1
19	Bharatiya Kranti Dal (BKD)	1
19	Jharkhand Party (Jharkhand)	1
20	Republican Party of India (RPI)	1
21	United Goans Party (United Goans)	1
22	Utkal Congress (Utkal Congress)	1
23	Vishal Haryana Party (VHP)	1
