= Lal Hembrom =

Indian politician

Member of Parliament, Lok Sabha
- In office 1952-1927
- Constituency: Hazaribagh

Personal details
- Party: Indian National Congress
- Spouse: Bahamuni Murmu

Lal Hembrom is an Indian politician. He was elected to the lower House of the Indian Parliament the Lok Sabha from Hazaribagh, Bihar as a member of the Indian National Congress.
