= Begusarai Lok Sabha constituency =

Lok Sabha Constituency in Bihar

Coordinates: 25.4°N 86.1°E

Begusarai Lok Sabha
- Lok Sabha constituency

Constituency details
- Country: India
- Region: East India
- State: Bihar
- Assembly constituencies: Cheria-Bariarpur, Bachhwara, Teghra, Matihani, Sahebpur Kamal, Begusarai and Bakhri
- Established: 1951
- Total electors: 21,96,089 (2024)
- Reservation: None

Member of Parliament
- 18th Lok Sabha
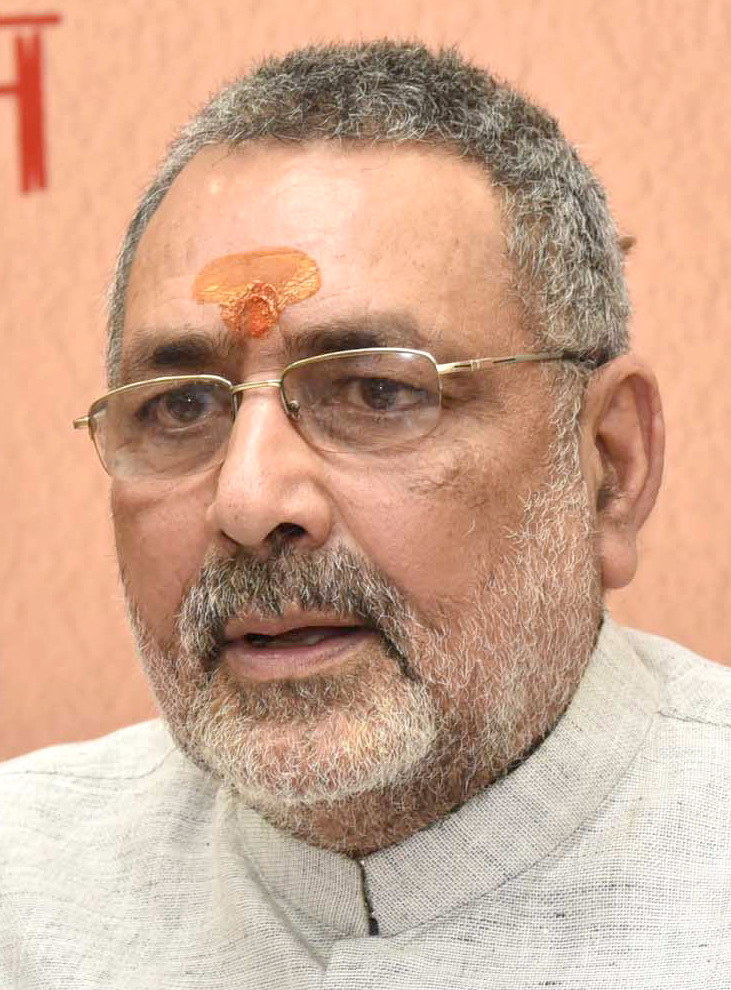
- Incumbent Giriraj Singh; Union Minister of Textiles
- Party: BJP
- Alliance: NDA
- Elected year: 2024
- Preceded by: Bhola Singh

Begusarai Lok Sabha constituency is one of the 40 Lok Sabha (parliamentary) constituencies in Bihar in India.

== Assembly Segments ==
From the 2009 Lok Sabha elections, Begusarai Lok Sabha constituency comprises the following seven Vidhan Sabha (Legislative Assembly) segments:

#	Name	District	Member	Party	2024 lead
141	Cheria-Bariarpur	Begusarai	Abhishek Anand	JD(U)	BJP
142	Bachhwara	Begusarai	Surendra Mehata	BJP	CPI
143	Teghra	Begusarai	Rajnish Kumar Singh	BJP	BJP
144	Matihani	Begusarai	Narendra Kumar Singh	RJD	BJP
145	Sahebpur Kamal	Begusarai	Satanand Sambuddha	RJD	BJP
146	Begusarai	Begusarai	Kundan Kumar	BJP	BJP
147	Bakhri (SC)	Begusarai	Sanjay Kumar	LJP(RV)	BJP

== Members of Parliament ==
Year	Name	Party
1952	Mathura Prasad Mishra	Indian National Congress
1957	Mathura Prasad Mishra	Indian National Congress
1962	Mathura Prasad Mishra	Indian National Congress
1967	Yogendra Sharma	Communist Party of India
1971	Shyam Nandan Mishra	Indian National Congress
1977	Shyam Nandan Mishra	Janata Party
1980	Krishna Sahi	Indian National Congress
1984	Krishna Sahi	Indian National Congress
1989	Lalit Vijay Singh	Janata Dal
1991	Krishna Sahi	Indian National Congress
1996	Ramendra Kumar	Independent
1998	Rajo Singh	Indian National Congress
1999	Rajo Singh	Indian National Congress
2004	Lalan Singh	Janata Dal (United)
2009	Monazir Hassan	Janata Dal (United)
2014	Bhola Singh	Bharatiya Janata Party
2019	Giriraj Singh	Bharatiya Janata Party
2024	Giriraj Singh	Bharatiya Janata Party

== Election results ==
=== 2024 ===
2024 Indian general election: Begusarai
Party	Candidate	Votes	%	±%
BJP	Giriraj Singh	649,331	50.15	▼6.33
CPI	Awadhesh Kumar Rai	5,67,851	43.86	▲21.83
NOTA	None of the above	22,382	1.73	▲0.06
Majority		81,480	6.29	▼28.16
Turnout		12,96,227	58.91	▼3.72
BJP hold		Swing		

=== 2019 ===
2019 Indian general elections: Begusarai
Party	Candidate	Votes	%	±%
BJP	Giriraj Singh	692,193	56.48	+16.75
CPI	Kanhaiya Kumar	2,69,976	22.03	+ 4.15
RJD	Tanweer Hassan	1,98,233	16.17	−18.15
IND.	Saurabh	18,638	1.52	New
IND.	Shambhu Kumar Singh	10,019	0.82	New
NOTA	None of the Above	20,445	1.67	−0.80
Majority		422,217	34.45	+29.04
Turnout		12,26,503	62.63	+2.03
BJP hold		Swing		

=== General Election 2014 ===
2014 Indian general elections: Begusarai
Party	Candidate	Votes	%	±%
BJP	Dr. Bhola Singh	428,227	39.73	New
RJD	Tanweer Hassan	3,69,892	34.32	New
CPI	Rajendra Prasad Singh	1,92,639	17.87	−5.08
IND.	Vaij Nath Paswan	12,143	1.13	New
IND.	Sushil Kumar	11,144	1.03	New
NOTA	None of the Above	26,622	2.47	New
Majority		58,335	5.41	−0.28
Turnout		10,77,855	60.60	+11.85
BJP gain from JDU		Swing	+11.09	

=== General Election 2009 ===
2009 Indian general elections: Begusarai
Party	Candidate	Votes	%	±%
JD(U)	Dr. Monazir Hassan	205,680	28.64	
CPI	Shatrughan Prasad Singh	1,64,843	22.95	
LJP	Anil Chaudhary	1,21,786	16.96	
INC	Amita Bhushan	74,565	10.38	
IND.	Narendra Kumar Singh	61,220	8.52	
IND.	Ram Dayal Bharti	21,389	2.98	
Majority		40,837	5.69	
Turnout		7,18,265	48.75	
JD(U) hold		Swing		

== See also ==
- Begusarai District
- List of constituencies of the Lok Sabha
