= Paul Jujhar Soren =

Indian politician

Member of Parliament, Lok Sabha
- In office 1952–1954
- Constituency: Purnea cum Santhal Paragnas

Personal details
- Born: c. 1893
- Died: 1954
- Party: Jharkhand Party

Paul Jujhar Soren (c. 1893 – February 1954) was an Indian politician. He was a Member of Parliament, representing Purnea cum Santhal Paragnas in the Lok Sabha the lower house of India's Parliament as a member of the Jharkhand Party.

Soren died in February 1954 at the age of 61.
