= Sushama Sen =

Indian politician

Member of Parliament, Lok Sabha
- In office 1952–1957
- Constituency: Bhagalpur South, Bihar

Personal details
- Born: 25 April 1889
- Party: Indian National Congress
- Spouse: Dr. P. K. Sen

Sushama Sen (born 25 April 1889, date of death unknown) was an Indian politician. She was elected to the Lok Sabha, the lower house of the Parliament of India from the Bhagalpur South, Bihar as a member of the Indian National Congress.
