= Brajeshwar Prasad =

Indian politician (1911–1979)

Member of Parliament, Lok Sabha
- In office 1952–1967
- Succeeded by: Ram Dhani Das
- Constituency: Gaya, Bihar

Personal details
- Born: 22 October 1911
- Died: 7 December 1979
- Party: Indian National Congress

Brajeshwar Prasad (22 October 1911 – 7 December 1979) was an Indian politician. He was elected to the Lok Sabha, the lower house of the Parliament of India from Gaya in Bihar as a member of the Indian National Congress.
