= Mathura Prasad Mishra =

Indian politician (1918–1987)

Member of Parliament, Lok Sabha
- In office 1952–1957
- President: Rajendra Prasad
- Prime Minister: Jawaharlal Nehru,
- Preceded by: Position established
- Constituency: Begusarai, Bihar
- In office 1957–1962
- President: Rajendra Prasad
- Prime Minister: Jawaharlal Nehru
- Constituency: Begusarai, Bihar
- In office 1962–1967
- President: Sarvepalli Radhakrishnan
- Prime Minister: Jawaharlal Nehru, Lal Bahadur Shastri, Indira Gandhi
- constituency: Begusarai, Bihar
- Succeeded by: Yogendra Sharma

Personal details
- Born: 1918 Pachamba, Begusarai Bihar, British India
- Died: 17 July 1987 (aged 69) Pune, Maharashtra, India
- Party: Indian National Congress
- Spouse: Tulsi Devi
- Education: B. N. College and Patna College, Patna
- Profession: Journalist

Mathura Prasad Mishra (1918 – 17 July 1987) was an Indian politician. He was elected to the first, second and third Lok Sabha, the lower house of the Parliament of India from Begusarai, Bihar as a member of the Indian National Congress for consecutively three terms.

Mishra died in Pune, Maharashtra on 17 July 1987, at the age of 69.
