= Mahendra Nath Singh =

Indian politician

Member of Parliament, Lok Sabha
- In office 1952–1962
- Succeeded by: Krishnakanta Singh
- Constituency: Maharajganj

Personal details
- Party: Indian National Congress
- Spouse: Sonamukhi Devi

Mahendra Nath Singh is an Indian politician. He was elected to the Lok Sabha, the lower house of the Parliament of India as a member of the Indian National Congress.
