= Banarsi Prasad Jhunjhunwala =

Indian politician

Member of Parliament, Lok Sabha
- In office 1957-1962
- Succeeded by: Bhagwat Jha Azad
- Constituency: Bhagalpur Central, Bihar

Personal details
- Born: 12 October 1888 Bhagalpur, Bengal Presidency, British India, (Now Bihar, India)
- Party: Indian National Congress

Banarsi Prasad Jhunjhunwala was an Indian politician. He was elected to the Lok Sabha, the lower house of the Parliament of India as a member of the Indian National Congress. He was also a member of the Constituent Assembly of India.
