= 2nd Lok Sabha =

Lower house Members elected in 1957

←	1st	3rd	→
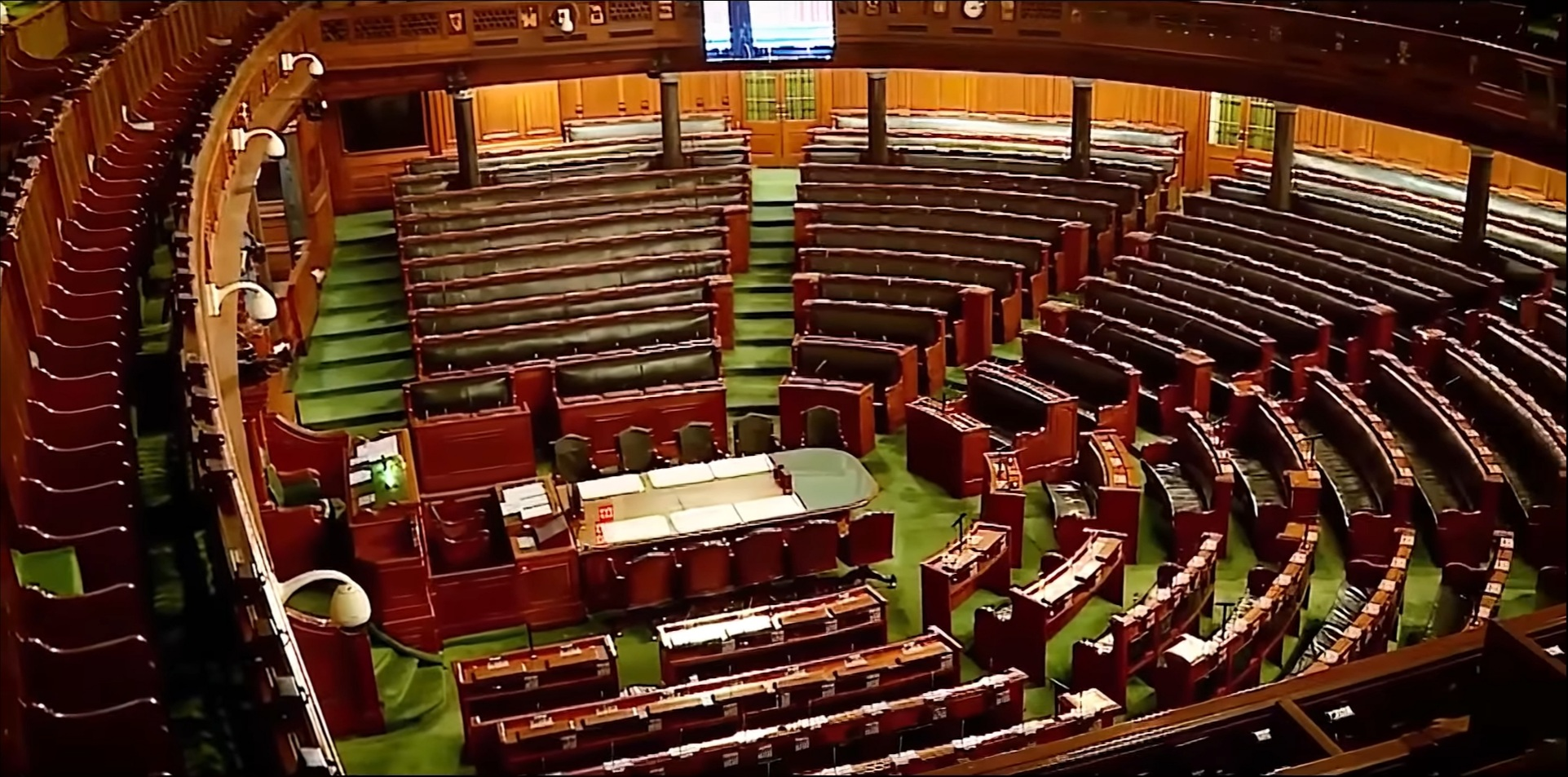
- View of Lok Sabha chamber in the Old Parliament House, New Delhi

Overview
- Legislative body: Indian Parliament
- Election: 1957 Indian general election

The Second Lok Sabha (5 April 1957 – 31 March 1962) was elected after the 1957 Indian general election. The 2nd Lok Sabha lasted its full tenure of five years till 1962.

15 sitting members from Rajya Sabha were elected to 2nd Lok Sabha after the Indian general elections, 1957.

== Members ==
- Speaker: M. Ananthasayanam Ayyangar (8 March 1956 – 16 April 1962)
- Deputy Speaker: Sardar Hukam Singh, (20 March 1956 – 31 March 1962)
- Secretary: M. N. Kaul (27 July 1947 – 1 September 1964)

=== List of members by political party ===
Members by the political party in 2nd Lok Sabha are given below

2nd Lok Sabha Party Name		Member of MP's (total 494)
Indian National Congress	INC	371
Communist Party of India	CPI	27
Praja Socialist Party	PSP	19
Ganatantra Parishad	GP	7
Jharkhand Party	JKP	6
Republican Party of India	RPI	6
Bharatiya Jana Sangh	BJS	4
Peasants and Workers Party of India	PWPI	4
Chota Nagpur Santhal Parganas Janata Party	CNSPJP	3
Forward Bloc (Marxist)	AIFB	2
People's Democratic Front	PDF	2
Akhil Bharatiya Hindu Mahasabha	ABHM	1
Indian Union Muslim League	IUML	1
Independents	-	41
Nominated Anglo-Indians	-	2

=== Women Members ===
State	Constituency	Name of Elected M.P.	Party affiliation
Andhra Pradesh	Eluru	Mothey Veda Kumari	Indian National Congress
Andhra Pradesh	Vijayawada	Komarraju Atchamamba	Indian National Congress
Andhra Pradesh	Vicarabad	Sangam Laxmi Bai	Indian National Congress
Assam	Goalpara (ST)	Rani Manjula Devi	Indian National Congress
Assam	Jorhat	Mofida Ahmed	Indian National Congress
Bihar	Banka	Shakuntala Devi	Indian National Congress
Bihar	Barh	Tarkeshwari Sinha	Indian National Congress
Bihar	Nawada	Satyabhama Devi	Indian National Congress
Bihar	Chatra	Vijaya Raje	Chota Nagpur Santhal Parganas Janata Party
Bihar	Hazaribagh	Rani Lalita Rajya Laxmi	Chota Nagpur Santhal Parganas Janata Party
Bombay	Girnar	Jayaben Shah	Indian National Congress
Bombay	Anand	Maniben Patel	Indian National Congress
Bombay	Nagpur	Anasuyabai Kale	Indian National Congress
Madhya Pradesh	Guna	Vijaya Raje Scindia	Indian National Congress
Madhya Pradesh	Bhopal	Maimoona Sultan	Indian National Congress
Madhya Pradesh	Baloda Bazar	Minimata Agam Dass Guru	Indian National Congress
Madras	Coimbatore	Parvathi Krishnan	Communist Party of India
Punjab	Ambala (SC)	Subhadra Joshi	Indian National Congress
Uttar Pradesh	Jhansi	Dr. Sushila Nayar	Indian National Congress
West Bengal	Malda	Renuka Ray	Indian National Congress
West Bengal	Nabadwip	Ila Pal Choudhury	Indian National Congress
New Delhi	New Delhi	Sucheta Kripalani	Indian National Congress

== See also ==
- Politics of India
- List of Indian constituencies
- 3rd Lok Sabha
