= Bihar Pradesh Congress Committee =

- President: Rajesh Kumar
- Chairman: Vacant
- Headquarters: Sadaqat Ashram, Patna-800010, Bihar
- Youth wing: Bihar Youth Congress
- Women's wing: Bihar Pradesh Mahila Congress Committee
- Ideology: Populism; Social liberalism; Democratic socialism; Social democracy; Secularism
- ECI status: A State Unit of Indian National Congress
- Alliance: MGB
- Seats in Rajya Sabha: 1 / 16
- Seats in Lok Sabha: 4 / 40
- Seats in Bihar Legislative Council: 1 / 75
- Seats in Bihar Legislative Assembly: 6 / 243

Election symbol

The Bihar Pradesh Congress Committee or (BPCC) is the political unit of the Indian National Congress for the state of Bihar. It is responsible for organizing and coordinating the party's activities and campaigns within the state, as well as selecting candidates for local, state, and national elections for all districts of Bihar. Its head office is situated in Patna at the Sadaqat Ashram.

The current working presidents are Shyam Sunder Singh Dheeraj, Ashok Kumar, Sameer Kumar Singh, and Qaukab Kadri.

== Organisation ==
The BPCC comprises several committees, including a screening committee for potential election candidates and, since July 2011, a committee coordinating interaction between the state organisation and that at the national level. There is also a monitoring committee, established around December 2010 to monitor the various Central Government schemes in Bihar. The former MLC Vijay Shankar Mishra is the Chairman of the recently reshuffled committee.

Other BPCC constituent organisations include:

- Bihar Pradesh Congress Committee Minority Department is the Bihar Chapter of Congress Minority Wing And Minnat Rahmani is State Chairman since 2014.
- According to a report by Dainik Bhaskar Arvind Sharma was appointed as the State Vice President of the Congress Sangathan Srijan Abhiyan in Bihar.
- Bihar Pradesh Congress Seva Dal is the Bihar chapter of the Congress
- Bihar Youth Congress is the Bihar chapter of the Indian Youth Congress
- NSUI Bihar is the Bihar chapter of the National Students Union of India
- INTUC Bihar is the Bihar chapter of the Indian National Trade Union Congress

== List of presidents ==
S.no	President	Portrait	Term	
1.	Maulana Mazharul Haque		1921	1930
2.	Rajendra Prasad		1931	1935
3.	Shri Krishna Sinha		1935	1938
(2).	Rajendra Prasad		1938	1946
4.	Abdul Bari		1946	1947
5.	Mahamaya Prasad Sinha		1947	1948
6.	Pandit Prajapati Mishra		1948	1950
7.	Laxmi Narayan Sudhanshu		1950	1952
(3).	Shri Krishna Sinha		1953	1959
9.	Abdul Qaiyum Ansari		1959	1962
10.	Rajendra Mishra		1962	1968
11.	Anant Prasad Sharma		1968	1971
12.	Viddyakar Kavi		1971	1973
13.	Sitaram Kesri		1973	1977
14.	Mungeri Lal (In-Charge)		1977	1977
15.	Kedar Pandey		1977	1980
16.	Rafique Alam		1980	1983
17.	Ram Sharan Prasad Singh		1983	1984
18.	Bindeshwari Dubey		1984	1985
19.	Dumar Lal Baitha		1985	1988
20.	Tariq Anwar		1988	1989
21.	Jagannath Mishra		1989	1990
22.	Lahtan Choudhary		1990	1992
(21).	Jagannath Mishra		1992	1992
23.	Md Hidayatullah Khan		1993	1994
24.	Sarfaraj Ahmad		1994	1997
(24).	Sarfaraj Ahmad		1997	1998
25.	Sadanand Singh		1998	2000
26.	Chandan Bagchi		2000	2000
27.	Shakeel Ahmad		2000	2003
28.	Ramjatan Sinha		2003	2005
(25).	Sadanand Singh		2005	2008
29.	Anil Kumar Sharma		2008	2010
30.	Mehboob Ali Kaiser		2010	2013
31.	Ashok Chaudhary		1 April 2013	27 Sep. 2017
32.	Kaukab Quadri (In-Charge)		27 Sep. 2017	17 Sep. 2018
33.	Madan Mohan Jha		17 Sep. 2018	5 Dec. 2022
34.	Akhilesh Prasad Singh		5 Dec. 2022	18 March 2025
35.	Rajesh Kumar		18 March 2025	Incumbent

== List of chief ministers of Bihar from the Congress Party ==
No.	Name	Took office	Left office	Tenure
1.	Sri Krishna Sinha	2 April 1946	31 January 1961	14 years, 304 days
2.	Deep Narayan Singh	1 February 1961	18 February 1961	17 days
3.	Binodanand Jha	18 February 1961	2 October 1963	2 years, 226 days
4.	Krishana Vallabh Sahay	2 October 1963	5 March 1967	3 years, 154 days
5.	Satish Prasad Singh	28 January 1968	1 February 1968	4 days
6.	B. P. Mandal	1 February 1968	2 March 1968	30 days
7.	Bhola Paswan Shashtri	22 March 1968	29 June 1968	332 days
7.	Bhola Paswan Shashtri	22 June 1969	4 July 1969	332 days
7.	Bhola Paswan Shashtri	2 June 1971	9 January 1972	332 days
8.	Harihar Singh	26 February 1969	22 June 1969	116 days
9.	Daroga Prasad Rai	16 February 1970	22 December 1970	309 days
10.	Kedar Pandey	19 March 1972	2 July 1973	1 year, 105 days
11.	Abdul Gafoor	2 July 1973	11 April 1975	1 year, 283 days
12.	Jagannath Mishra	11 April 1975	30 April 1977	5 years, 180 days
12.	Jagannath Mishra	8 June 1980	14 August 1983	5 years, 180 days
12.	Jagannath Mishra	6 December 1989	10 March 1990	5 years, 180 days
13.	Chandrashekhar Singh	14 August 1983	12 March 1985	1 year, 210 days
14.	Bindeshwari Dubey	12 March 1985	13 February 1988	2 years, 338 days
15.	Bhagwat Jha Azad	14 February 1988	10 March 1989	1 year, 24 days
16.	Satyendra Narayan Sinha	11 March 1989	6 December 1989	270 days

== List of deputy chief ministers of Bihar from the Congress Party ==
No.	Name	Took office	Left office	Tenure
1.	Anugrah Narayan Sinha	2 April 1946	5 July 1957	11 years, 94 days
2.	Ram Jaipal Singh Yadav	3 June 1971	9 January 1972	220 days

== List of union ministers from BPCC ==
Name	Ministry	Term	
Lalit Narayan Mishra	Minister of Railways	1973	1975
Jagjivan Ram	Minister of Agriculture and Irrigation	1967	1970
Jagjivan Ram	Minister of Defence	1970	1974
Jagjivan Ram	Minister of Agriculture and Irrigation	1974	1977
Ram Dulari Sinha	MOS in Information and Broadcasting	1980	1980
Ram Dulari Sinha	MOS in Labour	1980	1982
Ram Dulari Sinha	MOS in Steel and Mines	1982	1983
Ram Dulari Sinha	MOS in Commerce and Industry	1983	1984
Ram Dulari Sinha	MOS in Home	1984	1985
Abdul Ghafoor	Minister of Works and Housing	1984	1985
Abdul Ghafoor	Minister of Urban Development	1985	1986
Ram Lakhan Singh Yadav	Minister of Chemicals and Fertilizers	1994	1996

- Jagannath Mishra
- Baleshwar Ram
- Bindeshwari Dubey
- Chandrashekhar Singh
- Ram Subhag Singh
- Bali Ram Bhagat
- Meira Kumar

== Electoral performance ==
=== Bihar Legislative Assembly election ===
Year	Legislature	Leader	Seats Contested	Seats won	Change in seats	Votes	Percentage of votes	Vote swing	Outcome
1952	1st Assembly	Shri Krishna Sinha	322	239 / 330	New	39,51,145	41.38%	New	Government
1957	2nd Assembly	Shri Krishna Sinha	312	210 / 318	▼29	44,55,425	42.09%	▲0.71%	Government
1962	3rd Assembly	Binodanand Jha	318	185 / 318	▼25	40,75,844	41.35%	▼0.74%	Government
1967	4th Assembly	K. B. Sahay	318	128 / 318	▼57	44,79,460	33.09%	▼8.26%	Opposition
1969	5th Assembly	Harihar Singh	318	118 / 318	▼10	45,70,413	30.46%	▼2.63%	Government
1972	6th Assembly	Kedar Pandey	259	167 / 318	▲49	56,88,002	33.12%	▲2.66%	Government
1977	7th Assembly	Jagannath Mishra	286	57 / 324	▼110	41,01,522	23.58%	▼9.54%	Opposition
1980	8th Assembly	Jagannath Mishra	311	169 / 324	▲112	76,90,225	34.2%	▲10.62%	Government
1985	9th Assembly	Bindeshwari Dubey	323	196 / 324	▲27	95,58,562	39.3%	▲5.1%	Government
1990	10th Assembly	Jagannath Mishra	323	71 / 324	▼125	79,46,635	24.78%	▼14.52%	Opposition
1995	11th Assembly	Jagannath Mishra	320	29 / 324	▼42	56,22,952	16.27%	▼8.51%	Opposition
2000	12th Assembly	Shakeel Ahmad	324	23 / 324	▼6	40,96,467	11.06%	▼5.21%	Opposition
2005	13th Assembly	Ramjatan Sinha	84	10 / 243	▼13	14,35,449	5.00%	▼6.06%	Opposition
2005	14th Assembly	Sadanand Singh	51	9 / 243	▼1	12,28,835	6.09%	▲1.09%	Opposition
2010	15th Bihar Assembly	Mehboob Ali Kaiser	243	4 / 243	▼5	24,31,477	8.37%	▲3.37%	Opposition
2015	16th Bihar Assembly	Ashok Choudhary	41	27 / 243	▲23	25,39,638	6.66%	▼1.71%	Opposition
2020	17th Bihar Assembly	Madan Mohan Jha	70	19 / 243	▼8	39,95,319	9.48%	▲2.82%	Opposition
2025	18th Bihar Assembly	Rajesh Kumar	61	6 / 243	▼13	43,74,579	8.71%	▼1.29%	Opposition

=== Lok Sabha elections ===
Lok Sabha Elections
Year	Lok Sabha	Party Leader	Seats contested	Seats won	(+/−) in seats	% of votes	Vote swing	Popular vote	Outcome
1951	1st	Jawaharlal Nehru	54	45 / 55 (82%)	New entry	45.77%	New entry	45,73,058	Government
1957	2nd	Jawaharlal Nehru	51	41 / 53 (77%)	▼4	44.47%		44,50,208	Government
1962	3rd	Jawaharlal Nehru	53	39 / 50 (78%)	▼2	43.89%		43,65,148	Government
1967	4th	Indira Gandhi	53	34 / 53 (64%)	▼5	34.81%		47,49,813	Government
1971	5th	Indira Gandhi	47	39 / 53 (74%)	▲5	40.06%		59,67,512	Government
1977	6th	Indira Gandhi	54	0 / 54 (0%)	▼39	22.90%		47,81,142	Opposition
1980	7th	Indira Gandhi	54	30 / 54 (56%)	▲30	36.44%		73,77,583	Government
1984	8th	Rajiv Gandhi	54	48 / 54 (89%)	▲18	51.84%		1,29,70,432	Government
1989	9th	Rajiv Gandhi	54	4 / 54 (7%)	▼44	28.07%		86,59,832	Opposition
1991	10th	P. V. Narasimha Rao	51	1 / 52 (2%)	▼3	23.67%		70,07,304	Government
1996	11th	P. V. Narasimha Rao	54	2 / 54 (4%)	▲1	12.99%		44,46,053	Opposition
1998	12th	Sitaram Kesri	21	5 / 54 (9%)	▲3	7.27%		27,17,204	Opposition
1999	13th	Sonia Gandhi	16	4 / 54 (7%)	▼1	8.81%		31,42,603	Opposition
2004	14th	Sonia Gandhi	4	3 / 40 (8%)	▼1	4.49%		13,15,935	Government
2009	15th	Manmohan Singh	37	2 / 40 (5%)	▼1	10.26%		24,87,008	Government
2014	16th	Rahul Gandhi	12	2 / 40 (5%)	Steady	8.42%		30,21,065	Opposition
2019	17th	Rahul Gandhi	9	1 / 40 (3%)	▼1	7.85%		31,40,797	Opposition
2024	18th	Mallikarjun Kharge	9	3 / 40 (8%)	▲2	9.20%		39,83,882	Opposition

== District Congress Committee ==
Sr. NO.	Division	District	President
1.	Patna	Patna Town	Sashi Ranjan
1.	Patna	Patna Rural 1	Sumeet Kr Sunny
1.	Patna	Patna Rural 2	Gurujeet Singh
1.	Patna	Nalanda	Naresh Akela
1.	Patna	Bhojpur	Ashok Ram
1.	Patna	Rohtas	Amrender Pandey
1.	Patna	Buxar	Pankaj Upadhyay
1.	Patna	Kaimur	Radhe Shyam Kushwaha
2.	Magadh	Gaya	Santosh Kr Kushwaha
2.	Magadh	Nawada	Satish Kumar
2.	Magadh	Aurangabad	Rakesh Kr Singh
2.	Magadh	Jahanabad	Istiyak Azam
2.	Magadh	Arwal	Dhananjay Sharma
3.	Tirhut	West Champaran	Parmod Singh Patel
3.	Tirhut	East Champaran	Er Sashi Bhushan Rai
3.	Tirhut	Muzaffarpur	Arvind Mukul
3.	Tirhut	Sitamarhi	Raktu Prasad
3.	Tirhut	Sheohar	Noori Begum
3.	Tirhut	Vaishali	Mahesh Pd Rai
4.	Saran	Saran	Bachu Prasad Biru
4.	Saran	Siwan	Sushil Kumar Yadav
4.	Saran	Gopalganj	Om Prakash Garg
5.	Darbhanga	Darbhanga	Dyanand Paswan
5.	Darbhanga	Madhubani	Subodh Mandal
5.	Darbhanga	Samastipur	Abu Tameem
6.	Kosi	Saharsa	Mukesh Jha
6.	Kosi	Madhepura	Suryanarayan Ram
6.	Kosi	Supaul	Suryanarayan Mehta
7.	Purnea	Purnea	Bijender Yadav
7.	Purnea	Katihar	Sunil Yadav
7.	Purnea	Araria	Saad Ahmed
7.	Purnea	Kishanganj	Imam Ali
8.	Bhagalpur	Bhagalpur	Pravej Jamal
8.	Bhagalpur	Banka	Kanchana Singh
9.	Munger	Munger	Ashok Paswan
9.	Munger	Jamui	Anil Kr Singh
9.	Munger	Khagaria	Avinash Kumar Avinash
9.	Munger	Lakhisarai	Amresh Kr Anees
9.	Munger	Begusarai	Abhay Kr Sarjant
9.	Munger	Sheikhpura	Prabhat Kr Chandrawanshi
