= Sitaram Kesri =

Indian politician

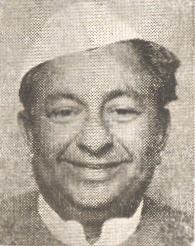

President of the Indian National Congress
- In office September 1996 – 14 March 1998
- Preceded by: P. V. Narasimha Rao
- Succeeded by: Sonia Gandhi

Member of parliament, Lok Sabha
- In office 1967–1971
- Preceded by: Priya Gupta
- Succeeded by: Gyaneshwar Prasad Yadav
- Constituency: Katihar

Member of Parliament, Rajya Sabha
- In office 1971-1986; 1988-2000
- Constituency: Bihar

Personal details
- Born: 15 November 1919 Danapur, Bihar and Orissa Province, British India
- Died: 24 October 2000 (aged 80) New Delhi, India
- Party: Indian National Congress
- Spouse: Kesher Devi
- Children: 1 son 2 daughters
- Education: Patna University

Sitaram Kesri (15 November 1919 – 24 October 2000) was an Indian politician and parliamentarian. He became a union minister and served as President of the Indian National Congress from 1996 to 1998.

== Political career ==
=== Pre-independence ===
Kesri became politically active at the age of 13, with his involvement in the Indian independence movement. Kesri was arrested for his political activities several times between 1930 and 1942. Kesri was a part of the famous Young Turks of Bihar Congress, during the independence movement along with Bindeshwari Dubey, Bhagwat Jha Azad, Chandrashekhar Singh, Satyendra Narayan Sinha, Kedar Pandey and Abdul Ghafoor – all future Chief Ministers of Bihar.

=== Post-independence ===
Kesri was elected president of the Bihar Pradesh Congress Committee in 1973 and treasurer of the All India Congress Committee (AICC) in 1980.

Kesri was elected to the Lok Sabha from the Katihar Lok Sabha Constituency in 1967 as a candidate of Congress party. He represented Bihar in the Rajya Sabha for five terms between July 1971 and April 2000, being reelected in April 1974, July 1980, April 1988, and April 1994. He was Union Minister during the regimes of Indira Gandhi, Rajiv Gandhi and P.V. Narasimha Rao as Prime Minister of India.

Kesri served as treasurer of the Congress party for more than a decade. In addition, he was elected unanimously as President of the Congress Parliamentary Party on 3 January 1997. After his exit from office in March 1998, he maintained a relatively low profile in politics. He was also denied party candidature for the Rajya Sabha once his last term ended in April 2000.

==== President of the Indian National Congress ====
After P.V. Narasimha Rao stepped down as president of the Congress in September 1996, Kesri was elected as the new president of the Indian National Congress over Sharad Pawar.

The following years were difficult for the Congress Party. Kesri's lack of popular support among the masses caused further damage to the party. Kesri's most controversial act was the sudden withdrawal of support to H.D. Deva Gowda's United Front government, which led to the fall of the government in April 1997. However, a compromise was reached and the United Front elected I.K. Gujral as the subsequent new leader with continued support from the Congress party.

In the first week of November 1997, part of the Jain Commission's report inquiring into the conspiracy angle of the assassination of Rajiv Gandhi was leaked to the press.

It was reported that the Jain Commission had indicted Dravida Munnetra Kazhagam (DMK) for its ties with the LTTE, the organisation involved in the assassination of Gandhi.

The DMK was one of the constituents of the United Front that was in power at the center. Moreover, the party had three ministers on the council of ministers headed by Prime Minister Inder Kumar Gujral. The Congress demanded removal from the government the ministers belonging to the DMK.

Between 20 and 28 November 1997, an exchange of letters took place between Kesri and Prime Minister Gujral; however, the prime minister refused to meet the demands of the Congress. Finally, on 28 November 1997, Congress withdrew its support for the Gujral government. When no alternative government could be formed, the Lok Sabha was dissolved, paving the way for midterm elections.

The Congress did not adequately prepare for the midterm elections. A number of senior leaders of the party, such as Rangarajan Kumaramangalam, Aslam Sher Khan, and other leaders, openly expressed displeasure with Kesri's leadership and left the party.

After Sonia Gandhi decided to campaign for the party, she replaced Kesri as the main party campaigner. Sonia attracted huge crowds in her campaign rallies but did not win the election for the party.

Nevertheless, the Congress did maintain a respectable tally of 140 seats. During the election campaign, there were a series of bomb blasts in Coimbatore, where BJP President Lal Krishna Advani was scheduled to address an election rally. About 50 people were killed in the blasts.

After the blasts, Kesri made a statement that the bomb blasts were the handiwork of the Rashtriya Swayamsevak Sangh and moreover, he had the proof of RSS involvement in the blasts. The RSS sued Kesri for defamation, but Kesri was granted bail by a city court in 1998.

After the electoral defeat, Kesri was stripped of his post in March 1998 by the Congress Working Committee. Sonia Gandhi was appointed president of the Congress party in his place. Kesri's removal from the Congress Working Committee is considered by some as a betrayal of the party constitution, considering how Pranab Mukherjee and others conspired to eliminate Kesri from the party for Sonia Gandhi.

Kesri, along with other members of the Working Committee including Tariq Anwar, was "roughed up" at Congress Party headquarters on 19 May 1999 by what has been described as an "angry mob" and "Congress goons", following the split in the Congress that led to the formation of the Nationalist Congress Party.

Kesri's tenure also saw the defection of many high-profile Congress leaders like G. K. Moopanar, Gegong Apang, Madhavrao Scindia & Mamata Banerjee.

== Election History ==
=== Rajya Sabha ===
Position	Party	Constituency	From	To	Tenure
Member of Parliament, Rajya Sabha (1st Term)	INC	Bihar	2 July 1971	2 April 1974	2 years, 274 days
Member of Parliament, Rajya Sabha (2nd Term)	INC	Bihar	3 April 1974	2 April 1980	5 years, 365 days
Member of Parliament, Rajya Sabha (3rd Term)	INC	Bihar	7 July 1980	6 July 1986	5 years, 364 days
Member of Parliament, Rajya Sabha (4th Term)	INC	Bihar	3 April 1988	2 April 1994	5 years, 364 days
Member of Parliament, Rajya Sabha (5th Term)	INC	Bihar	3 April 1994	2 April 2000	5 years, 365 days
