= List of Home Ministers of Bihar =

This is the list of Home Ministers of Bihar. Samrat Choudhary is the current minister in charge of the Home Department of Bihar.

== List ==
#	Portrait	Name	Term			Chief Minister	Party
1		Nitish Kumar	24 November 2005	20 May 2014	20 years, 345 days	Nitish Kumar	Janata Dal (United)
2		Jitan Ram Manjhi	20 May 2014	22 February 2015	12 years, 168 days	Nitish Kumar	Janata Dal (United)
3		Nitish Kumar	22 February 2015	20 November 2025	11 years, 255 days	Nitish Kumar	Janata Dal (United)
4		Samrat Choudhary	20 November 2025	Incumbent	349 days	Nitish Kumar	Bharatiya Janata Party

== See also ==
- Government of Bihar
- Chief Minister of Bihar
