= Kishanganj, Bihar Assembly constituency =

Constituency of the Bihar legislative assembly in India

- Constituency No. 54 for the Bihar Legislative Assembly

Constituency details
- Country: India
- Region: East India
- State: Bihar
- District: Kishanganj
- Established: 1951
- Total electors: 283,172
- Reservation: None

Member of Legislative Assembly
- 18th Bihar Legislative Assembly
- Incumbent Qamrul Hoda
- Party: INC
- Alliance: MGB
- Elected year: 2025
- Preceded by: Ijaharul Hussain

Kishanganj Assembly constituency is an assembly constituency in Kishanganj district in the Indian state of Bihar.

== Overview ==
As per Delimitation of Parliamentary and Assembly constituencies Order, 2008, No 54 Kishanganj Assembly constituency is composed of the following: Kishanganj municipality; Motihara Toluka, Singhia Kulamani, Halamala, Taisa gram panchayats of Kishnaganj community development block; and Pothia CD Block. In 2015 Bihar Legislative Assembly election, Kishanganj will be one of the 36 seats to have VVPAT enabled electronic voting machines.

Kishanganj Assembly constituency is part of No 10 Kishanganj (Lok Sabha constituency).

== Members of the Legislative Assembly ==
Following is the list of Members of Legislative Assembly from Kishanganj Assembly Constituency.

Year	Name	Party
1952	Rawatmal Agrawal	Indian National Congress
1952	Kamleshwari Prasad Yadav	Indian National Congress
1955^	Kamleshwari Prasad Yadav	Indian National Congress
1957	Abdul Hayat	Indian National Congress
1962	Mohammad Hussain Azad	Swatantra Party
1962	Yashoda Devi	Indian National Congress
1967	Shushila Kapoor	Praja Socialist Party
1969	Rafique Alam	Indian National Congress
1972	Rafique Alam	Indian National Congress
1977	Rafique Alam	Indian National Congress
1980	Mohammad Mushtaque	Janata Party (Secular)
1985	Mohammad Mushtaque	Lok Dal
1990	Mohammad Mushtaque	Janata Dal
1995	Rafique Alam	Indian National Congress
2000	Mohammed Taslimuddin	Rashtriya Janata Dal
2005	Akhtarul Iman	Rashtriya Janata Dal
2005	Akhtarul Iman	Rashtriya Janata Dal
2010	Mohammad Jawed	Indian National Congress
2015	Mohammad Jawed	Indian National Congress
2019^	Qamrul Hoda	All India Majlis-e-Ittehadul Muslimeen
2020	Ijaharul Hussain	Indian National Congress
2025	Qamrul Hoda	Indian National Congress

^by-election

== Election results ==
=== 2025 ===
2025 Bihar Legislative Assembly election: Kishanganj
Party	Candidate	Votes	%	±%
INC	Qamrul Hoda	89,669	39.49	+5.29
BJP	Sweety Singh	76,875	33.86	+0.44
AIMIM	Shams Aghaz	51,370	22.63	−0.83
NOTA	None of the above	1,498	0.66	+0.08
Majority		12,794	5.63	+4.85
Turnout		227,042	80.18	+19.34
INC hold		Swing		

=== 2020 ===
2020 Bihar Legislative Assembly election: Kishanganj
Party	Candidate	Votes	%	±%
INC	Ijaharul Hussain	61,078	34.2	−4.63
BJP	Sweety Singh	59,697	33.42	−0.38
AIMIM	Qamrul Hoda	41,904	23.46	+13.86
Independent	Tasir Uddin	2,069	1.16	
NOTA	None of the above	1,037	0.58	−0.06
Majority		1,381	0.78	−4.25
Turnout		178,610	60.84	−5.76
INC gain from AIMIM		Swing		

=== 2019 ===
As per the voter list of 2019, there were 286,240 electorates and 271 polling stations in this constituency. Voter turnout was 64.81% in the 2019 Lok Sabha elections.

2019 Bihar Legislative Assembly By election; Kishanganj
Party	Candidate	Votes	%	±%
AIMIM	Qamrul Hoda	70,469	41.46	
BJP	Sweety Singh	60,265	35.46	
INC	Sayeeda Banu	25,285	14.88	
AITC	Jannat Nasreen Khan	6,772	3.2	
Independent	Md Imran	5,093	3.0	
CPI	Firoz Alam	2,711	1.59	
NOTA	None of the above	2,635	1.55	
Majority		10,204	6.0	
Turnout		169,969	59.78	
AIMIM gain from INC		Swing		

=== 2015 ===
2015 Bihar Legislative Assembly election: Kishanganj
Party	Candidate	Votes	%	±%
INC	Mohammad Jawed	66,522	38.83	
BJP	Sweety Singh	57,913	33.8	
AIMIM	Tasiruddin	16,440	9.6	
NCP	Qamrul Hoda	8,025	4.68	
JMM	Trilok Chandra Jain	4,915	2.87	
CPI(M)	Shyam Nand Gupta	2,038	1.19	
Independent	Prahlad Kumar Sarkar	1,855	1.08	
Independent	Dhyani Paswan	1,639	0.96	
JAP(L)	M.K.Rizvi Alias Nanha Mushtaq	1,547	0.9	
NOTA	None of the above	1,100	0.64	
Majority		8,609	5.03	
Turnout		171,327	66.6	

=== 2010 ===
In the November 2010 state assembly elections, Dr. Mohammad Jawed of Congress won the Kishanganj seat defeating his nearest rival Sweety Singh of BJP. Contests in most years were multi cornered but only winners and runners up are being mentioned. Akhtarul Iman of RJD defeated Sanjeev Kumar Yadav of BJP in October 2005 and February 2005. Taslimuddin of RJD defeated Rajeswar Baid of BJP in 2000. Rafique Alam of Congress defeated Md. Mustaque Munna of JD in 1995. Md. Mustaque Munna of JD defeated Khalilur Rahman of Congress in 1990. Md. Mustaque Munna of LD defeated Md. Usman of Congress in 1985. Md. Mustaque Munna of Janata Party (Secular – Chanara Singh) defeated Rafique Alam of Congress in 1980. Rafique Alam of Congress defeated Badri Narayan Mandal of JP in 1977.
