= Lalit Narayan Mishra =

Indian politician (1923–1975)

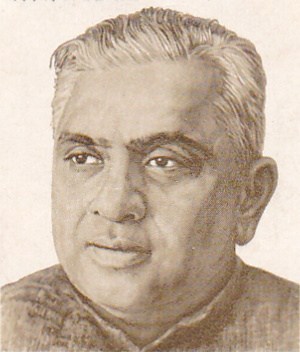

Ministry of Planning, Labour and Employment
- In office 1957–1960
- Prime Minister: Jawaharlal Nehru

Deputy Minister for Home Affairs
- In office 26 February 1964 – 27 May 1964
- Prime Minister: Jawaharlal Nehru
- In office 27 May 1964 – 9 June 1964
- Prime Minister: Gulzarilal Nanda
- In office 9 June 1964 – 11 January 1966
- Prime Minister: Lal Bahadur Shastri
- In office 11 January 1966 – 24 January 1966
- Prime Minister: Gulzarilal Nanda
- Succeeded by: Purnendu Sekhar Naskar

Deputy Finance Minister
- In office 24 January 1966 – 13 March 1967
- Prime Minister: Indira Gandhi
- Preceded by: Rameshwar Sahu
- Succeeded by: Jagannath Pahadia

Minister of State of Labour, Employment and Rehabilitation
- In office 13 March 1967 – 14 November 1967
- Prime Minister: Indira Gandhi
- Preceded by: Jagannath Rao
- Succeeded by: Bhagwat Jha Azad

Minister of State for Defence Production
- In office 14 November 1967 – 27 June 1970
- Prime Minister: Indira Gandhi
- Preceded by: Bali Ram Bhagat
- Succeeded by: Narendrasinghji Mahida

Minister of Foreign Trade
- In office 27 June 1970 – 4 February 1973
- Prime Minister: Indira Gandhi
- Preceded by: Bali Ram Bhagat
- Succeeded by: D. P. Chattopadhyaya

MInister of Railways
- In office 4 February 1973 – 3 January 1975
- Prime Minister: Indira Gandhi
- Preceded by: T. A. Pai
- Succeeded by: Kamalapati Tripathi

Member of Parliament, Lok Sabha
- In office 17 April 1952 – 4 April 1957
- Constituency: Darbhanga cum Bhagalpur, Bihar
- In office 5 April 1957 – 31 March 1962
- Constituency: Darbhanga, Bihar
- In office 15 March 1971 – January 3, 1975
- Constituency: Darbhanga, Bihar

Member of Parliament, Rajya Sabha
- In office 18 February 1964 – 2 April 1966
- Constituency: Bihar
- In office 3 April 1966 – 2 April 1972
- Constituency: Bihar

Personal details
- Born: 2 February 1923 Basanpatti, Supaul District, Bihar and Orissa, British India
- Died: 3 January 1975 (aged 51) Samastipur, Bihar, India
- Cause of death: Assassination
- Party: Indian National Congress
- Education: Master of Arts
- Alma mater: Patna University
- Occupation: Politician

Lalit Narayan Mishra (2 February 1923 – 3 January 1975) was an Indian politician who served as Minister of Railways in the government of India from 1973 to 1975. His political career started when he was made parliamentary secretary to the First Prime Minister of India, Jawaharlal Nehru at the insistence of Dr. Sri Krishna Sinha, the first Chief Minister of Bihar. In 1975, he died in a bomb blast at Samastipur railway station. The court case against the perpetrators was delayed for years and was finally completed in December 2014.

== Early life ==
Lalit Narayan Mishra was born on Basant Panchmi in 1923 at Basanpatti in Supaul District of in a Maithil Brahmin family. He gained a Master of Arts degree in economics from Patna University in 1948. He held nationalists Sri Krishna Sinha and Anugrah Narayan Sinha in high esteem.

== Political career ==
Mishra joined the Indian National Congress party and was a member of the first, second Lok Sabha and 5th Lok Sabha. He was a member of the Rajya Sabha in 1964 to 1966 then in 1966 to 1972. He was Parliamentary Secretary, Ministry of Planning, Labour and Employment (1957–60), Deputy Minister for Home Affairs (1964–66), Deputy Finance Minister (1966–67), Minister of State for Defence Production (1967–70). From 1970 till 4 February 1973 he was Minister of Foreign Trade. On 5 February 1973 he was made Cabinet Minister of Railways by then Prime Minister Indira Gandhi.

As a Minister of Foreign Trade, he was one of the first to recognize the potential of future Prime Minister of India, Dr Manmohan Singh and appointed him as his adviser at the Ministry of Foreign Trade. Their first meeting happened coincidentally on an India-US-Chile flight. Mr. Mishra the minister for commerce (then called minister for foreign trade) was on his way to Santiago, Chile, to attend a meeting of UNCTAD.

== Assassination ==
As Minister of Railways, he visited Samastipur on 2 January 1975 to declare the Samastipur-Darbhanga broad gauge railway line open. A bomb explosion on the day seriously injured him. He was taken from Samastipur to the railway hospital at Danapur, where he died the next day.

== Investigation and trial ==
Indira Gandhi blamed "foreign elements" for the murder, probably referring to the CIA. His brother Jagannath Mishra denied the claim that LN Mishra and Indira Gandhi had received bribes from the KGB as alleged in the Mitrokhin Archives; the Congress Party describes the book as "pure sensationalism and vague". On 26 July 2012, the Supreme Court stated that it will go into the causes of delay as even after 33 years, the trial was yet to conclude in the session court. As of July 2013, the 27-year-old man accused of the murder was 65 years old. Of the 39 witnesses he cited to prove his innocence, 31 have died. More than 20 different judges have heard his case over the years, supposedly on a day-by-day basis.

After 39 years of trial, on 8 December 2014 four men accused of Mishra's murder were found guilty by a Delhi court. A fifth accused in the case had died. Three Ananda Marga followers, Santoshanand, Sudevanand and Gopalji, along with advocate Ranjan Dwivedi, were held guilty of murdering Mishra and two others. They were sentenced to life imprisonment by district judge and were fined amounts ranging from Rs 25,000 and Rs 20,000. The court noted that Prabhat Ranjan Sarkar, the religious leader of Ananda Marga, was jailed following his accusations in a murder case so his followers murdered Mishra to build pressure on Indira Gandhi government to release Sarkar. Sarkar was later acquitted. The court also noted that the six Ananda Marga followers met at a village in Bhagalpur district, Bihar and planned the conspiracy in 1973. Appeal was filed by the convicted accused in Delhi High Court in 2015 wherein bail was granted and appeal was admitted. The Appeal filed by the convicted accused is now being heard at final hearing stage in Delhi High Court and in a recent development an application has also been filed in the appeal in High Court in lieu of Supreme Court order dated 13.10.2023 in SLP(Crl.) No. 13467/2023, Vaibhav Mishra v. CBI & Ors. which will be heard along with the main appeal.

== Legacy ==
A university, Lalit Narayan Mithila University, MBA institutes, Lalit Narayan Mishra Institute of Economic Development and Social Change, Patna (LNMI, Patna), L N Mishra Institute of Business Management, Muzaffarpur and a railway hospital in Gorakhpur, UP are named after him. The Government of India issued a postage stamp in his memory.

== See also ==
- List of assassinated Indian politicians
- List of politicians from Bihar
- UN Trade and Development III
