= Qamrul Hoda =

Indian politician

Member of the Bihar Legislative Assembly
- In office 24 October 2019 – 10 November 2020
- Preceded by: Mohammad Jawed
- Succeeded by: Ijaharul Hussain
- Constituency: Kishanganj

Personal details
- Party: Indian National Congress (2025)
- Other political affiliations: All India Majlis-e-Ittehadul Muslimeen (2019–2023); Rashtriya Janata Dal (2023-2025)

Qamrul Hoda is an Indian politician and a former member of the Bihar Legislative Assembly representing the Kishanganj Assembly constituency on behalf of the All India Majlis-e-Ittehadul Muslimeen. He was elected in a by-election held on 24 October 2019. He joined Rashtriya Janata Dal on 21 April 2023. He became the Member of Bihar Legislative Assembly in 2025 from Indian National Congress ticket.
