= Pararia mass rape =

Caste-based rapes in Bihar, India

Pararia 1988 mass rape
- Location: Pararia (near Deoghar), Bihar (in present day Jharkhand), India
- Attack type: Rape
- Perpetrator: 40 members of local unit of Bihar Police force
- Charges: Gang Rape
- Verdict: All accused were released in 1989

The Pararia mass rape was an incident of caste-based violence that affected several regions of Bihar, India, between the 1980s and 1990s. The incident took place in the village of Pararia, located 30 km (19 mi) from the temple town of Deoghar (in present day Jharkhand). Women from 26 families were gang-raped by a group of the Bihar Policemen. The victims were Yadavs, a caste classified as Other Backward Class in India.

== Incident ==
In 1988, a patrol group of the Bihar Police raided the Yadav village of Pararia. At least 14 women (some sources say as high as 19 and as low as 5) aged between 13 and 50 were reported to have been gang-raped, and male family members were brutally beaten. The police also looted valuables, jewelry, and utensils from each house in the village. Nose rings and accessories worn by the women were forcefully removed, causing injury. A 76-year-old man, while trying to protect his daughter-in-law from being raped, was beaten and anally penetrated with a lathi—a thick bamboo stick. A few civilians stated that the rapes were in retaliation for the assault of a police constable a few days earlier, but the official response was it was done in response to the villagers' refusal to move for the Punasi dam project; some of the assaulted women took part in judicial proceedings. The judge presiding over the case, O.P. Sinha, said, "Radhia has stated that she was thrown on the ground on her back. Two chowkidars caught her legs and hands, and three policemen committed rape with [sic] her. The defense argued that such a posture at the time of rape was inconceivable ... I also find much weight in the argument."

Over the case, the judge charged five police officers for "wrongful confinement" using force and 14 others for mass rape. It was one of the biggest alleged incidents of police excess in Bihar.

== Trial ==
Chief Minister Bhagwat Jha Azad took steps to ensure justice, but the investigation primarily depended upon the policemen of Bihar Police Force, who remained ineffective. The judge presiding over the judicial proceeding concluded from the medical report that one of the victims, Nonia Devi, was examined, and dead sperm were detected in her vaginal smears. According to a report, the judge took the view of the defense lawyer that she had been separated from her husband long ago, and the judge declared her a "freelancer". However, an investigation by India Today revealed that she stayed with her husband Moti Yadav. Author Arthur Bonner, relying upon their investigation, states that her husband was not willing to leave her even after public shame, as they had a four-year-old child, and it was not his wife's fault that she was raped.

Sinha was claimed to have given controversial statements in the explanation of his verdict. India Today reported Sinha's concluding statements were: "It cannot be ruled out that these ladies might speak falsehood to get a sum of Rs 1,000, which was a huge sum for them."

Chief Minister Bhagwat Jha Azad distributed one thousand rupees (as compensation) to each of the victims, and the reconstruction of their demolished huts began. According to authors Lora Prabhu and Sara Pilot in their book The Fear that Stalks: Gender-based Violence in Public Spaces, the assault and misbehaviour of the police were not ruled out, but the rape charge was dismissed; as such, eight policemen and six chowkidars (village guards) accused of rape were acquitted after one year of imprisonment. Prabhu and Pilot further believe that the Pararia incident was the surest way to defile the entire community, just like any other incident of sexual assaults during caste and communal riots, as women carry the honour of the entire community and raping them is the surest way of causing humiliation and shame to an entire community.

Ranjit Bhushan, a professor of Jamia Milia Islamia, believes that the dominance of upper-caste landlords in contemporary Bihar and the isolation of villages like Pararia are the reasons behind inter-caste clashes and the vulnerability of women in such places.

== Aftermath ==
It was originally thought that the victims of this incident were Dalits, but they were discovered to be Yadav women after a visit by officials. The incumbent government, as reported, announced that neither rape nor dacoity (banditry) had occurred. Veteran leader George Fernandes recommended that the government ensure proper relief to the victims' families and appoint special prosecutors to attend court proceedings, and suspended all the officials in the region, including the sitting superintendent of police. According to Fernandes, the chief minister's stance was apathetic, but a legislator named Hind Kesari Yadav organized a march of protesters from Pararia to Patna covering a distance of 200 km (120 mi).

== In popular culture ==
A movie directed by Sagri Chhabra, Rape As Assertion of Power, portrayed the incident at Pararia. The movie focuses on a village that is to be submerged under water for a major dam project, and the villagers protest for compensation. Rape is perpetrated to quell the protest by inflicting public shame on the stubborn villagers.
