= Ijaharul Hussain =

Indian politician

Bihar Legislative Assembly
- In office 2020–2025
- Preceded by: Qamrul Hoda
- Constituency: Kishanganj

Personal details
- Party: INC
- Occupation: Politics

Ijaharul Hussain is an Indian politician from Bihar and a Member of the Bihar Legislative Assembly. Hussain won the Kishanganj Assembly constituency on INC ticket in the 2020 Bihar Legislative Assembly election. Ijaharul Hussain defeated Sweaty Singh of BJP and sitting MLA of AIMIM Qamrul Hoda.
