= Prajapati Mishra =

Indian politician (1898–1952)

Prajapati Mishra (2 October 1898 – 1952) was an Indian politician from the state of Bihar.

Mishra was a Gandhian freedom fighter, a veteran congress leader and a member of Bihar Legislative Assembly (1951, Betia, Bihar). He took active participation in Quit India Movement as well as Non-Cooperation Movement. He became a president of Bihar Pradesh Congress Committee twice (1948–50 and 1952–53). He was born in Champaran District. His father's name was Sheetala Dutt Mishra and mother's name was Devaki Mishra. He was married to Ketaki Devi (MLA from Chanpatia assembly constituency, Bihar, 1957). In 1921, he joined Maghfoor Ahmad Ajazi and Khalil Das Chaturvedi and left his studies of B.A. in Patna in order to take part in the Non-Cooperation Movement.
