= 1985 Bihar Legislative Assembly election =

Election in India

1985 Bihar legislative assembly election
- 2nd and 5th March 1985

324 seats to the Bihar Legislative Assembly 163 seats needed for a majority
- Registered: 43,880,751
- Turnout: 56.27%

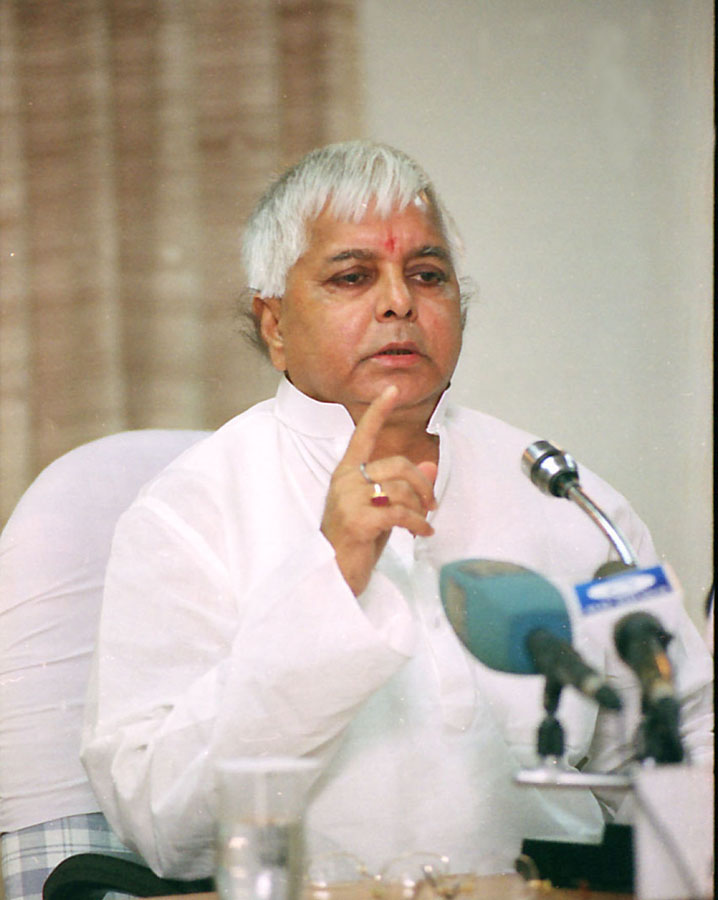
	Majority party	Minority party
Leader	Bindeshwari Dubey	Lalu Prasad Yadav
Party	INC	LKD
Seats won	196	46
Popular vote	9,558,562	3,573,173
Percentage	39.30%	14.69%
CM before election
Chandrashekhar Singh
INC
Elected CM
Bindeshwari Dubey
INC

Bihar Legislative Assembly election, 1985 was held in March 1985 to elect members to the Bihar Legislative Assembly. The Indian National Congress won a majority of seats and the popular vote and Bindeshwari Dubey became the new Chief Minister of Bihar.

== Result ==
Party	Party Flag	Seats Contested	Seats Won	Popular Vote	Percentage
Indian National Congress		323	196	9,558,562	39.30%
Lok Dal		261	46	3,573,173	14.69%
Bharatiya Janata Party		234	16	1,833,275	7.54%
Janata Party		229	13	1,754,705	7.21%
Communist Party of India		167	12	2,154,066	8.86%
Jharkhand Mukti Morcha		57	9	443,822	1.82%
Communist Party of India (Marxist)		44	1	392,375	1.61%
Indian Congress (Socialist)		59	1	160,159	0.66%
Socialist Unity Centre of India		1	1	17,890	0.07%
Independents		2804	29	4,349,057	17.88%
Total		4237	324	24,323,868	

== Elected members ==
Constituency		Winner				Runner Up				Margin	%
No.	Name (Note: SC and ST indicate constituencies reserved for Scheduled Castes and Scheduled Tribes respectively.)	Candidate	Party	Votes	%	Candidate	Party	Votes	%	Margin	%
1	Dhanaha	Nardeshwar Prasad Ksh.	LKD	12,224	26.62	Arun Kumar Tiwari	IND	11,974	26.08	250	0.54
2	Bagha (SC)	Triloki Harijan	INC	21,385	40.44	Punwasi Ram	LKD	14,723	27.84	6,662	12.60
3	Ramnagar	Arjun Vikram Sah	INC	21,865	34.83	Chandra Mohan Prasad	BJP	18,815	29.97	3,050	4.86
4	Shikarpur (SC)	Narsingh Baitha	INC	61,222	82.82	Bhola Ram Tufani	JP	7,824	10.58	53,398	72.24
5	Sikta	Dharmesh Prasad Verma	JP	41,257	55.23	Gausal Azam	INC	24,735	33.11	16,522	22.12
6	Lauria	Vishwa Mohan Sharma	INC	36,123	54.40	Ram Prasad Yadav	LKD	15,121	22.77	21,002	31.63
7	Chanpatia	Birbal Sharma	CPI	17,641	32.36	Prabhat Kishore Dwevedi	INC	14,472	26.55	3,169	5.81
8	Bettiah	Gauri Shanker Pandey	INC	31,459	47.98	Ahmad Ali	CPI	14,984	22.86	16,475	25.12
9	Nautan	Kamla Pandey	INC	18,588	37.21	Rewakant Dwevedi	CPI	13,724	27.47	4,864	9.74
10	Raxaul	Sagir Ahmad	INC	28,101	37.94	Rajnandan Prasad Rai	LKD	22,773	30.74	5,328	7.20
11	Sugauli	Suresh Kumar Mishra	INC	17,397	24.81	Ramashray Singh	CPI(M)	13,145	18.74	4,252	6.07
12	Motihari	Triveni Tiwari	CPI	32,408	40.80	Rajendra Prasad	INC	12,711	16.00	19,697	24.80
13	Adapur	Hari Shanker Prasad	INC	25,829	33.57	Braj Bihari Prasad	IND	20,845	27.09	4,984	6.48
14	Dhaka	Motiur Rahman	INC	51,438	50.59	Avanish Kumar Singh	BJP	29,049	28.57	22,389	22.02
15	Ghorasahan	Pramod Kumar Singh	INC	24,444	32.40	Lalbabu Prasad	LKD	18,305	24.27	6,139	8.13
16	Madhuban	Sitaram Singh	JP	18,000	25.04	Ram Nandan Singh	INC	15,427	21.46	2,573	3.58
17	Pipra (SC)	Nand Lal Chaudhary	INC	24,823	45.30	Sahdeo Paswan	LKD	15,449	28.20	9,374	17.10
18	Kesariya	Rai Hari Shankar Sharma	INC	31,452	40.86	Yamuna Yadav	CPI	24,814	32.24	6,638	8.62
19	Harsidhi	Md. Hedaitullah Khan	INC	27,789	40.95	Rajaram Prasad	CPI	23,648	34.85	4,141	6.10
20	Gobindganj	Yogendra Pandey	IND	33,564	43.85	Ram Shanker Pandey	INC	28,436	37.15	5,128	6.70
21	Kateya	Bachcha Choubey	JP	42,292	47.18	Manoj Kumar Mishra	INC	26,938	30.05	15,354	17.13
22	Bhore (SC)	Anil Kumar	INC	29,196	38.60	Indredeo Manjhi	IND	20,698	27.37	8,498	11.23
23	Mirganj	Parbhudayal Singh	INC	32,679	39.97	Raj Maugal Mishra	JP	29,113	35.61	3,566	4.36
24	Gopalganj	Surendra Singh	IND	25,703	33.64	Ambika Prasad Yadav	LKD	17,906	23.44	7,797	10.20
25	Barauli	Adnan Khan	INC	20,543	34.34	Ram Pravesh Rai	BJP	13,156	21.99	7,387	12.35
26	Baikunthpur	Braj Kishore Narain Singh	INC	48,362	55.00	Deodat Roy	LKD	34,030	38.70	14,332	16.30
27	Basantpur	Manik Chandra Roy	INC	51,105	51.15	Satyadeo Prasad	BJP	39,923	39.96	11,182	11.19
28	Goreakothi	Indra Deo Prasad	BJP	26,138	34.35	Ajit Kumar Singh	IND	23,733	31.19	2,405	3.16
29	Siwan	Awadh Bihari Choudhary	JP	46,021	54.87	Janardan Tiwary	BJP	22,989	27.41	23,032	27.46
30	Mairwa (SC)	Gorakh Ram	INC	31,647	56.94	Girdhari Ram	IND	8,809	15.85	22,838	41.09
31	Darauli	Shiv Shankar Yadav	LKD	21,774	29.99	Chandrika Pandey	INC	18,512	25.50	3,262	4.49
32	Ziradei	Tribhuan Singh	INC	21,855	32.50	Abhai Kumar Pandey	IND	13,019	19.36	8,836	13.14
33	Maharajganj	Uma Shanker Singh	JP	35,575	40.00	Anusuya Jaiswal	INC	25,461	28.63	10,114	11.37
34	Raghunathpur	Vijay Shanker Dubey	INC	29,455	37.50	Vikram Kuar	JP	24,090	30.67	5,365	6.83
35	Manjhi	Budhan Prasad Yadav	IND	20,583	29.37	Hajari Singh	JP	14,152	20.20	6,431	9.17
36	Baniapur	Uma Pnadey	INC	19,781	31.74	Ram Bahadur Ray	IND	17,031	27.32	2,750	4.42
37	Masrakh	Prabhu Nath Singh	IND	20,996	34.87	Harendra Kishore Singh	INC	16,818	27.93	4,178	6.94
38	Taraiya	Ram Das Rai	BJP	19,827	30.00	Rajendra Singh Kashyap	INC	18,954	28.68	873	1.32
39	Marhaura	Bhishma Prasad Yadav	INC	45,930	57.73	Ram Deo Singh	JP	15,830	19.90	30,100	37.83
40	Jalalpur	Sudhir Kumar Singh	INC	25,448	35.69	Abhay Raj Kishore Rai	CPI	22,944	32.18	2,504	3.51
41	Chapra	Janak Yadav	IND	46,438	50.99	Mithilesh Kumar Singh	INC	36,153	39.70	10,285	11.29
42	Garkha (SC)	Raghunandan Manjhi	INC	16,397	27.66	Ram Sunder Das	JP	15,251	25.73	1,146	1.93
43	Parsa	Chandrika Rai	INC	43,756	53.02	Ram Nath Vidyarthi	CPI	32,182	39.00	11,574	14.02
44	Sonepur	Laloo Prasad	LKD	34,401	45.56	Raj Narain Singh	INC	18,182	24.08	16,219	21.48
45	Hajipur	Moti Lal Sinha Kanan	LKD	39,592	45.65	Jagannath Prasad Rai	INC	21,395	24.67	18,197	20.98
46	Raghopur	Udai Narain Rai	LKD	35,389	37.16	Harihar Prasad Singh	JP	30,543	32.07	4,846	5.09
47	Mahnar	Munshi Lal Rai	LKD	39,784	41.06	Mitileshwar Prasad	INC	35,992	37.14	3,792	3.92
48	Jandaha	Tulsi Das Mehta	LKD	37,842	36.30	Virendra Singh	IND	34,066	32.68	3,776	3.62
49	Patepur (SC)	Baleshwar Singh Paswan	INC	31,973	46.24	Paltan Ram	LKD	31,570	45.66	403	0.58
50	Mahua (SC)	Dasai Chaudhary	LKD	42,789	54.66	Kapileshwar Ram Keshari	INC	27,342	34.93	15,447	19.73
51	Lalganj	Bharat Prasad Singh	INC	31,541	35.40	Kedar Nath Prasad	LKD	29,307	32.89	2,234	2.51
52	Vaishali	Brishin Patel	LKD	50,788	60.34	Rajendra Prasad Singh	INC	16,495	19.60	34,293	40.74
53	Paru	Usha Singh	LKD	70,814	61.60	Nitishwar Prasad Singh	INC	40,179	34.95	30,635	26.65
54	Sahebganj	Shiv Sharan Singh	INC	36,932	41.12	Krishna Ku. Sinha	LKD	36,115	40.21	817	0.91
55	Baruraj	Shashi Kumar Rai	LKD	58,000	56.98	Jamuna Singh	INC	21,916	21.53	36,084	35.45
56	Kanti	Nalini Ranjan Singh	SUCI	17,890	26.95	Tarkeshari Sinha	LKD	17,681	26.63	209	0.32
57	Kurhani	Sheonandan Rai	INC	35,790	40.55	Sadhusharan Sahi	JP	26,005	29.46	9,785	11.09
58	Sakra (SC)	Shivnandan Paswan	LKD	33,232	46.71	Arjun Kumar Ch.	INC	28,900	40.62	4,332	6.09
59	Muzaffarpur	Raghunath Pandey	INC	83,495	80.20	Rajeshwar Pd. Bhikari	BJP	13,197	12.68	70,298	67.52
60	Bochaha (SC)	Ramai Ram	LKD	20,303	31.96	Hari Lal Ram	INC	17,996	28.33	2,307	3.63
61	Gaighatti	Virendra Kumar Singh	INC	31,399	35.78	Maheshwar Prasad	LKD	27,861	31.75	3,538	4.03
62	Aurai	Ganesh Pd. Yadav	JP	47,925	53.95	Usha Kumari	INC	34,145	38.44	13,780	15.51
63	Minapur	Hind Keshari Yadav	LKD	25,307	28.20	Janak Dhari Kush	CPI	21,487	23.94	3,820	4.26
64	Runisaidpur	Nawal Kishore Shahi	JP	35,060	38.82	Vivekanand Giri	INC	32,411	35.89	2,649	2.93
65	Belsand	Raghubansh Pd. Singh	LKD	25,060	38.91	Digvijay Pratap Singh	INC	23,879	37.08	1,181	1.83
66	Sheohar	Raghunath Jha	JP	57,208	60.87	Bharat Prasad Singh	INC	34,410	36.61	22,798	24.26
67	Sitamarhi	Khalil Ansari	INC	19,254	25.09	Ramdeo Singh	CPI	14,262	18.59	4,992	6.50
68	Bathnaha	Ram Niwas	INC	40,761	43.65	Suryadeo Rai	IC(S)	23,181	24.82	17,580	18.83
69	Majorganj (SC)	Ram Vriksh Ram	INC	27,972	44.33	Dinkar Ram	JP	16,445	26.06	11,527	18.27
70	Sonbarsa	Kapoori Thakur	LKD	52,082	58.18	Anwarul Haque	IND	27,135	30.31	24,947	27.87
71	Sursand	Ravindra Prasad Sahi	IND	30,805	40.61	Nagendra Prasad Yadav	INC	28,478	37.54	2,327	3.07
72	Pupri	Ram Briksh Chaudhary	INC	43,204	50.94	Sitaram Yadav	LKD	22,828	26.92	20,376	24.02
73	Benipatti	Yugeshwar Jha	INC	32,277	40.60	Shaligram Rout	LKD	20,941	26.34	11,336	14.26
74	Bisfi	Sakeel Ahmad	INC	48,047	55.40	Raj Kumar Purbe	CPI	24,733	28.52	23,314	26.88
75	Harlakhi	Mithilesh Kumar Pandey	INC	40,457	52.28	Baidya Nath Yadav	CPI	25,291	32.68	15,166	19.60
76	Khajauli (SC)	Bilat Paswan Vihangam	INC	34,066	52.32	Ram Lakhan Raman	CPI	20,967	32.20	13,099	20.12
77	Babubarhi	Guna Nand Jha	INC	22,102	32.45	Deo Narayan Yadav	JP	20,424	29.99	1,678	2.46
78	Madhubani	Padma Chaubey	INC	22,467	33.30	Raj Kumar Mahaseth	JP	16,676	24.72	5,791	8.58
79	Pandaul	Kumud Ranjan Jha	INC	29,669	45.65	Naiyer Azam	JP	14,389	22.14	15,280	23.51
80	Jhanjharpur	Jagannath Mishra	INC	63,315	80.93	Ras Lal Yadav	LKD	7,387	9.44	55,928	71.49
81	Phulparas	Hemlata Yadav	INC	19,802	30.91	Devendra Pd. Yadav	IND	14,418	22.51	5,384	8.40
82	Laukaha	Abdul Hai Payami	INC	27,279	39.41	Lal Bihari Yadav	CPI	19,584	28.30	7,695	11.11
83	Madhepur	Harkhu Jha	INC	40,554	56.07	Rup Narain Jha	IND	28,116	38.87	12,438	17.20
84	Manigachhi	Madan Mohan Jha	INC	61,030	71.12	Rama Kant Choudhary	JP	18,521	21.58	42,509	49.54
85	Bahera	Mahendra Jha Azad	IND	20,695	28.31	Abdul Bari Siddiqui	LKD	18,970	25.95	1,725	2.36
86	Ghanshyampur	Mahabir Prasad	LKD	38,136	41.02	Harishchandra Jha	INC	28,138	30.26	9,998	10.76
87	Baheri	Permanand Thakur	INC	37,655	38.91	Ramanand Singh	LKD	17,858	18.45	19,797	20.46
88	Darbhanga Rural (SC)	Ramchandra Paswan	INC	28,188	47.31	Jagdish Choudhary	JP	14,962	25.11	13,226	22.20
89	Darbhanga	Asfak Ansari	INC	21,863	31.45	Ramashray Rai	IND	13,707	19.72	8,156	11.73
90	Keoti	Klim Ahmad	INC	28,158	32.02	Raj Kishore Yadav	JP	19,632	22.33	8,526	9.69
91	Jale	Lokesh Nath Jha	INC	40,385	46.65	Abdul Salam	CPI	18,998	21.95	21,387	24.70
92	Hayaghat	Umadhar Prasad Singh	IND	13,539	21.30	Kaphil Ahamad	LKD	10,517	16.55	3,022	4.75
93	Kalyanpur	Basistha Narain Singh	LKD	30,570	38.56	Ram Sukumari Devi	INC	23,823	30.05	6,747	8.51
94	Warisnagar (SC)	Ramsevak Hazari	IND	30,124	41.83	Shyama Kumari	INC	26,432	36.71	3,692	5.12
95	Samastipur	Ashok Singh	LKD	32,844	37.82	Jai Narain Rai	INC	24,744	28.49	8,100	9.33
96	Sarairanjan	Ramashray Ishwar	INC	29,428	31.04	Yashodanand Singh	BJP	20,240	21.35	9,188	9.69
97	Mohiuddin Nagar	Anugrah Narain Singh	INC	69,688	60.59	Ram Chandra Rai	IND	18,983	16.50	50,705	44.09
98	Dalsinghsarai	Vijay Kumar Choudhary	INC	36,516	42.26	Ram Vilas Roy Vimal	CPI	22,229	25.73	14,287	16.53
99	Bibhutpur	Chandra Vali Thakur	INC	53,931	48.96	Ramdeo Verma	CPI(M)	52,344	47.52	1,587	1.44
100	Rosera (SC)	Bhola Mandar	LKD	39,001	41.44	Satyendra Narain Ch.	INC	28,606	30.39	10,395	11.05
101	Singhia	Ashok Kumar	INC	57,756	70.48	Ram Jatan Paswan	CPI	22,417	27.36	35,339	43.12
102	Hasanpur	Rajendra Prasad Yadav	INC	27,518	37.38	Gajendra Prasad Himanshu	IND	20,834	28.30	6,684	9.08
103	Balia	Samsu Zeha	INC	22,747	39.26	Shri Narayan Yadav	LKD	18,887	32.60	3,860	6.66
104	Matihani	Pramod Kumar Sharma	INC	33,269	48.09	Deoki Nandan Singh	CPI	30,542	44.15	2,727	3.94
105	Begusarai	Bhola Singh	INC	32,939	45.78	Rajendra Prasad Singh	CPI(M)	23,554	32.74	9,385	13.04
106	Barauni	Shakuntala Sinha	CPI	38,588	49.24	Kamla Devi	INC	34,021	43.41	4,567	5.83
107	Bachwara	Ayodhya Prasad Singh	CPI	32,044	42.37	Prem Lata Devi	INC	27,572	36.46	4,472	5.91
108	Cheria Bariarpur	Harihar Mahto	INC	29,925	42.12	Sukhdeo Mahto	CPI	16,880	23.76	13,045	18.36
109	Bakhri (SC)	Ram Vinod Paswan	CPI	25,289	42.34	Yugal Kishore Sharma	INC	22,141	37.07	3,148	5.27
110	Raghopur	Amarendra Mishra	INC	57,599	58.73	Aseshwar Goit	LKD	16,447	16.77	41,152	41.96
111	Kishunpur	Vishwanath Gurmita	INC	37,846	39.80	Vinayak Pd. Yadav	LKD	28,949	30.45	8,897	9.35
112	Supaul	Pramod Kumar Singh	INC	53,112	49.72	Zahir Uddin Ahmad	LKD	41,312	38.68	11,800	11.04
113	Tribeniganj	Anup Lal Yadav	LKD	60,594	59.79	Jagdish Mandal	INC	34,184	33.73	26,410	26.06
114	Chhatapur (SC)	Kumbh Nr. Sardar	INC	39,723	48.95	Mahendra Nr. Sardar	LKD	32,270	39.76	7,453	9.19
115	Kumarkhand (SC)	Nawal Kishore Bharti	LKD	29,218	39.93	Yashoda Devi	INC	28,241	38.59	977	1.34
116	Singheshwar	Ramendra Kumar Yadav	LKD	28,672	32.29	Anant Kumar Singh	INC	27,821	31.33	851	0.96
117	Saharsa	Satish Chandra Jha	INC	36,930	42.66	Shankar Pd. Tekariwal	LKD	28,748	33.21	8,182	9.45
118	Mahishi	Lahtan Choudhary	INC	69,281	62.55	Devanand Yadav	LKD	14,250	12.86	55,031	49.69
119	Simri-bakhtiarpur	Ch. Mohammad Salahiddin	INC	63,117	48.56	Dinesh Chandra Yadav	LKD	61,441	47.27	1,676	1.29
120	Madhepura	Bholi Prasad Mandal	INC	36,822	39.53	Radha Kant Yadav	LKD	36,427	39.10	395	0.43
121	Sonbarsa	Surya Narayan Yadav	LKD	56,372	54.42	Tej Nr. Yadav	CPI	16,020	15.47	40,352	38.95
122	Kishanganj	Rajnandan Prasad	LKD	33,456	42.47	Singheshwar Mehta	INC	16,695	21.19	16,761	21.28
123	Alamnagar	Birendra Ku. Singh	LKD	33,708	41.23	Vidyakar Kavi	INC	32,987	40.35	721	0.88
124	Rupauli	Dinesh Kumar Singh	INC	31,423	41.23	Saryug Mandal	CPI	29,112	38.20	2,311	3.03
125	Dhamdaha	Amar Nath Tiwari	INC	54,517	62.12	Surya Na. Singh Yadav	LKD	25,872	29.48	28,645	32.64
126	Banmankhi (SC)	Rasik Lal Rishideo	INC	32,668	48.07	Rajendra Pd.	LKD	14,777	21.74	17,891	26.33
127	Raniganj (SC)	Yamuna Pd. Ram	INC	54,758	77.97	Bundel Paswan	JP	8,760	12.47	45,998	65.50
128	Narpatganj	Indra Nand Yadav	INC	22,926	32.25	Satya N. Yadav	LKD	14,195	19.97	8,731	12.28
129	Forbesganj	Saryu Mishra	INC	30,880	40.77	Rai Bahadur Keshri	BJP	17,439	23.02	13,441	17.75
130	Araria	Halimuddin Ahmed	INC	32,918	44.04	Nand Kishore Mandal	LKD	31,819	42.57	1,099	1.47
131	Sikti	Rameshwar Yadav	INC	42,775	46.93	Md. Azimudin	LKD	35,289	38.72	7,486	8.21
132	Jokihat	Taslimuddin	JP	44,046	56.83	Moidur Rahman	INC	28,283	36.49	15,763	20.34
133	Bahadurganj	Najmudin	INC	31,474	53.88	Shital Prasad Sinha	IND	9,412	16.11	22,062	37.77
134	Thakurganj	Mohamad Husen Azad	INC	44,882	55.83	Md. Suleman	JP	30,669	38.15	14,213	17.68
135	Kishanganj	Md. Mustaque	LKD	37,287	48.86	Md. Usman	INC	26,261	34.41	11,026	14.45
136	Amour	Jalil	IND	13,740	17.55	Chandra Shekhar Jha	JP	11,562	14.76	2,178	2.79
137	Baisi	Abdus Subhan	LKD	14,381	21.90	Syed Moinuddin Ahmad	INC	12,791	19.48	1,590	2.42
138	Kasba	Syed Gulam Hussain	INC	24,083	29.39	Sheocharan Mehta	LKD	21,718	26.51	2,365	2.88
139	Purnea	Ajit Chandras	CPI(M)	34,790	48.00	Kamal Deo Narayan Sinha	INC	25,716	35.48	9,074	12.52
140	Korha (SC)	Vishwa Nath Rishi	INC	22,341	45.97	Kuldip Paswan	IND	8,655	17.81	13,686	28.16
141	Barari	Mansoor Alam	LKD	16,527	25.32	Prem Nath Jai	IND	13,623	20.87	2,904	4.45
142	Katihar	Satya Narayan Prasad	INC	35,419	51.64	Jagbandhu Adhikari	BJP	20,049	29.23	15,370	22.41
143	Kadwa	Usman Ghani	INC	33,362	50.78	Khaja Shahid Hussain	IND	7,074	10.77	26,288	40.01
144	Barsoi	Byula Doja	INC	31,690	45.99	Mahboob Alam	CPI(M)	14,189	20.59	17,501	25.40
145	Pranpur	Mangan Insan	INC	34,891	58.48	Abdul Jalil	IND	10,050	16.85	24,841	41.63
146	Manihari	Md. Mobarak Hussain	INC	33,029	55.34	Ram Sipahi Yadav	JP	8,040	13.47	24,989	41.87
147	Rajmahal	Dhruva Bhagat	BJP	29,727	41.62	Dasrath Mishra	INC	29,330	41.06	397	0.56
148	Borio (SC)	Jon Hembrom	INC	22,899	45.77	Sant Lal Marandi	JMM	12,426	24.84	10,473	20.93
149	Barhait (ST)	Thomas Hansda	INC	37,753	59.97	Masih Soren	JMM	19,453	30.90	18,300	29.07
150	Litipara (ST)	Simon Marandi	JMM	32,591	66.50	Khisto Chand Malto	INC	14,777	30.15	17,814	36.35
151	Pakaur	Hazi Mhd. Ainul Haque	INC	30,278	44.31	Abdul Hakim	CPI(M)	18,029	26.39	12,249	17.92
152	Maheshpur (ST)	Debidhan Basera	JMM	20,217	44.43	Kalidas Murmu	INC	17,192	37.78	3,025	6.65
153	Sikaripara (ST)	David Murmu	JMM	14,692	36.56	Nalin Soren	IND	9,478	23.58	5,214	12.98
154	Nala	Bisheshwar Khan	CPI	30,970	50.09	Raj Kumari Devi	INC	24,305	39.31	6,665	10.78
155	Jamtara	Md. Furkan Ansari	INC	25,193	41.09	Arun Kumar Bose	CPI	22,022	35.92	3,171	5.17
156	Sarath	Udai Shanker Singh	IND	31,164	41.91	Shashank Shekher Bhokta	INC	17,379	23.37	13,785	18.54
157	Madhupur	Krishna Nand Jha	INC	41,305	59.27	Chanchal Devi	BJP	16,649	23.89	24,656	35.38
158	Deoghar (SC)	Baidyanath Das	INC	16,589	37.78	Suresh Paswan	CPI	12,922	29.43	3,667	8.35
159	Jarmundi	Abhay Kant Prasad	BJP	16,776	32.62	Jawahar Prasad Singh	IND	14,331	27.87	2,445	4.75
160	Dumka (ST)	Stephan Marandi	JMM	22,813	42.29	Stanshila Hembrom	INC	21,575	39.99	1,238	2.30
161	Jama (ST)	Shibu Soren	JMM	34,828	66.20	Prome Murmu	INC	16,484	31.33	18,344	34.87
162	Poreyahat	Suraj Mandal	JMM	31,055	43.39	Sanath Rout	INC	28,369	39.64	2,686	3.75
163	Godda	Sumrit Mandal	JMM	33,739	42.12	Hemant Ku. Jha	INC	33,101	41.32	638	0.80
164	Mahagama	Awadh Bihari Singh	INC	53,742	63.58	Sidik	LKD	18,257	21.60	35,485	41.98
165	Pirpainti	Dilip Kumar Sinha	INC	40,952	47.35	Ambika Prasad	CPI	36,863	42.62	4,089	4.73
166	Colgong	Sada Nand Singh	IND	35,867	40.89	Krishna Mohan Singh	INC	23,445	26.73	12,422	14.16
167	Nathnagar	Chun Chun Pra Yadav	LKD	55,104	64.42	Surendra Pra Yadav	INC	16,395	19.17	38,709	45.25
168	Bhagalpur	Sheo Chandra Jha	INC	51,755	61.07	Faiyaz Bhagalpuri	JP	12,996	15.34	38,759	45.73
169	Gopalpur	Madan Prasad Singh	INC	41,004	47.57	Maniram Singh	CPI	25,583	29.68	15,421	17.89
170	Bihpur	Rajendra Prasad Sharma	INC	33,137	46.47	Balbhadra Choudhary	BJP	16,449	23.07	16,688	23.40
171	Sultanganj (SC)	Umesh Chandras Das	INC	27,303	38.71	Kampany Pas	LKD	17,625	24.99	9,678	13.72
172	Amarpur	Neel Mohan Singh	INC	58,877	64.01	Dhirendra Prasad Yadav	LKD	13,161	14.31	45,716	49.70
173	Dhuraiya (SC)	Ramroop Harijan	INC	35,351	46.21	Naresh Das	CPI	31,138	40.71	4,213	5.50
174	Banka	Chandra Shekhar Singh	INC	61,743	70.86	Beda Nand Singh	IND	23,426	26.89	38,317	43.97
175	Belhar	Siyaram Rai	INC	33,506	44.68	Chandra Mauleshwar	IND	16,108	21.48	17,398	23.20
176	Katoria	Suresh Prasad Yadav	IC(S)	30,691	39.72	Ambuj Kishore Jha	INC	25,088	32.47	5,603	7.25
177	Chakai	Narendra Singh	INC	53,338	66.81	Falguni Prasad Yadav	BJP	20,210	25.31	33,128	41.50
178	Jhajha	Sheonandan Pd. Yadav	INC	42,943	62.71	Sheonandan Jha	JP	23,051	33.66	19,892	29.05
179	Tarapur	Shakuni Choudhary	IND	42,338	46.50	Vijaya Lakshmi Devi	INC	28,781	31.61	13,557	14.89
180	Kharagpur	Rajendra Pd. Singh	INC	28,738	31.70	Jai Prakash Na. Yadav	LKD	18,018	19.88	10,720	11.82
181	Parbatta	Ram Chandra Mishra	INC	44,944	46.70	Surendra Singh	LKD	37,243	38.70	7,701	8.00
182	Chautham	Kamleshwari Singh	INC	26,025	31.68	Satya N. Singh	CPI	22,737	27.68	3,288	4.00
183	Khagaria	Satdeo Singh	INC	31,078	41.15	Ram Sharan Yadav	LKD	25,681	34.01	5,397	7.14
184	Alauli (SC)	Pashupati Kumar	LKD	37,020	63.92	Vageshwar Paswan	INC	15,321	26.45	21,699	37.47
185	Monghyr	Ramdeo Singh Yadav	LKD	50,272	51.41	Izharul Haque	INC	30,725	31.42	19,547	19.99
186	Jamalpur	Upendra Prasad Verma	LKD	34,987	40.10	Bhushan Yadav	INC	27,966	32.05	7,021	8.05
187	Surajgarha	Alakh Sharma	INC	43,753	43.18	Satis Kumar	CPI	17,592	17.36	26,161	25.82
188	Jamui	Sushil Kr Singh	INC	38,528	40.34	Tripurari Prasad Singh	JP	30,275	31.70	8,253	8.64
189	Sikandra (SC)	Rameshwar Paswan	INC	49,233	54.75	Bhola Manjhi	CPI	36,598	40.70	12,635	14.05
190	Lakhisarai	Krishna Chandra Prasad	JP	49,681	46.55	Ashwimi Kumar Sharma	INC	38,868	36.42	10,813	10.13
191	Sheikhpura	Rajo Singh	IND	77,452	77.41	Rajendra Pd. Singh	INC	21,340	21.33	56,112	56.08
192	Barbigha (SC)	Mahavir Chaudhary	INC	42,991	52.51	Lokhnath Azad	CPI	29,387	35.90	13,604	16.61
193	Asthawan	Raghunath Prasad	IND	36,472	37.44	Ayodhya Prasad	INC	30,687	31.50	5,785	5.94
194	Bihar	Shakil Uzzama	INC	41,939	31.51	Deonath Prasad	BJP	41,562	31.22	377	0.29
195	Rajgir (SC)	Satyadeo Narain Arya	BJP	38,568	46.06	Chandradeo Himanshu	CPI	28,788	34.38	9,780	11.68
196	Nalanda	Shyam Sunder Singh	INC	38,818	47.83	Ram Naresh Singh	IND	33,752	41.59	5,066	6.24
197	Islampur	Ram Swaroop Prasad	INC	54,858	47.80	Krishan Ballabh Pd. Singh	CPI	54,429	47.43	429	0.37
198	Hilsa	Surendra Prasad Tarun	INC	28,406	29.25	Mahendra Singh	IND	20,614	21.23	7,792	8.02
199	Chandi	Anil Kumar	INC	48,258	58.10	Harinarayan Singh	LKD	16,430	19.78	31,828	38.32
200	Harnaut	Nitis Kumar	LKD	49,990	53.42	Virjnandan Prasad Singh	INC	28,578	30.54	21,412	22.88
201	Mokameh	Shyam Sunder Singh	INC	35,929	37.50	Dilip Kumar Singh	IND	33,251	34.70	2,678	2.80
202	Barh	Bhuneshwar Singh	INC	62,421	56.42	Vishwa Mohan Ch.	BJP	41,065	37.12	21,356	19.30
203	Bakhtiarpur	Ram Jaipal Singh	INC	46,571	49.05	Keshari Kishore Singh	BJP	27,162	28.61	19,409	20.44
204	Fatwa (SC)	Punit Roy	LKD	21,480	29.03	Bishambhar Dayal Singh	IND	17,891	24.18	3,589	4.85
205	Masaurhi	Punam Devi	INC	47,163	53.68	Ganesh Prasad Singh	LKD	30,097	34.25	17,066	19.43
206	Patna West	Ram Nandan Prasad	IND	28,062	30.93	Yogeshwar Gope	CPI(M)	17,852	19.68	10,210	11.25
207	Patna Central	Akeel Haider	INC	33,026	47.46	Shailendra Nath Srivastava	BJP	13,425	19.29	19,601	28.17
208	Patna East	Sharat Kumar Jain	INC	25,008	33.90	Ram Lakhan Yadav	CPI	22,241	30.15	2,767	3.75
209	Dinapur	Bijendra Rai	IND	29,757	38.93	Prithvi Raj Sinha	INC	16,949	22.17	12,808	16.76
210	Maner	Rajmati Devi	INC	38,096	50.50	Suryadeo Tyagi	LKD	17,471	23.16	20,625	27.34
211	Phulwari (SC)	Sanjaeev Prasad Ton Tony	INC	59,339	64.23	Dasrath Paswan	CPI	14,890	16.12	44,449	48.11
212	Bikram	Ram Nath Yadav	CPI	29,953	37.39	Ramanand Singh	INC	23,611	29.47	6,342	7.92
213	Paliganj	Ram Lakhan Singh Yadav	INC	55,126	62.47	Kanhai Singh	BJP	23,101	26.18	32,025	36.29
214	Sandesh	Sonadhari	LKD	31,684	36.01	Sidhnath Roy	INC	27,406	31.15	4,278	4.86
215	Barhara	Raghvendra Pratap Singh	JP	40,689	44.10	Vanarshi Devi	INC	27,634	29.95	13,055	14.15
216	Arrah	S. M. Isha	INC	26,959	35.12	Rajendra Pd. Singh	JP	16,364	21.32	10,595	13.80
217	Shahpur	Vindeshwari Dubey	INC	42,766	59.09	Shiva Nand Tiwari	JP	13,086	18.08	29,680	41.01
218	Brahmpur	Rishikesh Tiwary	INC	30,670	35.55	Swami Nath Tiwary	BJP	29,185	33.83	1,485	1.72
219	Buxar	Sri Kant Pathak	INC	19,785	29.76	Vasist Narain	JP	13,975	21.02	5,810	8.74
220	Rajpur (SC)	Ram Narain Ram	BJP	28,032	45.73	Nand Kishore Prasad	LKD	13,273	21.65	14,759	24.08
221	Dumraon	Basant Singh	INC	41,046	52.43	Ram Ashray Singh	CPI	15,798	20.18	25,248	32.25
222	Jagdishpur	Hari Narayan Singh	LKD	17,303	22.88	Mangal Prasad Singh	INC	14,861	19.65	2,442	3.23
223	Piro	Raghu Pati Gope	LKD	14,040	18.09	Radha Mohan Rai	JP	13,941	17.96	99	0.13
224	Sahar (SC)	Jyoti	INC	36,479	55.04	Bhagwati Prasad Verma	LKD	11,890	17.94	24,589	37.10
225	Karakat	Shashi Rani Mishra	INC	40,199	40.84	Tulsi Singh	LKD	26,590	27.02	13,609	13.82
226	Bikramganj	Meghraj Madhavi	LKD	48,406	46.21	Girja Prasad Singh	INC	25,355	24.20	23,051	22.01
227	Dinara	Lakshuman Rai	INC	51,737	49.87	Ram Dhani Singh	LKD	47,520	45.80	4,217	4.07
228	Ramgarh	Jagdanand Singh	LKD	36,165	47.19	Prabhawati Singh	INC	17,581	22.94	18,584	24.25
229	Mohania (SC)	Mahabir Paswan	INC	33,201	45.98	Bhagwat Prasad	JP	19,757	27.36	13,444	18.62
230	Bhabhua	Ram Lal Singh	CPI	30,956	36.08	Shyam Narain Pandey	INC	19,924	23.22	11,032	12.86
231	Chainpur	Parvej Ahsan Khan	INC	16,870	24.34	Lalmuni Chaobey	BJP	14,356	20.71	2,514	3.63
232	Sasaram	Ram Sewak Singh	LKD	15,928	22.06	Jagdish Ojha	INC	13,005	18.01	2,923	4.05
233	Chenari (SC)	Chhedi Paswan	LKD	31,129	38.31	Bans Ropan Ram	INC	28,894	35.56	2,235	2.75
234	Nokha	Sumitra Devi	INC	28,730	34.33	Chaudhary Jangi Singh	LKD	28,308	33.82	422	0.51
235	Dehri	Khalid Anwar Ansari	INC	32,303	41.32	Md. Ilias Hussain	LKD	25,407	32.50	6,896	8.82
236	Nabinagar	Raghubansh Prasad Singh	INC	32,167	45.69	Tulsi Singh	LKD	12,715	18.06	19,452	27.63
237	Deo (SC)	Dilkeshwar Ram	INC	34,679	59.98	Sahdeo Chaudhary	BJP	15,143	26.19	19,536	33.79
238	Aurangabad	Brij Mohan Singh	INC	26,550	44.54	Ram Naresh Singh	IND	22,356	37.50	4,194	7.04
239	Rafiganj	Vijay Kumar Singh	INC	48,670	71.40	Isteyak Ahmad Khan	CPI	13,240	19.42	35,430	51.98
240	Obra	Ram Vilash Singh	LKD	28,786	32.46	Virender Prasad Singh	BJP	20,924	23.59	7,862	8.87
241	Goh	Deo Kumar Sharma	INC	34,455	42.78	Ram Sharan Yadav	CPI	31,388	38.97	3,067	3.81
242	Arwal	Krishna Nandan Prasad	IND	65,621	55.17	Ram Prasad Ojha	INC	30,874	25.96	34,747	29.21
243	Kurtha	Nagmani	IND	34,705	31.30	Sahdeo Prasad Yadav	LKD	18,376	16.57	16,329	14.73
244	Makhdumpur	Ram Jatan Sinha	INC	60,894	49.15	Rajendra Prasad	IND	42,953	34.67	17,941	14.48
245	Jahanabad	Syed Asgar Hussain	INC	45,857	40.40	Hari Lal Prasad Singh	IND	20,465	18.03	25,392	22.37
246	Ghosi	Jagdish Sharma	INC	84,503	66.01	Rajendra Singh	CPI	31,051	24.25	53,452	41.76
247	Belaganj	Abhi Ram Sharma	INC	77,479	68.57	Sheo Bachan Kumar	IND	14,337	12.69	63,142	55.88
248	Konch	Janki Yadav	LKD	29,347	27.04	Raj Kumari Devi	INC	26,669	24.57	2,678	2.47
249	Gaya Mufassil	Awades Kumar Singh	INC	66,013	70.10	Suraj Deo Singh	LKD	25,548	27.13	40,465	42.97
250	Gaya Town	Jai Kumar Palit	INC	34,450	43.40	Shakil Ahmad Khan	CPI	26,180	32.98	8,270	10.42
251	Imamganj (SC)	Sri Chand Singh	INC	37,323	53.15	Jagdish Singh	LKD	28,090	40.00	9,233	13.15
252	Gurua	Md. Khan Ali	INC	36,439	40.98	Ramchandra Singh	LKD	27,668	31.11	8,771	9.87
253	Bodh Gaya (SC)	Rajesh Kumar	LKD	40,227	56.12	Valik Ram	CPI	15,161	21.15	25,066	34.97
254	Barachatti (SC)	G. S. Ramchander Das	INC	44,812	59.35	Ramji Manjhee	LKD	10,032	13.29	34,780	46.06
255	Fatehpur (SC)	Jitan Ram Manjhi	INC	72,167	71.21	Ram Naresh Prasad	IC(S)	27,354	26.99	44,813	44.22
256	Atri	Ranjeet Signh	INC	47,128	34.12	Mahesh Singh Yadav	IND	36,206	26.21	10,922	7.91
257	Nawada	Narendra Kumar	INC	46,992	39.66	M. Krishan Prasad	BJP	44,323	37.41	2,669	2.25
258	Rajauli (SC)	Banwari Ram	IND	24,992	29.53	Babu Lal	BJP	23,911	28.25	1,081	1.28
259	Gobindpur	Gayatree Devi	INC	54,638	57.80	Mahendra Panday	CPI	11,910	12.60	42,728	45.20
260	Warsaliganj	Bandi Shankar Singh	INC	57,659	60.46	Chandeshwar Singh	IND	13,796	14.47	43,863	45.99
261	Hisua	Aditya Singh	IND	29,691	40.38	Lal Narain Singh	CPI	21,941	29.84	7,750	10.54
262	Kodarma	Rajendra Nath Dawan	INC	33,505	46.70	Ramesh Prasad Yadav	IND	28,681	39.98	4,824	6.72
263	Barhi	Niranjan Prasad Singh	INC	12,082	27.02	Ram Lakhan Singh	CPI	11,978	26.79	104	0.23
264	Chatra (SC)	Mahendra Prasad Bhogta	BJP	22,981	47.74	Nand Kishore Prasad	INC	19,014	39.50	3,967	8.24
265	Simaria (SC)	Ishwari Ram Paswan	INC	18,163	43.02	Upendra Nath Das	BJP	12,573	29.78	5,590	13.24
266	Barkagaon	Ramendra Kumar	CPI	31,481	42.00	Ram Kumar Ojha	INC	26,045	34.75	5,436	7.25
267	Ramgarh	Jamuna Prasad Sharma	INC	23,831	33.79	Sabir Ahmed Qureshi	CPI	23,370	33.14	461	0.65
268	Mandu	Tek Lal Mahto	IND	22,545	39.72	Kamla Chand Upadhaya	INC	15,972	28.14	6,573	11.58
269	Hazaribagh	H. H. Rahman	INC	32,878	47.06	Deo Dayal Ram	BJP	18,393	26.32	14,485	20.74
270	Barkatha	Lambodar Pathak	INC	27,609	38.54	Bhuneshwar Mehta	CPI	22,851	31.90	4,758	6.64
271	Dhanwar	Harihar Narayan Prabhakar	BJP	15,464	26.00	Punit Roy	INC	12,696	21.34	2,768	4.66
272	Bagodar	Gautam Sagar Rana	LKD	10,632	19.62	Mayurdhwaja Narayan	INC	10,176	18.78	456	0.84
273	Jamua (SC)	Baldeo Hazra	CPI	37,027	60.79	Taneshwar Azad	INC	18,535	30.43	18,492	30.36
274	Gandey	Salkhan Soren	JMM	19,550	33.62	Lakshman Swarnkar	BJP	15,308	26.32	4,242	7.30
275	Giridih	Om Lal Azad	CPI	19,006	36.79	Urmila Devi	INC	13,310	25.77	5,696	11.02
276	Dumri	Shiva Mahto	IND	21,082	39.37	Lal Chand Mahto	LKD	14,109	26.35	6,973	13.02
277	Gomia	Madhava Lal Singh	IND	23,040	37.48	Ramadhar Singh	INC	16,825	27.37	6,215	10.11
278	Bermo	Rajendra Prasad Singh	INC	30,029	40.63	Shafique Khan	CPI	20,333	27.51	9,696	13.12
279	Bokaro	Samaresh Singh	BJP	35,834	44.80	Aklu Ram Mahto	LKD	17,467	21.84	18,367	22.96
280	Tundi	Satya Narayan Dudani	BJP	11,446	20.38	Udai Kumar Singh	INC	11,422	20.33	24	0.05
281	Baghmara	Om Prakash Lal	INC	30,005	49.82	Raghubansh Singh	JP	9,287	15.42	20,718	34.40
282	Sindri	Vinod Vihari Mahato	IND	22,487	33.39	Mukhtar Ahmad	INC	20,708	30.75	1,779	2.64
283	Nirsa	Kripa Shanker Chatterjee	INC	32,004	50.27	S. K. Bakshi	CPI(M)	16,597	26.07	15,407	24.20
284	Dhanbad	Surendra Prasad Roy	INC	24,780	36.66	Ram Chander Singh	JP	14,059	20.80	10,721	15.86
285	Jharia	Suryadeo Singh	JP	30,607	48.15	Ramesh Prasad Singh	INC	18,052	28.40	12,555	19.75
286	Chandankiyari (SC)	Lata Devi (Mali)	INC	8,659	21.47	Padamlochan Rajwar	BJP	8,231	20.41	428	1.06
287	Baharagora	Devi Pada Upadhyay	CPI	32,238	46.12	Bishnu Pado Ghosh	INC	31,014	44.37	1,224	1.75
288	Ghatsila (ST)	Karan Chandra Mardi	INC	21,954	34.85	Surya Singh Basera	JMM	20,134	31.96	1,820	2.89
289	Potka (ST)	Sonatan Sardar	INC	13,937	32.83	Hari Ram Sardar	JMM	7,930	18.68	6,007	14.15
290	Jugsalai (SC)	Trilochan Kalindi	INC	32,132	57.81	Tulsi Rajak	CPI	15,344	27.60	16,788	30.21
291	Jamshedpur East	Darayus Nariman	INC	31,841	47.49	Dina Nath Pande	BJP	24,043	35.86	7,798	11.63
292	Jamshedpur West	Mrigendra Pratap Singh	BJP	27,702	42.66	Samsuddin Khan	INC	26,246	40.42	1,456	2.24
293	Ichagarh	Prabhat K. A. Deo	INC	28,786	42.81	Nirmal Mahato	JMM	22,552	33.54	6,234	9.27
294	Seraikella (ST)	Krishna Madri	JMM	15,533	32.77	Sanatan Manjhi	INC	14,832	31.29	701	1.48
295	Chaibasa (ST)	Radhey Munda	BJP	14,564	40.53	Muktidani Sumburey	INC	12,906	35.92	1,658	4.61
296	Majhgaon (ST)	Devendra Nath Champia	INC	12,130	35.86	Budhan Singh Tamsoy	IND	4,792	14.17	7,338	21.69
297	Jaganathpur (ST)	Ankura Ho Doreiburu	INC	11,097	38.31	Mangal Singh Lamai	LKD	5,654	19.52	5,443	18.79
298	Manoharpur (ST)	Devendra Manjhi	IND	16,504	37.32	Satrughan Bodra	INC	9,435	21.33	7,069	15.99
299	Chakradharpur (ST)	Jagarnath Bakira	BJP	12,653	30.29	Man Rai Singh Bodra	INC	12,148	29.08	505	1.21
300	Kharasawan (ST)	Vijay Singh Soy	IND	18,182	47.55	Banmali Singh Munda	INC	6,032	15.77	12,150	31.78
301	Tamar (ST)	Tirumuchi Rai Munda	INC	33,722	62.89	Woodhan Lall Munda	CPI(M)	10,500	19.58	23,222	43.31
302	Torpa (ST)	Niral Enem Horo	IND	19,159	44.68	Leyandra Tiru	INC	19,120	44.58	39	0.10
303	Khunti (ST)	Sushila Kerketta	INC	17,282	42.70	Herenj Johan Pahan	IND	11,844	29.27	5,438	13.43
304	Silli	Keshav Mahto Kamlesh	INC	30,189	55.37	Rajendra Singh	CPI(M)	18,378	33.71	11,811	21.66
305	Khijri (ST)	Gomeshri Manki	INC	15,688	39.71	Rati Oraon	BJP	9,946	25.18	5,742	14.53
306	Ranchi	Jai Prakash Gupta	INC	19,309	42.79	Nani Gopal Mitra	BJP	12,872	28.52	6,437	14.27
307	Hatia	Subodh Kant Sahay	JP	19,797	43.81	Subansh Jha	INC	9,018	19.96	10,779	23.85
308	Kanke (SC)	Hari Ram	INC	17,937	45.72	B. D. Ram	CPI	9,386	23.93	8,551	21.79
309	Mandar (ST)	Ganga Bhagat	INC	25,673	50.08	Karam Chand Bhagat	IND	15,870	30.96	9,803	19.12
310	Sisai (ST)	Bandi Oraon	INC	21,822	50.54	Lalit Oraon	BJP	8,434	19.53	13,388	31.01
311	Kolebira (ST)	Birsing Munda	IND	21,839	54.07	Silvia Bage	INC	17,091	42.31	4,748	11.76
312	Simdega (ST)	Nirmal Kumar Besra	BJP	15,248	33.30	Ernest Purty	INC	11,957	26.11	3,291	7.19
313	Gumla (ST)	Bairagi Oraon	INC	14,098	33.41	Jayram Oraon	JP	7,287	17.27	6,811	16.14
314	Bishnupur (ST)	Bhukhala Bhagat	INC	24,438	77.56	Somai Oraon	JP	3,971	12.60	20,467	64.96
315	Lohardaga (ST)	Indra Nath Bhagat	INC	27,847	71.59	Lalu Oraon	BJP	6,086	15.65	21,761	55.94
316	Latehar (SC)	Haridarshan Ram	INC	8,233	35.65	Ramdeo Ram	BJP	6,921	29.97	1,312	5.68
317	Manika (ST)	Yamuna Singh	BJP	21,803	68.06	Rajdeo Oraon	IND	10,234	31.94	11,569	36.12
318	Panki	Sankteshwar Singh	INC	26,783	52.10	Lallu Singh	CPI	6,017	11.70	20,766	40.40
319	Daltonganj	Ishwar Chandra Pandey	INC	22,664	39.42	Inder Singh Namdhari	BJP	18,611	32.37	4,053	7.05
320	Garhwa	Gopi Nath Singh	BJP	13,155	25.21	Yugal Kishore Pandey	INC	12,349	23.67	806	1.54
321	Bhawanathpur	Raj Rajendra Pratap Deo	INC	19,254	33.83	Ram Chandra Keshari	LKD	13,168	23.14	6,086	10.69
322	Bishrampur	Chandrashekhar Dubey	INC	39,144	56.45	Vinod Singh	IND	27,761	40.03	11,383	16.42
323	Chhatarpur (SC)	Radha Krishana Kishor	INC	23,595	60.75	Jorawar Ram	LKD	7,053	18.16	16,542	42.59
324	Hussainabad	Harihar Singh	INC	11,254	20.05	Lachhuman Ram	LKD	8,928	15.91	2,326	4.14
