= Kamleshwari Prasad Yadav =

Indian politician

- Born: 4 January 1902; Chatra, Madhepura, Bihar
- Died: 15 November 1989 (aged 87); Chatra, Madhepura, Bengal Presidency
- Education: Banaras Hindu University, Patna University
- Occupations: Politician, Zamindar, Social Educationist.
- Years active: 1935–1970
- Known for: Member of Constituent Assembly, Member of Legislative Assembly, Founder of K.P. College
- Spouse: Shyama Devi
- Children: 4

Signature
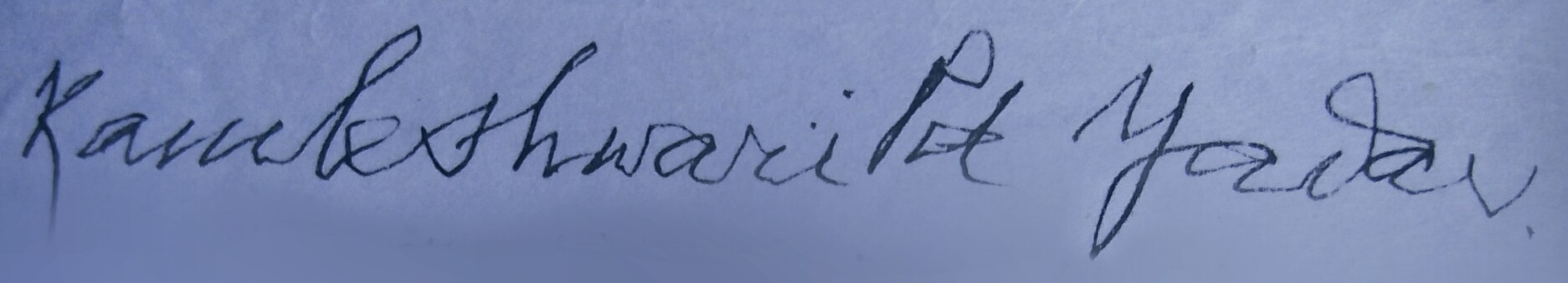

Kamaleshwari Prasad Yadav better known as K.P. Yadav (1902–1989) was the member of the Constituent Assembly of India from 1946 to 1950. He was elected as the member of Bihar Legislative Assembly in 1951 from Kishanganj, Bihar on Indian National Congress ticket.

He was again elected as the member of Bihar Legislative Assembly in 1955 from Kishanganj, Bihar. He was one of the prominent freedom fighters from Bihar. He founded K.P. College in Murliganj, Bihar in 1965 which was later run by his son Abhay Kumar Yadav until they donated it to Government of India in 1980.
