= Kedar Pandey =

12th Chief Minister of Bihar

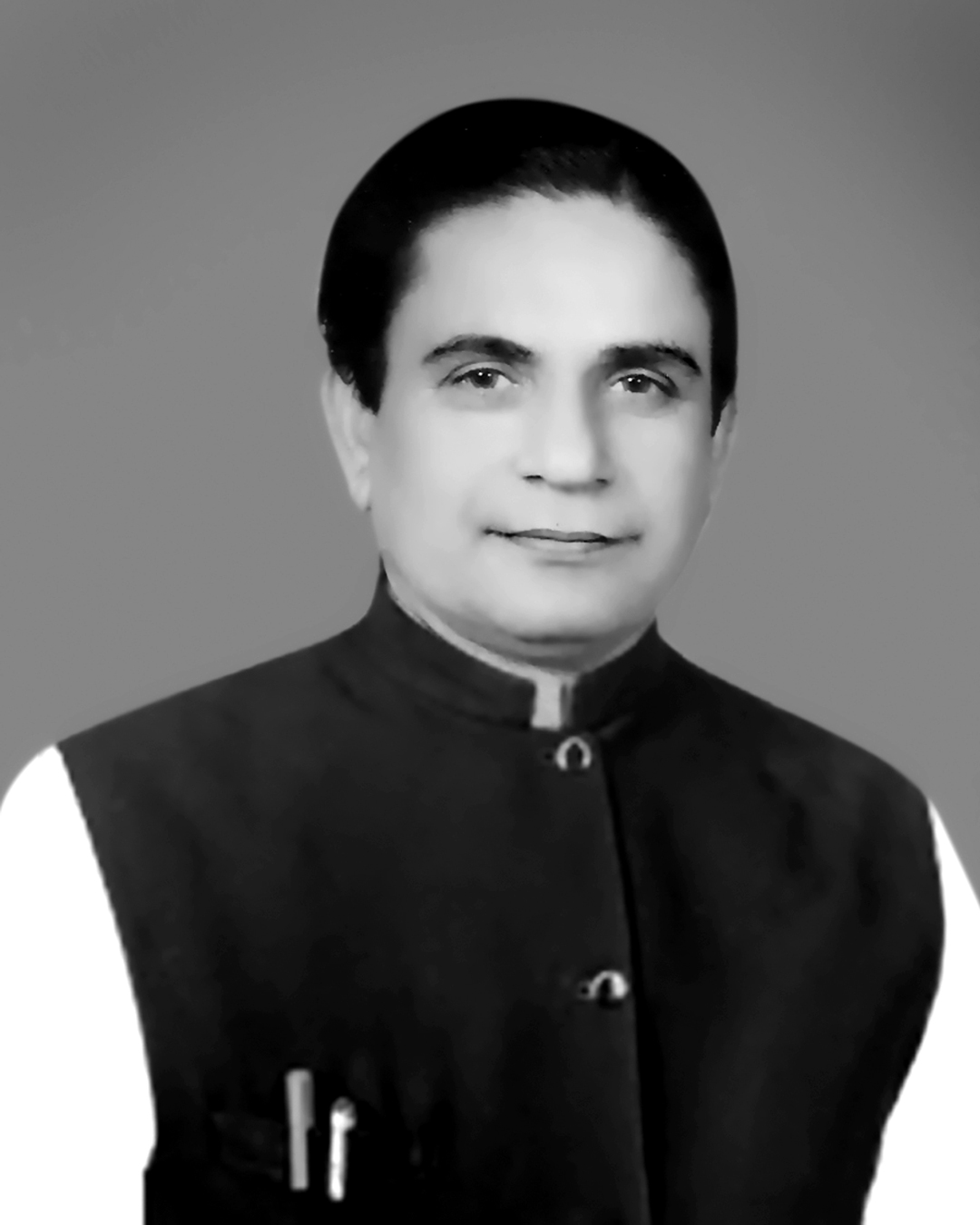

Minister of Rural Development
- In office 12 November 1980 – 14 January 1982
- Prime Minister: Indira Gandhi
- Preceded by: Mohsina Kidwai
- Succeeded by: Buta Singh

Minister of Railways
- In office 12 November 1980 – 14 January 1982
- Prime Minister: Indira Gandhi
- Preceded by: T. A. Pai
- Succeeded by: Prakash Chandra Sethi

Member of Parliament, Lok Sabha
- In office 6 January 1980 – 3 July 1982
- Preceded by: Fazlur Rahman
- Succeeded by: Manoj Pandey
- Constituency: Bettiah

Minister of Health of Bihar
- In office 11 April 1975 – 30 April 1977
- Chief Minister: Abdul Ghafoor
- Preceded by: Abdul Gafoor
- Succeeded by: Bindeshwari Dubey

12th Chief Minister of Bihar
- In office 19 March 1972 – 2 July 1973
- Preceded by: President's rule
- Succeeded by: Abdul Ghafoor

Personal details
- Born: 14 June 1920 Taulaha, Bihar and Orissa Province, British India
- Died: 3 July 1982 (aged 62) New Delhi, India
- Party: Indian National Congress
- Spouse: Kamla Pandey
- Children: 4
- Education: Banaras Hindu University

Kedar Pandey (14 June 1920 – 3 July 1982) was an Indian independence activist and Indian National Congress politician who served as the Chief Minister of Bihar from March 1972 to 2 July 1973 and Minister of Railways in the Union Cabinet from 12 November 1980 to 14 January 1982 in the Government of India.

== Personal life ==
His father's name was the late Pandit Ramphal Panday. He was born at Taulaha Village, West Champaran District on June 14, 1920. His early schooling took place in Paroraha village along with Vikas Mishra. Later on, both were imprisoned during the Indian freedom movement.

He married Smt. Kamla Panday on June 6, 1948. He was the father of two sons, including Dr. Manoj Pandey, and two daughters. He did M.Sc. and LL.B from Banaras Hindu University. By profession, he was an agriculturist as well as a political worker and advocate. He practised in the District Courts of Motihari and Bettiah from 1945 to 1948. He also enrolled as an advocate in the Patna High Court in 1949.

== Independence activism ==
Before independence, Pandey participated in the Indian independence movement in 1942. Pandey was a part of the Young Turks of Bihar Congress during the independence movement along with Bindeshwari Dubey, Bhagwat Jha Azad, Chandrashekhar Singh, Satyendra Narayan Sinha, Abdul Ghafoor all future chief ministers and Sitaram Kesri, future national president of Indian National Congress. He participated in the Trade Union Movement from 1946 to 1957.

== Political career ==
In the first general elections held in 1957, he contested the Bagaha legislative constituency of the Bihar Vidhan Sabha and won. He served as Deputy Minister of Home Affairs, Police, Irrigation & Power among other portfolios from 1957 to 1962. He was again elected to the Bihar Vidhan Sabha in the Nautan constituency, serving from 1967 to 1977 holding ministerial portfolios such as Industry and Agriculture. He was the Health Minister of Bihar from 27 September 1973 to 11 April 1975 in the Abdul Gafoor cabinet.

He was imprisoned for eleven months, courted arrest three times during 1977-79, when Indira Gandhi was arrested. Post-Emergency, he was named Bihar Pradesh Congress Committee President in 1977. He was Vice-Chairman of Bihar Indian National Trade Union Congress. He was Chief Minister of Bihar from March 1972 to 2 July 1973.

In 1980 Congress (I) provided a ticket from Bettiah and he became a member of parliament Lok Sabha. He was Minister of Railways as well as Ministry of Rural Development from 12 November 1980 to 14 January 1982.
