= Abdul Ghafoor (politician, born 1918) =

Indian politician

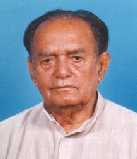

13th Chief Minister of Bihar
- In office 2 July 1973 – 11 April 1975
- Preceded by: Kedar Pandey
- Succeeded by: Jagannath Mishra

Minister for Works and Housing
- In office 31 December 1984 – 25 September 1985
- Prime Minister: Rajiv Gandhi

Minister of Urban Development
- In office 25 September 1985 – 22 October 1986
- Prime Minister: Rajiv Gandhi
- Succeeded by: Mohsina Kidwai

Chairman of Bihar Legislative Council
- In office 5 June 1972 – 1 July 1973

Personal details
- Born: March 18, 1918 Sareya Akhteryar, Bihar and Orissa Province, British India
- Died: 10 July 2004 (aged 85–86) Patna, Bihar, India

Abdul Ghafoor (18 March 1918 – 10 July 2004) was an Indian independence activist and politician who served as the 13th Chief Minister of Bihar from 2 July 1973 to 11 April 1975; and served as cabinet minister in Rajiv Gandhi's government. He participated actively in freedom struggles and served jail terms.

He is also the only Muslim Chief Minister of Bihar since 1947. He was also famous among people as "Chacha Ghafoor".

== Early life and education ==
He was born in a small village of Gopalganj District, Sareya Akhteryar, in a humble farm family on 18th March 1918. Having completed his initial education from the district, he moved to Patna and subsequently to Aligarh for higher education. He completed his MA and Law at Aligarh Muslim University.

Ghafoor was a part of the Young Turks of Bihar Congress during the independence movement along with Bindeshwari Dubey, Bhagwat Jha Azad, Chandrashekhar Singh, Satyendra Narayan Sinha, Kedar Pandey all future chief ministers and Sitaram Kesri, future national president of Indian National Congress.

== Political career ==
Abdul Ghafoor was Chief Minister of Bihar from 2 July 1973 to 11 April 1975. He was also minister for urban development in Rajiv Gandhi Cabinet in 1984. He was elected to Lok Sabha thrice in years 1984, 1991 and 1996 on Congress and Samata Party tickets from Siwan and Gopalganj Parliamentary constituencies respectively. He was also a former chairman of the Bihar Legislative Council. He became member of state legislature for first time in the year 1952.

He died in Patna on 10 July 2004. His political legacy is being carried forward by Asif Ghafoor, his grandson. Asif Ghafoor is member of AICC and general secretary of Bihar Pradesh Congress Committee, contested the 2010 and 2020 Bihar Assembly election from Barauli and Gopalganj constituency in Gopalganj district of Bihar as Indian National Congress nominee.

== See also ==
- List of chief ministers of Bihar
- Abdul Ghafoor

Preceded by Kedar Pandey	Chief Minister of Bihar; 1973–1975	Succeeded by Jagannath Mishra
