= Rafique Alam =

Indian politician

Member of Parliament, Rajya Sabha from Bihar
- In office Apr. 1988 – Apr. 1994
- In office Apr. 1982 – Apr. 1988

Member of the Bihar Legislative Assembly
- In office 1977–1980
- In office 1972–1977
- In office 1969–1972
- Preceded by: Shushila Kapoor
- Succeeded by: Md Mushtaque
- Constituency: Kishanganj
- In office 1962–1967
- Preceded by: Lakhan Lal Kapoor
- Succeeded by: Dilip Narayan Jha
- Constituency: Bahadurganj

Personal details
- Born: 1 June 1929 Kashibari, Purnia (now in Kishanganj) Bihar, India
- Died: 3 April 2011 (aged 81)
- Education: Aligarh Muslim University
- Awards: Indira Gandhi Award for National Integration (1988)

Rafique Alam (1 June 1929 – 3 April 2011), popularly known as Alam Saheb, was an Indian politician who was active in politics for six decades. He was a union minister and a member of the Indian National Congress.

== Early life ==
He was born at Kashibari in Purnea, Bihar on 1 June 1929. Alam had his education at Russel High School, Kishanganj High School, Purnea, and Aligarh Muslim University. An agriculturist, Shri Rafique Alam was associated with several educational institutions in Purnea.

== Career ==
Alam began his legislative career as a Member of the Bihar Legislative Assembly from Bahadurganj Vidhan Sabha in 1962. He was a Member of that Assembly from 1962 to 1967, and again representing Kishanganj Vidhan Sabha from 1969 to 1972, 1972 to 77, and 1977 to 1980.

He served as Cabinet Minister in the Government of Bihar for several terms, holding portfolios of Transport, Local Self-Government, Irrigation, Housing, Jails, Animal Husbandry, Fishery and Wakf, PWD, Rural Reconstruction and Panchayati Raj. Alam represented Bihar in the House from April 1982 to April 1988 and again from April 1988 to April 1994.

Alam served as Pradesh congress President of United Bihar. He served as Deputy Minister in the Ministry of Petroleum and Natural Gas from February to June 1988; as Minister of State in the Ministry of Textiles from 1988 to 1989, and as Minister of State (Independent Charge) in the Ministry of Health and Family Welfare from July to November 1989 in the Union Council of Ministers. He was Chairman of the Committee on Petitions, Rajya Sabha, from 1986 to 1988. Shri Rafique Alam was the Leader of the Indian Haj Goodwill Delegation in 1988.

== Recognition ==
- National Integration Award (1988)

== Death ==
In the death of Shri Rafique Alam, the country has lost an administrator and parliamentarian.
