= Jagannath Mishra =

Indian politician (1937–2019)

14th Chief Minister of Bihar
- In office 6 December 1989 – 10 March 1990
- Governor: Jagannath Pahadia; Gangadhar Ganesh Sohani (acting); Mohammad Yunus Saleem
- Preceded by: Satyendra Narayan Sinha
- Succeeded by: Lalu Prasad Yadav
- In office 8 June 1980 – 14 August 1983
- Governor: Akhlaqur Rahman Kidwai
- Preceded by: President's rule
- Succeeded by: Chandrashekhar Singh
- In office 11 April 1975 – 30 April 1977
- Governor: R. D. Bhandare; Jagannath Kaushal
- Preceded by: Abdul Ghafoor
- Succeeded by: President's rule

Union Minister of Rural Areas and Employment
- In office 11 June 1995 – 16 May 1996
- Prime Minister: P. V. Narasimha Rao
- Preceded by: P. V. Narasimha Rao
- Succeeded by: Atal Bihari Vajpayee

Union Minister of Agriculture
- In office 7 February 1996 – 16 May 1996
- Prime Minister: P. V. Narasimha Rao
- Preceded by: P. V. Narasimha Rao
- Succeeded by: Suraj Bhan

Personal details
- Born: 24 June 1937 Supaul, Bihar, British India
- Died: 19 August 2019 (aged 82) Delhi, India
- Party: Indian National Congress
- Spouse: Veena Mishra
- Education: Babasaheb Bhimrao Ambedkar Bihar University

Jagannath Mishra (24 June 1937 – 19 August 2019) was an Indian politician who served as Chief Minister of Bihar and as Minister in the Union Cabinet. He was also Member of Parliament, Rajya Sabha between 1988 - 1990 and 1994 - 2000. His involvement was at a high level in the Indian National Congress. He was elected Chief Minister of Bihar three times. After his brother L.N. Mishra's assassination, Jagannath Mishra became Bihar's most powerful Congress leader in the late seventies and eighties. Prior to the emergence of Lalu Prasad Yadav in 1990, Jagannath Mishra was rated as the biggest mass leader in the Congress. He was affectionately called "Doctor Sahib".

Mishra supported and practiced populism, and had earned popularity among the teachers by taking over hundreds of private primary, middle and high schools across the state in 1977. After leaving Congress, he joined the Nationalist Congress Party and later the Janata Dal (United). On 30 September 2013, a special Central Bureau of Investigation court in Ranchi convicted him, along with 44 others, in the Fodder Scam. He was sentenced to four years imprisonment and a fine of 200,000 rupees. On 25 October 2013, the Jharkhand High Court granted bail to Mishra in fodder scam case. Mishra maintained his name was deliberately included in the scam on the instruction of the Congress president Sitaram Kesri. Dr. Mishra was acquitted in two fodder scam cases on 23 December 2017 and 19 March 2018. In two cases his Appeal is pending in Jharkhand High Court.

== Early life ==
Jagannath Mishra was born in a Maithili Brahmin family.

== Career ==
Mishra began his career as a lecturer and later became professor of economics at Bihar University, Muzaffarpur. On 23 July 1983, he made a two-hour statement in the Bihar State Assembly in which he criticized the centre. Among the charges he made against the centre were that the state mined 40 per cent of the country's minerals but only got 14 per cent of the royalty earned. He claimed that he had "strongly pleaded with the Centre that the policy should be changed". He added that "the Centre is the buyer of our mineral products. It does not look nice that the consumer should also fix royalty rates. His second charge was that financial institutions were not being fair to the state. Jagannath had stated "I have told the chairman of the Industrial Development Bank of India to invest more in Bihar. I have also told the financial institutions in plain words that for everything we would not go to the Centre". For the Congress(I) high command, the criticism was an uncommon show of independence. Almost immediately Jagannath was summoned to Delhi and resigned on 14 August 1983.

== Politics ==
He first became Chief Minister in 1975 but was brought down due to emergency. He became Chief Minister for the second time in the year 1980 and for third time in the year 1989. He was succeeded by Lalu Prasad Yadav of Janata Dal. He also served as Union Cabinet Minister several times. Using the office of Bihar Chief Minister, Jagannath Mishra established himself as the tallest leader of his time. It was in his second and longest term as Chief Minister that he spoke against the Central Government's mining policy in 1983, including once for two hours in Bihar Assembly criticising the Indira Gandhi Government. His final role as Chief Minister of Bihar came in the wake of an anti-congress sentiment due to Bofors scandal and he was brought in to save the Congress in 1990 Bihar elections. However, by the time elections were held, the Mandal commission report was implemented which created reservations for certain sections of society and new caste based alliances teamed up which were in favour of Janata Dal of VP Singh. Lalu Prasad Yadav replaced Jagannath Mishra as Chief Minister. He finally joined Janata Dal (United) of Nitish Kumar after spending some time in the Nationalist Congress Party.

== Corruption, conviction and anarchism ==
Mishra assumed power after fall of Abdul Ghafoor and he, according to Ashwini Kumar, patronised the Forward Castes in his government with 40% of the ministers in his cabinet hailing from Forward Castes. According to Frankel he cultivated a social coalition of Brahmins, Dalits and Muslims and checked the political ascendancy of the Backwards. In fact, it was Mishra's rule in which crime and politics became inseparable and several contemporary observers note that "politics became a game of personal gains and loss." Although he took populist measures like distribution of surplus land over ceiling laws to Scheduled Castes, his tenure is perceived as highly corrupt and repressive. Mishra also revoked the recommendation of Mungeri Lal commission's report which provided reservation for backward castes. Mishra was also among those convicted of Fodder Scam along with Lalu Prasad Yadav and was subsequently sentenced to 4 years of imprisonment in connection with the case. On 30 September 2013, a special Central Bureau of Investigation (CBI) team investigating the fodder scams found him guilty along with another 44 people, including ex-Chief Minister Lalu Prasad Yadav and was jailed for 4 years and fined Rs 2 lakhs. Later he was absolved of some of the charges and was released on bond.

== Bihar Press Bill ==
On 31 July 1982, Mishra's government successfully pushed through the State Legislative Assembly the amendments of Section 292 of the Indian Penal Code (IPC) and Section 455 of the Criminal Procedure Code (CrPC) collectively called the Bihar Press Bill. Adopted amid pandemonium in the state legislature, the Bihar Press Bill prohibited the publication, sale and possession of any printed matter that was "scurrilous" or "grossly indecent" or "intended for blackmail."

Mishra maintained that while he supported a free press as necessary and vital to a democracy, it must be controlled if one section of it acts irresponsibly. Citing instances of character assassination in the press that would damage the government's credibility, he said that he expected commitment to national goals and aspirations from journalists. Addressing a Congress-I Party meeting in Lucknow, Prime Minister Indira Gandhi said she had not read the Bihar Press Bill but understood from government lawyers that it contains nothing to gag the press. She warned that the government could not allow any segment of society, including the press, to misuse constitutional freedom of expression and that just as the constitution does not allow anyone to commit murder, no reporter could be allowed to engage in character assassination.

In an unprecedented collective challenge to government attempts to curb press freedom, most of India's 10,000 newspapers shut down in protest of the anti-press measure adopted in Bihar and supported by Prime Minister Indira Gandhi. Journalists throughout the country walked out of their newspapers to protest what they regarded as "creeping" state censorship reminiscent of the tough emergency regulations imposed by Gandhi between 1975 and 1977. Exactly one year after the Bihar Assembly passed Jagannath's strict measure, the chief minister moved a motion in the Assembly withdrawing the bill - even as it was waiting for presidential assent. For the first time in the constitutional history of the country a bill awaiting presidential assent had been withdrawn.

In an interview to The Indian Express in 2017, Mishra said he regretted the decision of bringing the bill — which he claims was taken to keep PM Indira Gandhi in good humour "at the peak of her differences with Maneka Gandhi"."I admit that I should not have brought the Bihar Press Bill," Mishra told The Indian Express from Delhi. "I did so to keep then PM Indira Gandhi in good humour. During one of my visits to Delhi, I saw Indira in a pensive mood. She was upset with reports about the differences between her and Maneka Gandhi. She had been getting bad press. She asked me if I can bring a bill on the lines of Tamil Nadu and Orissa and asked me to meet then information and broadcasting minister Vasant Sathe, who gave me a detailed brief. I went back and brought the Bihar Press Bill on 31 July 1982."

== Making Urdu the second official state language ==
On 10 June 1980, during his first cabinet meeting of his second term as Chief Minister of Bihar, Mishra promised to get the state Official Language Act amended to make Urdu the second official language of the State (in addition to Hindi). At the time, Bihar was one of the few states that was contemplating giving Urdu an official status. Only in Jammu and Kashmir, where Urdu is the official medium, and Hyderabad before the army action in 1948 had given the language this kind of recognition.

On 19 September 1980, the state government led by Jagannath Mishra declared that Urdu was the second official language of the state.

== Research and publications ==
He wrote many research papers and also authored and edited a number of books. He was an erudite scholar, an author and an able administrator, and is credited with running of a tight ship during his tenure as Chief Minister of Bihar. He was an accomplished economist and also wrote several books on Bihar's economy.

== Personal life ==
Mishra was a Maithil Brahmin. Mishra's wife Veena died on 22 January 2018 at Delhi's Medanta hospital. She was 72 and was undergoing treatment for respiratory complications. He is survived by three sons and three daughters. His elder brother, Lalit Narayan Mishra, served as the Railway Minister of India between 1973 and 1975 when Indira Gandhi was the Prime Minister. Jagannath Mishra's son, Nitish Mishra, is also a politician and has served as cabinet minister in the Government of Bihar. He was also patron of many social organisations including the Lalit Narayan Mishra Institute of Economic Development & Social Change, Patna. Once in a revenue proceeding pending in the High court of Jharkhand at Ranchi, he had got the Patna Railway station and the Gandhi Maidan mutated in his own name by managing the government staffs as mutation was the subject matter of his case. His opponents had mutated the lands of Jagannath Mishra and had claimed title over the same. Mishra knew that mutation doesn't create title nor it extinguishes title. So he managed the staffs, as his opponents did, and got the railway station and Gandhi Maidan mutated in his own name and asked the Court to give him those properties. In recent months, the case was decided by the High Court. And accepting the assertion of Mr. Mishra, the Court passed the judgement, quoting his aforesaid lines regarding law of mutation.

== Death ==
Mishra died on 19 August 2019 at the age of 82 years, after a prolonged illness in a Delhi hospital. After his death, a three-day state mourning was declared in Bihar. He was cremated with full State honours in Balua Bazar, his ancestral village in Supaul district.

Political offices
Preceded by Abdul Gafoor	Chief Minister of Bihar; 11 April 1975 – 30 April 1977	Succeeded by President's Rule
Preceded by President's Rule	Chief Minister of Bihar; 8 June 1980 – 14 August 1983	Succeeded by Chandrashekhar Singh
Preceded by Satyendra Narayan Sinha	Chief Minister of Bihar; 6 December 1989 – 10 March 1990	Succeeded by Lalu Prasad Yadav
