= Chandrashekhar Singh =

Indian politician

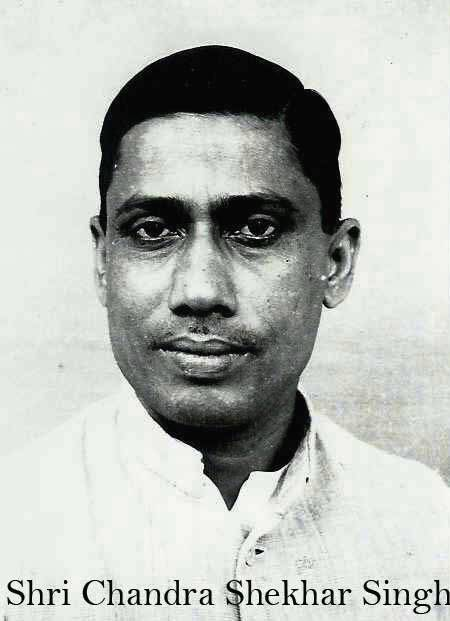
- Chandrashekhar Singh

16th Chief Minister of Bihar
- In office 14 August 1983 – 12 March 1985
- Preceded by: Jagannath Mishra
- Succeeded by: Bindeshwari Dubey

Union Minister of State - Petroleum
- In office 1985 – 9 July 1986
- Prime Minister: Rajiv Gandhi

Personal details
- Born: 17 August 1927 Jamui, Bihar and Orissa Province, British India
- Died: 9 July 1986 (aged 58) New Delhi, India
- Party: Indian National Congress
- Children: 3

Chandrashekhar Singh (17 August 1927 – 9 July 1986) was a member of the Indian National Congress and served as the 16th Chief Minister of Bihar from August 1983 to March 1985. He also held a number of Union State Minister positions in the Ministry of Prime Ministers Indira Gandhi and Rajiv Gandhi. He was elected to Bihar Vidhan Sabha four times, and also to the Parliament a few times. He was also the first minister for Ministry of Textiles.

He last held the position of Union Minister of Petroleum, during which he died due to cancer.

He was elected to the Bihar Vidhan Sabha in 1952, 1957 and 1969 from Jhajha (Vidhan Sabha constituency). He lost from Jhajha (झाझा) in 1962. He was elected to Vidhan Sabha from Chakai (चकाई) in 1972. He was also related to Rajput stalwart Satyendra Narayan Sinha. In 1980, he won the parliamentary elections with an overwhelming majority from Banka (Lok Sabha constituency). In 1983, he was handpicked by Indira Gandhi to become the Chief Minister of Bihar. After the 1985 elections, he was asked by Prime Minister Rajiv Gandhi to return to Government of India as Union Minister of Petroleum. He won a by-poll for Banka Lok Sabha seat in 1985. After his death in 1986, his widow Manorama Singh won the by-poll necessitated by his death. He was elected to the Parliament of India a total of 5 times.

A museum has also been opened in Jamui in Bihar in his name. It was established in 1983 by the state government to preserve the antiquities of the surrounding areas.

== Political career ==
He was a grassroots congressman, being connected to all workers at village level. He also served the Congress party at all levels from village to state level. He got elected to state assembly for first time in year 1952 when he was just 25 years. He got reelected again in the year 1957. After taking break for few years he contested elections and re-entered assembly in year 1969 and remained member till 1977. Though he contested Lok Sabha elections in 1977 as congressman, due to Janata wave he couldn't make it. However he got elected in 1980 defeating Madhu Limaye from Banka seat. He also acted in administrative capacity and became parliament secretary. He was later inducted into cabinet for various ministries such as Revenue, Industry, Minor Irrigation, Law and Public works. In 1983 Cabinet reshuffle he was made Minister of State for Energy.

== Freedom movement ==
Chandrashekhar Singh was a part of the famous Young Turks of Bihar Congress during the independence movement along with Bindeshwari Dubey, Bhagwat Jha Azad, Abdul Gafoor, Satyendra Narayan Sinha, Kedar Pandey all future chief ministers and Sitaram Kesri, future national president of Indian National Congress.

== Personal background ==
He held a postgraduate degree in economics.
