= Chief Minister of Bihar =

Leader of the executive branch of the Government of Bihar

- बिहार के मुख्यमंत्री
- Seal of the State of Bihar

- Flag of India

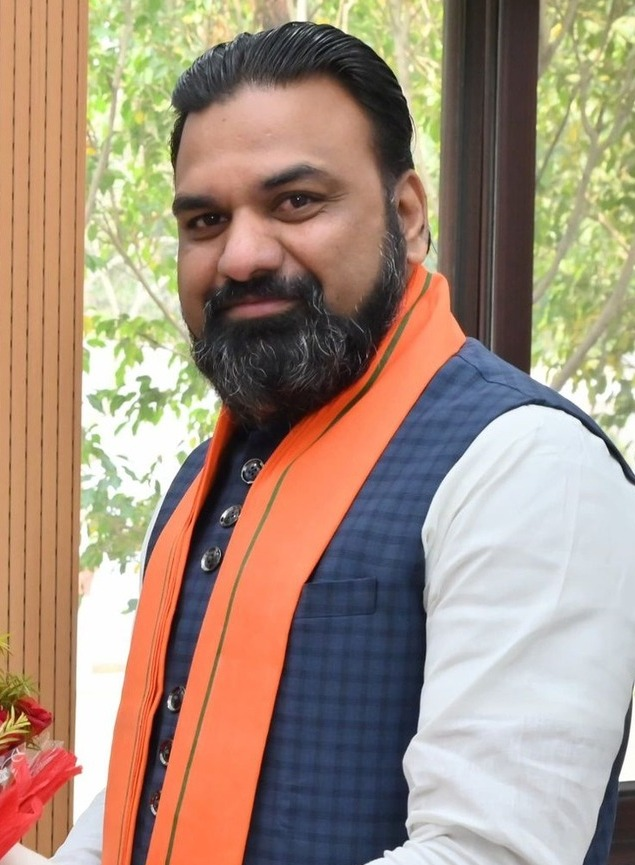
- Incumbent; Samrat Choudhary since 15 April 2026
- Chief Minister's Office; Government of Bihar
- Style: The Honourable (formal); Sir Chief Minister (informal); His Excellency (diplomatic)
- Type: Head of Government
- Status: Leader of the Executive
- Abbreviation: CMoBihar
- Member of: State Cabinet; State Legislature
- Reports to: Governor of Bihar; Bihar Legislature
- Residence: 1, Aney Marg, Patna
- Seat: State Secretariat, Patna
- Nominator: MLAs of the majority party or alliance in the Legislative Assembly
- Appointer: Governor of Bihar; by convention based on appointees ability to command confidence in the Bihar Legislative Assembly
- Term length: At the confidence of the assembly; Chief Minister's term is for five years and is subject to no term limits.
- Precursor: Premier of Bihar
- Inaugural holder: Mohammad Yunus (Indian politician) as Premier; Sri Krishna Sinha as Chief Minister
- Formation: 26 January 1950 (76 years ago)
- Deputy: Deputy Chief Minister of Bihar
- Salary: ₹215,000 (US$2,300)/monthly; ₹2,580,000 (US$28,000)/annually
- Website: Official website

The Chief Minister of Bihar is the de facto head of the executive branch of the Government of Bihar, of the Indian state of Bihar. The chief minister of Bihar overseeing its administration and governance within the constitutional framework of India.

While the Governor of Bihar holds the ceremonial role of the constitutional head, real executive authority rests with the chief minister, who is responsible for implementing policies and managing the state's day-to-day affairs. Appointed by the Governor following elections to the Bihar Legislative Assembly, the chief minister is typically the leader of the majority party or coalition in the assembly. Upon taking office, they form a council of ministers, assigning portfolios to manage various government departments. This council operates collectively under the chief minister's leadership and remains accountable to the legislative assembly. Responsibilities of the office include leading cabinet meetings, drafting and implementing state policies, and presenting the annual budget. In addition to maintaining law and order, the chief minister directs efforts toward economic development, public welfare, and infrastructure improvement. Coordination with the Government of India and advocacy for Bihar's interests at the national level are also integral parts of the role. Chief Minister also serves as Leader of the House in the Legislative Assembly.

Policy proposals and legislative initiatives are often introduced under the chief minister's guidance, shaping the government's agenda in the assembly. Administrative oversight is another key function, ensuring government departments and officials deliver public services efficiently and in line with policy objectives. The position carries a five-year term, concurrent with the tenure of the legislative assembly. However, tenure depends on retaining the confidence of the assembly, as the chief minister can be removed through a vote of no confidence. There are no term limits, allowing for multiple consecutive or non-consecutive terms. Since its establishment in 1946, the office has grown in influence, reflecting shifts in state politics and governance. The role has become central to Bihar's administration, with successive holders contributing to the state's legislative, economic, and social development efforts.

From 1946, 23 people have been chief minister of Bihar. The current holder of the position is Samrat Chaudhary, who succeeded the longest-serving Nitish Kumar from 22 February 2015 to 14 April 2026. Kumar vacated the Chief Minister's Office due to his election as an MP in the upper chamber of the union Parliament, the Rajya Sabha.

== Oath as the state chief minister ==
The chief minister serves five years in the office. The following is the oath of the chief minister of state:

I, <name of Chief Minister>, do swear in the name of God/solemnly affirm that I will bear true faith and allegiance to the Constitution of India as by law established, that I will uphold the sovereignty and integrity of India, that I will faithfully and conscientiously discharge my duties as a Minister for the State of Bihar and that I will do right to all manner of people in accordance with the Constitution and the law without fear or favour, affection or ill-will.

== Premiers of Bihar Province (1937–1947) ==
Before independence, Bihar was part of the larger Bihar and Orissa province, which was divided into two separate provinces on 1 April 1936. The Government of India Act 1935 introduced a bicameral legislature in Bihar, with a Legislative Assembly and a Legislative Council, headed by the Premier. Shri Krishna Sinha became the first Premier in 1937, leading a government formed by the Indian National Congress. He continued as Bihar's leader after independence, becoming the first chief minister in 1946. The role of premier was replaced by the chief minister after India's independence in 1947, with Bihar's political leadership transitioning to a new democratic framework.

#	Portrait	Name	Term of office			Party
#	Portrait	Name	Took office	Left office	Tenure	Party
1		Mohammad Yunus	1 April 1937	19 July 1937	109 days	Muslim Independent Party
2		Shri Krishna Sinha	20 July 1937	31 October 1939	2 years, 103 days	Indian National Congress
Vacant
(2)		Shri Krishna Sinha	23 March 1946	14 August 1947	1 year, 144 days	Indian National Congress

=== Key ===
- No.: Incumbent number
- ^{§} Assassinated or died in office
- ^{RES} Resigned
- ^{NC} Resigned following a no-confidence motion

#	Portrait	Name	Constituency	Term of office			Assembly (Election)	Party (Note: This column only names the chief minister's party. The state government he heads may be a complex coalition of several parties and independents; these are not listed here.)
1		Shri Krishna Sinha	Kharagpur	15 August 1947	29 April 1952	13 years, 169 days	Provincial (1946 election)	Indian National Congress
1		Shri Krishna Sinha	Kharagpur	29 April 1952	5 May 1957	13 years, 169 days	1st (1952 election)	Indian National Congress
1		Shri Krishna Sinha	Sheikhpura	5 May 1957	31 January 1961^{[†]}	13 years, 169 days	2nd (1957 election)	Indian National Congress
2		Deep Narayan Singh	Hajipur	1 February 1961	18 February 1961	17 days	2nd (1957 election)	Indian National Congress
3		Binodanand Jha	Rajmahal	18 February 1961	15 March 1962	2 years, 226 days	2nd (1957 election)	Indian National Congress
3		Binodanand Jha	Rajmahal	15 March 1962	2 October 1963	2 years, 226 days	3rd (1962 election)	Indian National Congress
4		Krishna Ballabh Sahay	Patna West	2 October 1963	5 March 1967	3 years, 154 days	3rd (1962 election)	Indian National Congress
5		Mahamaya Prasad Sinha	Patna West	5 March 1967	28 January 1968	329 days	4th (1967 election)	Jana Kranti Dal
6		Satish Prasad Singh	Parbatta	28 January 1968	1 February 1968	4 days	4th (1967 election)	Shoshit Dal
7		B. P. Mandal	MLC	1 February 1968	22 March 1968	50 days	4th (1967 election)	Shoshit Dal
8		Bhola Paswan Shastri	Korha	22 March 1968	29 June 1968	99 days	4th (1967 election)	Loktantrik Congress
–	State Emblem of India	Vacant (Note: President's rule may be imposed when the "government in a state is not able to function as per the Constitution", which often happens because no party or coalition has a majority in the assembly. When President's rule is in force in a state, its council of ministers stands dissolved. The office of chief minister thus lies vacant, and the administration is taken over by the governor, who functions on behalf of the central government. At times, the legislative assembly also stands dissolved.) (President's rule)	N/A	29 June 1968	26 February 1969	242 days	Dissolved	N/A
9		Harihar Singh	Nayagram	26 February 1969	22 June 1969	116 days	5th (1969 election)	Indian National Congress
(8)		Bhola Paswan Shastri	Korha	22 June 1969	4 July 1969	12 days	5th (1969 election)	Loktantrik Congress
–	State Emblem of India	Vacant	N/A	4 July 1969	16 February 1970	227 days	5th (1969 election)	N/A
10		Daroga Prasad Rai	Parsa	16 February 1970	22 December 1970	309 days	5th (1969 election)	Indian National Congress (R)
11		Karpoori Thakur	Tajpur	22 December 1970	2 June 1971	162 days	5th (1969 election)	Samyukta Socialist Party
(8)		Bhola Paswan Shastri	Korha	2 June 1971	9 January 1972	221 days	5th (1969 election)	Loktantrik Congress
–	State Emblem of India	Vacant	N/A	9 January 1972	19 March 1972	70 days	Dissolved	N/A
12		Kedar Pandey	Nautan	19 March 1972	2 July 1973	1 year, 105 days	6th (1972 election)	Indian National Congress
13		Abdul Ghafoor	MLC	2 July 1973	11 April 1975	1 year, 283 days	6th (1972 election)	Indian National Congress
14		Jagannath Mishra	Jhanjharpur	11 April 1975	30 April 1977	2 years, 19 days	6th (1972 election)	Indian National Congress
–	State Emblem of India	Vacant	N/A	30 April 1977	24 June 1977	55 days	Dissolved	N/A
(11)		Karpoori Thakur	Phulparas	24 June 1977	21 April 1979	1 year, 301 days	7th (1977 election)	Janata Party
15		Ram Sundar Das	Sonepur	21 April 1979	17 February 1980	302 days	7th (1977 election)	Janata Party
–	State Emblem of India	Vacant	N/A	17 February 1980	8 June 1980	112 days		N/A
(14)		Jagannath Mishra	Jhanjharpur	8 June 1980	14 August 1983	3 years, 67 days	8th (1980 election)	Indian National Congress
16		Chandrashekhar Singh	MLC	14 August 1983	12 March 1985	1 year, 210 days	8th (1980 election)	Indian National Congress
17		Bindeshwari Dubey	Shahpur	12 March 1985	14 February 1988	2 years, 339 days	9th (1985 election)	Indian National Congress
18		Bhagwat Jha Azad	MLC	14 February 1988	11 March 1989	1 year, 25 days	9th (1985 election)	Indian National Congress
19		Satyendra Narayan Sinha	MLC	11 March 1989	6 December 1989	270 days	9th (1985 election)	Indian National Congress
(14)		Jagannath Mishra	Jhanjharpur	6 December 1989	10 March 1990	94 days	9th (1985 election)	Indian National Congress
20		Lalu Prasad Yadav	MLC	10 March 1990	28 March 1995	5 years, 18 days	10th (1990 election)	Janata Dal
–	State Emblem of India	Vacant	N/A	28 March 1995	4 April 1995	7 days	Dissolved	N/A
(20)		Lalu Prasad Yadav	Raghopur	4 April 1995	25 July 1997	2 years, 112 days	11th (1995 election)	Janata Dal
(20)		Lalu Prasad Yadav	Raghopur	4 April 1995	25 July 1997	2 years, 112 days	11th (1995 election)	Rashtriya Janata Dal
21		Rabri Devi	MLC	25 July 1997	11 February 1999	1 year, 201 days	11th (1995 election)	Rashtriya Janata Dal
–	State Emblem of India	Vacant)	N/A	11 February 1999	9 March 1999	26 days	11th (1995 election)	N/A
(21)		Rabri Devi	MLC	9 March 1999	3 March 2000	360 days	11th (1995 election)	Rashtriya Janata Dal
22		Nitish Kumar	MLC	3 March 2000	11 March 2000	8 days	12th (2000 election)	Samata Party
(21)		Rabri Devi (Note: On 15 November 2000, the new state of Jharkhand was carved out of Bihar.)	Raghopur	11 March 2000	7 March 2005	4 years, 361 days	12th (2000 election)	Rashtriya Janata Dal
–	State Emblem of India	Vacant	N/A	7 March 2005	24 November 2005	262 days	13th (Feb 2005 election)	N/A
(22)		Nitish Kumar	MLC	24 November 2005	26 November 2010	8 years, 177 days	14th (Oct 2005 election)	Janata Dal (United)
(22)		Nitish Kumar	MLC	26 November 2010	20 May 2014	8 years, 177 days	15th (2010 election)	Janata Dal (United)
23		Jitan Ram Manjhi	Makhdumpur	20 May 2014	22 February 2015	278 days	15th (2010 election)	Janata Dal (United)
(22)		Nitish Kumar	MLC	22 February 2015	20 November 2015	11 years, 52 days	15th (2010 election)	Janata Dal (United)
(22)		Nitish Kumar	MLC	20 November 2015	16 November 2020	11 years, 52 days	16th (2015 election)	Janata Dal (United)
(22)		Nitish Kumar	MLC	16 November 2020	20 November 2025	11 years, 52 days	17th (2020 election)	Janata Dal (United)
(22)		Nitish Kumar	MLC	20 November 2025	15 April 2026	11 years, 52 days	18th (2025 election)	Janata Dal (United)
24		Samrat Choudhary	Tarapur	15 April 2026	Incumbent	213 days	18th (2025 election)	Bharatiya Janata Party

== Statistics ==
#	Name	Party	Length of term	
#	Name	Party	Longest tenure	Total tenure
1	Nitish Kumar	JD(U)	11 years, 52 days	19 years, 237 days
2	Shri Krishna Sinha	INC	13 years, 169 days	17 years, 51 days
3	Rabri Devi	RJD	4 years, 361 days	7 year, 192 days
4	Lalu Prasad Yadav	JD	5 years, 18 days	7 years, 130 days
5	Jagannath Mishra	INC	3 years, 67 days	5 years, 180 days
6	Krishna Ballabh Sahay	INC	3 years, 154 days	3 years, 154 days
7	Bindeshwari Dubey	INC	2 years, 339 days	2 years, 339 days
8	Binodanand Jha	INC	2 years, 226 days	2 years, 226 days
9	Karpoori Thakur	JP	1 year, 301 days	2 years, 98 days
10	Abdul Ghafoor	INC	1 year, 283 days	1 year, 283 days
11	Chandrashekhar Singh	INC	1 year, 210 days	1 year, 210 days
12	Kedar Pandey	INC	1 year, 105 days	1 year, 105 days
13	Bhagwat Jha Azad	INC	1 year, 25 days	1 year, 25 days
14	Bhola Paswan Shastri	INC	221 days	332 days
15	Mahamaya Prasad Sinha	JKD	329 days	329 days
16	Daroga Prasad Rai	INC	309 days	309 days
17	Ram Sundar Das	JP	302 days	302 days
18	Jitan Ram Manjhi	JD(U)	278 days	278 days
19	Satyendra Narayan Sinha	INC	270 days	270 days
20	Samrat Choudhary	BJP	213 days	213 days
21	Harihar Singh	INC	116 days	116 days
22	B. P. Mandal	SSP	50 days	50 days
23	Deep Narayan Singh	INC	17 days	17 days
24	Satish Prasad Singh	SSP	4 days	4 days

Fraction of time of holding CMO by party (as of August 9, 2026)
1. Indian National Congress (46.2%)
2. Janata Dal (United) (25.8%)
3. Rashtriya Janata Dal (9.53%)
4. Janata Dal (9.31%)
5. President's Rule (3.47%)
6. Janata Party (3.35%)
7. Jana Kranti Dal (1.14%)
8. Socialist Party (0.56%)
9. Bharatiya Janata Party (0.40%)
10. Shoshit Dal (0.19%)
11. Samta Party (0.02%)

== See also ==
- Bihar
- List of governors of Bihar
- List of deputy chief ministers of Bihar
