= Bhagwat Jha Azad =

Indian independence activist and politician

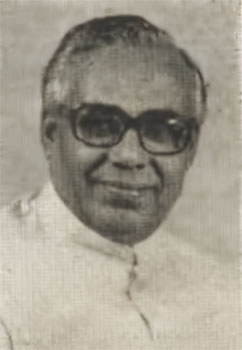

18th Chief Minister of Bihar
- In office 14 February 1988 – 10 March 1989
- Preceded by: Bindeshwari Dubey
- Succeeded by: Satyendra Narayan Sinha

Member of Parliament, Lok Sabha
- In office 18 January 1980 – 27 November 1989
- Preceded by: Ramjee Singh
- Succeeded by: Chunchun Prasad Yadav
- Constituency: Bhagalpur
- In office 2 April 1962 – 18 January 1977
- Preceded by: Banarsi Prasad Jhunjhunwala
- Succeeded by: Ramjee Singh
- Constituency: Bhagalpur

Personal details
- Born: 28 November 1922 Godda, Bihar and Orissa Province, British India
- Died: 4 October 2011 (aged 88) Bhagalpur, Bihar, India
- Children: Kirti Azad (son)

Bhagwat Jha Azad (28 November 1922 – 4 October 2010) was an Indian independence activist and politician who was Chief Minister of Bihar from 14 February 1988 to 10 March 1989. He was at various times a member of parliament and a member of the Bihar state legislature.

== Political career ==
Azad was a 20-year-old college student when he took part in a demonstration as part of the Quit India Movement in 1942. He was hit by a bullet in his leg. Later, Azad was also arrested several times by the British.

Independence came in 1947, exactly five years after the Quit India Movement, and Azad was advantageously poised to make a career in politics. He was part of an influential cohort of politicians from Bihar who gained prominence on the national stage during the post-independence stage, known as the "Young Turks." He was a contemporary of Bindeshwari Dubey, Abdul Gafoor, Chandrashekhar Singh, Satyendra Narayan Sinha and Kedar Pandey (all future chief ministers of Bihar); and of Sitaram Kesri, future national president of Indian National Congress.

Azad represented Bhagalpur constituency in the Lok Sabha for five terms. He was elected to the third, fourth, fifth, seventh and eighth Lok Sabha. He served as a Union minister of state from 1967 to 1983 in the ministries of agriculture, education, labour and employment, supply and rehabilitation, civil aviation and food and civil supplies. He was a veteran Congressman, and Chief Minister of Bihar between 14 February 1988 and 10 March 1989.

Cricketer Kirti Azad and former Indian Policy Service officer Yashovardhan Azad are his sons.

Bhagwat Jha Azad died in 2011 aged 89. He had been ailing for several years.
