= 1962 Bihar Legislative Assembly election =

State assembly election in India

- 19 February 1962

All 318 seats in the Bihar Legislative Assembly 159 seats needed for a majority
- Registered: 22,115,041
- Turnout: 44.47%

	Majority party	Minority party
Leader	Binodanand Jha
Party	INC	SWA
Seats before	210	New
Seats won	185	50
Seat change	▼25	New
CM before election
Binodanand Jha
INC
Elected CM
Binodanand Jha
INC

This is a list of the results of the 1962 general election to the Legislative Assembly of Bihar, a state in India, including a list of successful candidates. After the elections, the Congress emerged as the largest party, and Pandit Binodanand Jha was sworn in as the Chief Minister of Bihar. Satyendra Narayan Sinha was designated as his second-in-command with the educational portfolio.

== General statistics ==
Total Seats	318
SC Seats	40
ST Seats	32
Total electors	22,115,041
Votes Polled	9,833,810
Percentage	44.47%
Valid Votes	4,810,164
Total Candidates	1,529
Male Candidates	1,483
Female Candidates	46
Polling Stations	24,215

== Results ==
Party	Votes	%	Seats
Swatantra Party	1,700,524	17.25	50
Socialist Party of India	515,263	5.23	7
Praja Socialist Party	1,396,952	14.17	29
Jan Sangh	273,355	2.77	3
Indian National Congress	4,075,844	41.35	185
Communist Party of India	613,955	6.23	12
Ram Rajya Parishad	18,174	0.18	–
Jharkhand Party	432,643	4.39	20
Hindu Mahasabha	2,614	0.03	–
Independent	827,841	8.40	12
Total	9,857,165	100.00	318
Valid votes	9,857,165	79.11	
Invalid/blank votes	2,602,913	20.89	
Total votes	12,460,078	100.00	
Registered voters/turnout	22,115,041	56.34	
Source: ECI

== List of successful candidates ==
No.	Constituency	Reservation	Candidate	Party
1	Dhanaha	None	Ranglal Prasad	Indian National Congress
2	Bagaha	SC	Narsingh Baitha	Indian National Congress
3	Ramnagar	None	Narain Bikram Shah Alias Narain Raja	Swatantra Party
4	Shikarpur	None	Umesh Prasad Verma	Indian National Congress
5	Sikta	None	Raiful Azam	Swatantra Party
6	Lauria	None	Subh Narain Prasad	Indian National Congress
7	Chanpatia	None	Pramod Kumar Mishra	Indian National Congress
8	Bettiah	None	Jay Narayan Prasad	Indian National Congress
9	Manjhaulia	SC	Jildar Ram	Swatantra Party
10	Raxaul	None	Radha Pande	Indian National Congress
11	Adapur	None	Rambaran Prasad	Praja Socialist Party
12	Ghorasahan	None	Rajendra Pratap Singh	Indian National Congress
13	Dhaka	None	Nek Mahamad	Communist Party of India
14	Patahi	None	Bibhishan Kumar	Indian National Congress
15	Madhuban	None	Mangal Prasad Yadav	Indian National Congress
16	Kesaria	None	Pitambar Singh	Communist Party of India
17	Pipra	None	Satyadeo Prasad Chaudhari	Indian National Congress
18	Motihari	None	Shakuntla Devi	Indian National Congress
19	Sugauli	SC	Bidya Kishore Bidyalankar	Indian National Congress
20	Harsidhi	None	Nageshwar Dutt Pathak	Indian National Congress
21	Gobindganj	None	Dhrup Narain Mani Tripathi	Indian National Congress
22	Barauli	None	Gorakh Rai	Indian National Congress
23	Gopalganj	None	Abdul Ghafoor	Indian National Congress
24	Kuchaikot	None	Sheokumar Pathak	Indian National Congress
25	Katea	SC	Badari Mahara	Swatantra Party
26	Bhore	None	Raj Mangal Mishra	Indian National Congress
27	Mirganj	None	Prabhunath Tiwari	Praja Socialist Party
28	Siwan	None	Janardan Tiwari	Jan Sangh
29	Ziradei	None	Raja Ram Choudhary	Swatantra Party
30	Mairwa	SC	Ram Basawan Ram	Indian National Congress
31	Darauli	None	Ramayan Shukla	Indian National Congress
32	Raghunathpur	None	Ramanand Yadav	Indian National Congress
33	Manjhi	None	Girish Tiwary	Indian National Congress
34	Maharajganj	None	Umashankar Prasad	Swatantra Party
35	Basantpur West	None	Jhulan Singh	Indian National Congress
36	Basantpur East	None	Sabhapati Singh	Praja Socialist Party
37	Barharia	None	Ram Raj Singh	Praja Socialist Party
38	Baikunthpur	None	Sheobachan Trivedi	Indian National Congress
39	Mashrakh North	None	Prabhu Nath Singh	Indian National Congress
40	Mashrakh South	None	Raj Kumari Devi	Indian National Congress
41	Marhaura	None	Suraj Singh	Indian National Congress
42	Baniapur	None	Uma Pandey	Indian National Congress
43	Chapra Muffasil	SC	Jag Lall Choudhari	Indian National Congress
44	Chapra	None	Sundri Devi	Indian National Congress
45	Garkha	None	Sheo Shanker Prasad Singh	Indian National Congress
46	Parsa	None	Daroga Prasad Rai	Indian National Congress
47	Sonepur	None	Sheo Bachan Singh	Communist Party of India
48	Hajipur	None	Dipnarain Sinha	Indian National Congress
49	Raghopur	None	Devendra Sinha	Socialist Party
50	Mahnar	None	Munishwar Prasad Sinha	Praja Socialist Party
51	Jandaha	None	Tulsi Dass Mehta	Socialist Party
52	Patepur	None	Kamlesh Rai	Praja Socialist Party
53	Mahua	SC	Mira Devi	Indian National Congress
54	Lalganj South	None	Birchandra Patel	Indian National Congress
55	Lalganj North	None	Bateshwar Prasad	Independent politician
56	Paru	SC	Chandu Ram	Indian National Congress
57	Sahibganj	None	Nawal Kishore Singh	Indian National Congress
58	Baruraj	None	Ramchandra Pd. Sahi	Indian National Congress
59	Kanti	None	Yamuna Prasad Tripathy	Indian National Congress
60	Kurhani	SC	Ramgulam Choudhary	Indian National Congress
61	Sakra	None	Mahesh Prasad Singh	Indian National Congress
62	Muzaffarpur	None	Devanandan Sahaya	Indian National Congress
63	Muzaffarpur	None	Muffasil Chandra Madhav Singh	Indian National Congress
64	Katra South	None	Nitishwar Prasad Singh	Indian National Congress
65	Katra North	None	Pandav Rai	Independent politician
66	Minapur	None	Janak Singh	Indian National Congress
67	Runisaidpur	None	Viveka Nand Giri	Independent politician
68	Belsand	None	Ramanand Singh	Praja Socialist Party
69	Sheohar	None	Chitaranjan Singh	Indian National Congress
70	Majorganj	SC	Ram Swatantra Partyroop Ram	Indian National Congress
71	Sitamarhi South	None	Kishori Lal Sah	Indian National Congress
72	Sitamarhi North	None	Girja Devi	Indian National Congress
73	Sonbarsa	None	Sitaram Mahto	Independent politician
74	Sursand	None	Pratibha Devi	Indian National Congress
75	Pupri North	None	Bhuneshwar Rai	Praja Socialist Party
76	Pupri South	None	Davendra Jha	Praja Socialist Party
77	Jale	None	Ek Narayan Choudhary	Indian National Congress
78	Benipatti West	None	Tej Narain Jha	Communist Party of India
79	Benipatti East	None	Rajkumar Purbey	Communist Party of India
80	Harlakhi	None	Baidyanath Yadav	Communist Party of India
81	Jainagar	SC	Ramkrishna Mahto	Indian National Congress
82	Khajauli	None	Sakoor Ahmad	Indian National Congress
83	Madhubani West	None	Safiqullah Ansari	Indian National Congress
84	Madhubani East	None	Suraj Narain Singh	Praja Socialist Party
85	Jhanjharpur	None	Harishchandra Jha	Indian National Congress
86	Laukaha	None	Deonarain Gurmaita	Praja Socialist Party
87	Phulparas	None	Rasik Lal Yadav	Indian National Congress
88	Madhaipur	None	Premchand Mishra	Indian National Congress
89	Biraul	None	Chandrashekhar Jha	Swatantra Party
90	Bahera East	None	Maheshkant Sharma	Indian National Congress
91	Bahera West	None	Harinath Mishra	Indian National Congress
92	Bahera South	None	Krishna Devi	Indian National Congress
93	Darbhanga	None	Central Rameshwar Prasad Sinha	Indian National Congress
94	Darbhanga North	None	Sayeedul Haque Shaikh	Indian National Congress
95	Darbhanga West	SC	Shyam Kumari	Indian National Congress
96	Darbhanga East	None	Ramsewak Thakur	Indian National Congress
97	Warisnagar West	None	Ramsukumari Devi	Indian National Congress
98	Warisnagar East	None	Basistha Narain Singh	Praja Socialist Party
99	Samastipur East	None	Sahdeo Mahto	Indian National Congress
100	Samastipur West	None	Tej Narain Ishwar	Indian National Congress
101	TaJharkhand Partyur	None	Karpoori Thakur	Praja Socialist Party
102	Mohiuddinnagar	None	Shanti Devi	Indian National Congress
103	Dalsingh Sarai West	SC	Baleshwar Ram	Indian National Congress
104	Dalsingh Sarai East	None	Mishri Singh	Indian National Congress
105	Rosera	None	Ramakant Jha	Praja Socialist Party
106	Rosera East	None	Mahabir Raut	Indian National Congress
107	Singhia	SC	Babue Lal Mahto	Indian National Congress
108	Supaul	None	Parmeshwar Kumar	Praja Socialist Party
109	Kishanpur	None	Baidyanath Mehta	Indian National Congress
110	Raghopur	None	Rajendra Mishra	Indian National Congress
111	Tribeniganj	None	Khub Lal Mahto	Indian National Congress
112	SingheSwatantra Partyrsthan	SC	Ramji Mushar	Socialist Party
113	Murliganj	None	Jai Kumar Singh	Socialist Party
114	Madhipura	None	Bindheyshwari Pd. Mandal	Indian National Congress
115	Saharsa	None	Ramesh Jha	Praja Socialist Party
116	Sonbarsa	None	Suresh Chandra Yadav	Swatantra Party
117	Kishanganj	SC	Yashoda Devi	Indian National Congress
118	Alamnagar	None	Yadunandan Jha	Indian National Congress
119	Rupauli	None	Brij Behari Singh	Indian National Congress
120	Dhamdaha	None	Lakshmi Narain Sudhanshu	Indian National Congress
121	Banmankhi	SC	Bhola PaSwatantra Partyn	Indian National Congress
122	Raniganj	None	Ganesh Lall Verma	Independent politician
123	Narpatganj	SC	Dumar Lal Baitha	Indian National Congress
124	Forbesganj	None	Saryu Mishra	Praja Socialist Party
125	Araria	None	Balkrishna Jha	Independent politician
126	Palasi	None	Azimuddin Mohammad	Swatantra Party
127	Bahadurganj	None	Rafuque Alam	Indian National Congress
128	Kishanganj	None	Mohammad Hussain Azad	Swatantra Party
129	Amaur	None	Mohammad Alijan	Indian National Congress
130	Purnea	None	Kamaldeo Narain Sinha	Indian National Congress
131	Baisi	None	Haseebur Rahman	Praja Socialist Party
132	Kadwa	None	Kamal Nath Jha	Indian National Congress
133	Azamnagar	ST	Nandlal Marandi	Praja Socialist Party
134	Katihar	None	Sukdeo Narain Singh	Indian National Congress
135	Barari	None	Basudeo Prasad Singh	Indian National Congress
136	Manihari	None	Jubraj	Praja Socialist Party
137	Rajmahal	None	Binodanand Jha	Indian National Congress
138	Borio	ST	Singrai Murmu	Jharkhand Party
139	Barhait	ST	Babulal Tudu	Jharkhand Party
140	Littipara	ST	Ram Charan Kisku	Jharkhand Party
141	Pakaur	None	Prasunandu Chandra Pandey	Jharkhand Party
142	Maheshpur	ST	Joseph Murmu	Swatantra Party
143	Shikaripara	ST	Bariar Hembrom	Jharkhand Party
144	Raneshwar	ST	Barka Baski	Jharkhand Party
145	Nalla	None	Bisheshwar Khan	Communist Party of India
146	Jamtara	None	Kali Prasad Singh	Swatantra Party
147	Sarath	None	Kamdev Prasad Singh	Praja Socialist Party
148	Madhupur	SC	Chhattu Turi	Swatantra Party
149	Deoghar	None	Sailabala Roy	Indian National Congress
150	Jarmundi	None	Srikant Jha	Indian National Congress
151	Dumka	ST	Paul Murmu	Jharkhand Party
152	Ramgarh	ST	Madan Besra	Jharkhand Party
153	Poraiyahat	ST	Jadunandan Murmu	Indian National Congress
154	Godda	None	Deep Narain Chaudhary	Indian National Congress
155	Mahagama	None	RaJharkhand Partyati Ram	Indian National Congress
156	Pirpainti	None	Baikunth Ram	Indian National Congress
157	Colgong	None	Syed Maqbool Ahmed	Indian National Congress
158	Bhagalpur Muffasil	SC	Bholanath Das	Indian National Congress
159	Bhagalpur	None	Satyendra Narayan Agarwal	Indian National Congress
160	Gopalpur	None	Maya Devi	Indian National Congress
161	Bihpur	None	Sukdeo Choudhary	Indian National Congress
162	Sultanganj	None	Debi Prasad Mahto	Indian National Congress
163	Amarpur	None	Shital Prasad Bhagat	Indian National Congress
164	Dhuraiya	None	Saminuddin Molvi	Indian National Congress
165	Banka	None	Braj Mohan Singh	Swatantra Party
166	Belhar	None	Raghvendra Narain Singh	Indian National Congress
167	Katoria	ST	Kampa Murmu	Swatantra Party
168	Chakai	ST	Lakhan Murmu	Socialist Party
169	Jhajha	None	Shri Krishna Singh	Socialist Party
170	Jamui	SC	Guru Ram Das	Indian National Congress
171	Sikandra	None	Mushtaque Ahmed Shah	Indian National Congress
172	Sheikhpura	None	Sheoshanker Singh	Indian National Congress
173	Barbigha	SC	Leela Devi	Indian National Congress
174	Burhee	None	Kapildeo Singh	Praja Socialist Party
175	Surajgarha	None	Rajeshwari Prasad Singh	Indian National Congress
176	Tarapur	None	Jaimangal Singh	Indian National Congress
177	Khargpur	None	Nandkumar Singh	Indian National Congress
178	Monghyr	None	Ramgovind Singh Verma	Indian National Congress
179	Jamalpur	None	Yogendra Mahton	Indian National Congress
180	Parbatta	None	Lakshmi Devi	Indian National Congress
181	Chautham	None	Ghanshyam Singh	Indian National Congress
182	Bakhtiarpur	None	Mohammad Salahuddin Chaudhry	Indian National Congress
183	Alauli	SC	Mishri Sada	Indian National Congress
184	Khagaria	None	Kedar Narayan Singh Azad	Indian National Congress
185	Balia	None	Prema Devi	Indian National Congress
186	Begusarai	None	Ram Narain Choudhary	Indian National Congress
187	Bakhri	SC	Medni PaSwatantra Partyn	Indian National Congress
188	Bariarpur	None	Harihar Mahto	Indian National Congress
189	Teghra	None	Chandrasekhar Singh	Communist Party of India
190	Bachhwara	None	Girish Kumari Singh	Indian National Congress
191	Barh	None	Rana Sheolakh Pati Singh	Indian National Congress
192	Mokamah	None	Saryoo Nandan Prasad Singh	Independent politician
193	Asthawan	None	Kaushlendra Pd. Narayan Singh	Praja Socialist Party
194	Bihar North	None	Syed Wasiuddin Ahmed	Indian National Congress
195	Bihar South	None	Girwardhari Singh	Indian National Congress
196	Rajgrih	SC	Baldeo Prasad	Indian National Congress
197	Islampur	None	Shyam Sunder Prasad	Swatantra Party
198	Chandi	None	Ram Raj Prasad Singh	Praja Socialist Party
199	Hilsa	None	Jagdish Prasad	Jan Sangh
200	Bakhtiarpur	None	Ramyatna Singh	Indian National Congress
201	Fatwa	SC	Kauleshwar Das	Indian National Congress
202	Masaurhi	SC	Saraswati Chaudhary	Indian National Congress
203	Punpun	None	Nawal Kishore Singh	Indian National Congress
204	Naubatpur	None	Dasu Sinha	Indian National Congress
205	Patna South	None	Badri Nath Verma	Indian National Congress
206	Patna	None	Zahra Ahmad	Indian National Congress
207	Patna West	None	Krishna Ballabh Sahay	Indian National Congress
208	Dinapur	None	Ram Sewak Singh	Socialist Party
209	Maner	None	Budhdeo Singh	Indian National Congress
210	Bikram	None	Manorma Devi	Indian National Congress
211	Paliganj	None	Ramlakhan Singh Yadav	Indian National Congress
212	Sandesh	None	Jhaman Prasad	Indian National Congress
213	Arrah	None	Sumitra Devi	Indian National Congress
214	Arrah	None	Muffasil Ambika Singh	Indian National Congress
215	Shahpur	None	Ramanand Tiwari	Praja Socialist Party
216	Barhampur	None	Budhi Nath Singh	Independent politician
217	Dumraon	None	Kumar Ganga Prasad Singh	Indian National Congress
218	Nawanagar	None	Suraj Prasad	Communist Party of India
219	Buxar	None	Jagnarain Trivedi	Indian National Congress
220	Ramgarh	None	Bishwanath Rai	Indian National Congress
221	Mohania	None	Mangal Charan Singh	Indian National Congress
222	Chainpur	SC	Ram Krishan Ram	Indian National Congress
223	Bhabua	None	Shyam Narain Pandey	Indian National Congress
224	Chenari	SC	Shri Gobind Ram	Indian National Congress
225	Sasaram	None	Dukhan Ram	Indian National Congress
226	Dehri	None	Abdul Qaiyum Ansari	Indian National Congress
227	Nokha	None	Guthuli Singh	Indian National Congress
228	Dinara	None	Ram Ashish Singh	Praja Socialist Party
229	Bikramganj	None	Manorama Pandey	Indian National Congress
230	Dawath	None	Krishnaraj Singh	Indian National Congress
231	Jagdishpur	SC	Sukar Ram	Praja Socialist Party
232	Piro	None	Indramani Singh	Indian National Congress
233	Sahar	None	Sheo Pujan Rai	Indian National Congress
234	Arwal	None	Budhan Mehta	Indian National Congress
235	Kurtha	None	Ramcharan Singh	Praja Socialist Party
236	Makhdumpur	None	Sukhdeo Prasad Verma	Indian National Congress
237	Jahanabad	SC	Mahabir Chaudhary	Indian National Congress
238	Ghosi	None	Mithileshwar Pd. Singh	Indian National Congress
239	Belaganj	SC	Rameshwar Manjhi	Indian National Congress
240	Goh	None	Thakur Munishwar Nath Singh	Indian National Congress
241	Daudnagar	None	Ram Narayan Singh Yadav	Indian National Congress
242	Obra	SC	Dilkeshwar Ram	Indian National Congress
243	Nabinagar	None	Satyendra Narain Sinha	Indian National Congress
244	Aurangabad	None	Brijmohan Singh	Swatantra Party
245	Rafiganj	None	Ram Pukar Singh	Swatantra Party
246	Imamganj	None	Ambika Prasad Singh	Swatantra Party
247	Sherghati	None	Md. Shahjahan	Indian National Congress
248	Barachatti	None	Mustaque Ali Khan	Swatantra Party
249	Bodh Gaya	None	Kuldeep Mahto	Swatantra Party
250	Koch	None	Mundrika Singh	Praja Socialist Party
251	Gaya	None	Shyam Barthwar	Independent politician
252	Gaya	None	Muffasil Hardeo Singh	Indian National Congress
253	Atri	None	Sheo Ratan Singh	Indian National Congress
254	Hisua	None	Rajkumari Devi	Indian National Congress
255	Nawada	None	Gaurishanker Keshari	Jan Sangh
256	Warsaliganj	None	Ramkishun Singh	Indian National Congress
257	Pakribarwan	SC	Chetu Ram	Indian National Congress
258	Rajauli	None	RamSwatantra Partyrup Prasad Yadav	Indian National Congress
259	Dhanwar	SC	Gopal Rabidas	Swatantra Party
260	Gawan	None	Girija Prasad Singh	Swatantra Party
261	Jamua	None	Indra Narain Singh	Swatantra Party
262	Giridih	None	Raghunandan Ram	Indian National Congress
263	Dumri	ST	Hemlal Pragnait	Swatantra Party
264	Bermo	None	Bindeshwari Dubey	Indian National Congress
265	Bagodar	None	Moti Ram	Swatantra Party
266	Barhi	None	Kamakshya Narain Singh	Swatantra Party
267	Kodarma	None	Awadh Bihari Dikshit	Indian National Congress
268	Chauparan	None	Nand Kishore Singh	Swatantra Party
269	Chatra	None	Keshaw Prasad Singh	Swatantra Party
270	Barkagaon	None	Shasank Manjari	Swatantra Party
271	Hazaribagh	None	Gyani Ram	Indian National Congress
272	Mandu	None	Raghunandan Prasad	Swatantra Party
273	Ramgarh	None	Tara Prasad Bakshi	Swatantra Party
274	Petarbar	ST	Rameshwar Manjhi	Swatantra Party
275	Topchanchi	None	Purnendu Narayan Singh	Swatantra Party
276	Kenduadih	SC	Ram Lal Das	Indian National Congress
277	Dhanbad	None	Sheoraj Prasad	Indian National Congress
278	Tundi	None	Gokhuleshwar Mishra	Swatantra Party
279	Nirsa	ST	Lakshminarayan Manjhi	Indian National Congress
280	Jorapokhar	None	Ram Narain Sharma	Indian National Congress
281	Chas	None	Parbati Charan Mahto	Swatantra Party
282	Bahragora	None	Jhareswar Ghosh	Independent politician
283	Ghatshila	ST	Basta Soren	Communist Party of India
284	Potka	ST	Majhi Rasraj Tudu	Indian National Congress
285	Jamshedpur	None	Ramavatar Singh	Communist Party of India
286	Jugsalai	None	Sunil Mukherjee	Communist Party of India
287	Seraikella	None	Nrupendra Narayan Singh Deo	Independent politician
288	Chaibasa	ST	Harish Chandra Deogam	Jharkhand Party
289	Manjari	ST	Vivekanand Pareya	Jharkhand Party
290	Majhgaon	ST	Sharan Balmuchu	Jharkhand Party
291	Manoharpur	None	Shubhnath Deogam	Jharkhand Party
292	Sonua	ST	Sanatan Samad	Jharkhand Party
293	Chakradharpur	None	Sarangi Rudra	Independent politician
294	Chandil West	SC	Nathuniram Chamar	Indian National Congress
295	Chandil East	None	Prabhat Kumar Aditya Deb	Swatantra Party
296	Tamar	ST	Dhan Singh Munda	Jharkhand Party
297	Sonahatu	SC	Somar Ram	Swatantra Party
298	Ranchi	None	Birendra Nath Ray	Indian National Congress
299	Silli	None	Jagesar Chowdhary	Swatantra Party
300	Ranchi	None	Sadar Ambika Nath Sahdeo	Swatantra Party
301	Khunti	ST	Phulchand Kachchap	Jharkhand Party
302	Torpa	ST	Samuel Munda	Jharkhand Party
303	Kolebira	ST	Sushil Bage	Jharkhand Party
304	Simdega	ST	Simon Oraon	Jharkhand Party
305	Chainpur	ST	Michael	Swatantra Party
306	Gumla	ST	Punai Oraon	Jharkhand Party
307	Sisai	ST	Sitaram Bhagat	Swatantra Party
308	Lohardaga	ST	Sushil Bakhla	Swatantra Party
309	Bero	ST	Paul Dayal	Jharkhand Party
310	Mandar	None	Zahoor Ali Mohammad	Indian National Congress
311	Latehar	ST	John Berchmans Munzani	Swatantra Party
312	Panki	None	Deo Lal Jagdhatri Nath Sah	Swatantra Party
313	Daltonganj	None	Sachidanand Tripathy	Swatantra Party
314	Garhwa	None	Gopi Nath Prasad Singh	Swatantra Party
315	Bhawanathpur	None	Shanker Pratap Deo	Swatantra Party
316	Hussainabad	SC	Ramdeni Ram	Indian National Congress
317	Bishrampur	None	Krishna Murari Singh	Swatantra Party
318	Leslieganj	SC	Ram Krishna Ram	Swatantra Party
