= Poiwan =

Coordinates: 24.7457°N 84.4476°E

Poiwan is a village in the Aurangabad district of Bihar in India. The population is around 2,600, of which around 8% are Muslims.

== History ==
Poiwan is a very old village. According to a written record which is kept in this village only, it existed in the 17th century. It is said that first a Muslim zamindaar (minor king) ruled this village. After that, four Kshatriya (warrior clan) brothers came from the Mainpur district of Rajasthan to claim this village with the help of another local Hindu zamindar. Two of them died in that battle which they won finally. After that, this village remains a Hindu-dominated village.

There is an old small fort in the village commonly said by local people as gaadh, as well as a temple and a large water reservoir, the latter being used for fishing and as a water supply in the summer. Poiwan has a government high school. There is one lord Radha Krishna temple built by Er Ajit Pratap Narayan Singh and her wife Sunita singh inaugurated by then governor of Nagaland Sri Nikhil kumar on 17-1-2011.

== Notable persons ==
- Dr. Anugrah Narayan Sinha (1887-1957), known as Bihar Vibhuti, statesman, Gandhian, freedom fighter, nationalist, role in the struggle for independence along with Mahatma Gandhi, first Deputy Chief Minister of Bihar
- Satyendra Narayan Sinha (1917-2006), also known as Chhote Saheb, former Chief Minister of Bihar, statesman and First Member of Parliament from Aurangabad, leading figure of Jayaprakash Narayan’s ‘complete revolution’ movement during the Emergency, son of Bihar Vibhuti.
- Nikhil Kumar (born 1941), Indian Police Service officer, Police Commissioner of Delhi, ex-governor of the states of Nagaland and Kerala, son of former Chief Minister of Bihar Satyendra Narayan Sinha.
