= Krishna Ballabh Sahay =

Indian politician (1898–1974)

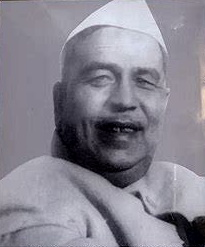

Member Bihar Legislative Council
- In office 1937–1939

Member of Constituent Assembly of India
- In office 9 December 1946 – 26 January 1950
- Preceded by: Position established
- Succeeded by: Position abolished

Revenue Minister, Government of Bihar
- In office 20 April 1947 – 2 August 1962
- Chief Minister: S. K. Singh

Member Bihar Legislative Assembly
- In office 1952–1967
- Constituency: Giridih

4th Chief Minister of Bihar
- In office 2 October 1963 – 5 March 1967
- Preceded by: Binodanand Jha
- Succeeded by: Mahamaya Prasad Sinha

Personal details
- Born: 31 December 1898 Sheikhpura, Bengal Presidency, British India
- Died: 3 June 1974 (aged 75) Hazaribagh, Jharkhand, India
- Party: Indian National Congress
- Education: St. Columba's College
- Profession: Social activist, politician
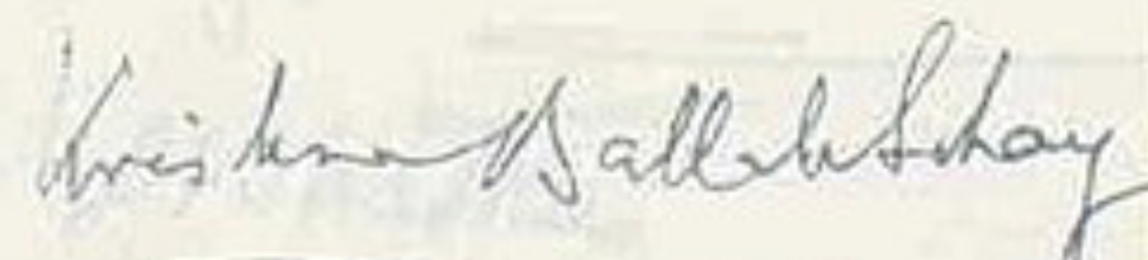
- Signature
- Nickname: K B Sahay

Krishna Ballabh Sahay (31 December 1898 – 3 June 1974) was an Indian independence activist and politician who was the fourth Chief Minister of Bihar.

== Early life ==
Sahay was born to an Ambashtha Kayastha Hindu family on 31 December 1898 in Sheikhpura, Bihar. He was the eldest son of Munshi Ganga Prasad, who was a darogha in the British Raj at Padma Hazaribagh. In 1919, Sahay received a B. A. degree with honours in English from St. Columba's College, Hazaribagh (then affiliated with Calcutta University. He was awarded a gold medal from the governor of Bihar and Orissa, Edward Albert Gait, for his excellence in English.

== Independence movement ==
In 1920, Sahay joined the civil-disobedience movement led by Mahatma Gandhi. Between 1930 and 1934, he was jailed four times while participating in the Indian independence movement. Sahay met his mentor, Sri Babu, during one of his incarcerations, and they remained friends for the rest of his life. He was also close to Anugrah Narayan Sinha, another nationalist leader from Bihar.

In 1942 came Gandhi's battle cry of "Do or Die" for the Quit India Movement. Before this, senior leaders (including Rajendra Prasad and Anugrah Narayan Sinha) visited Bihar. They conveyed the conclusions of the Vardhan Accord and chartered an action plan for Bihar in the movement during a meeting at Sadaquat Ashram. Sahay was a notable contributor to the plan. The Quit India Movement was launched across India, and Sahay led it at Hazaribagh. The British Raj ordered the arrest of its leaders, and an order to arrest Sahay was issued by the deputy commissioner of Hazaribagh (Order 132, dated 8 October 1942); the following day, he was jailed. With his associates Rama Nandan Mishra, Yogendra Shukla, Suraj Narayan Singh, Sri Gulab Chand Gupta and Sri Shaligram Singh, Sahay was instrumental in the escape of Jayaprakash Narayan from Hazaribagh Central Jail on 9 November 1942. As a consequence, he was sent to the Bhagalpur jail.

== Political life ==
When provincial autonomy was granted by the British Raj, Sahay was elected to the Bihar Legislative Assembly in 1936 and became a parliamentary secretary in Shri Krishna Sinha's ministry the following year. He contested the first assembly elections of 1952 from Giridih, and won by a comfortable margin to return as revenue minister for the government of Bihar in Sinha's cabinet. In 1957, Sahay was defeated in the Giridih assembly election by Kamakhya Narayan Singh of Padma (Hazaribag). However, he won the 1962 assembly election to enter the Bihar Assembly for the third time. In 1957, during the leadership struggle between S. K. Sinha and Anugrah Narayan Sinha, he supported Anugrah Sinha as chief minister. Sahay became chief minister, with Anugrah Sinha as his deputy.

== Chief Minister of Bihar ==
During the following years, veteran Congress leader K. Kamaraj proposed a plan to strengthen the party. On 19 September 1963, with the announcement of the Kamaraj Plan, came news of Binodanand Jha's appointment as one of the eight chief ministers to supervise the Congress Party. Beer Chand Patel threw his hat in the ring as Chief Minister of Bihar. Sahay, deputy minister in Jha's cabinet, was the other contestant. Education Minister Satyendra Narayan Sinha, second-in-command of the Jha cabinet, announced his support for Sahay. Sahay received twice as many votes as Patel, and was elected from the Patna West constituency.

On 2 October 1963, Gandhi's birth anniversary was celebrated in Bihar with the swearing-in of Sahay as the fourth Chief Minister of Bihar; Satyendra Narayan Sinha was again second-in-command. Sahay lost the 1967 elections but won the 1974 local-body elections to enter the Bihar Legislative Council as an MLC. He was vindicated after inquiries by the Aiyyar Commission. Sahay died in a 3 June 1974 road accident, just after winning the election, on the way back to his birthplace of Hazaribag.
