= Ram Naresh Singh =

Indian politician

Member of Parliament, Lok Sabha
- In office 1989–1996
- Preceded by: Satyendra Narayan Singh
- Succeeded by: Virendra Kumar Singh
- Constituency: Aurangabad, Bihar

Personal details
- Born: 1 January 1936 Bankagaon, Bhojpur District, Bihar, British India
- Party: Janata Dal

Ram Naresh Singh is an Indian politician. He was elected to the Lok Sabha, the lower house of the Parliament of India from Aurangabad in Bihar as a member of the Janata Dal.
