= Deep Narayan Singh =

Indian politician (1894–1977)

2nd Chief Minister of Bihar
- In office 1 February 1961 – 18 February 1961
- Preceded by: Shri Krishna Sinha
- Succeeded by: Binodanand Jha

3rd Minister of Finance of Bihar
- In office 1 February 1961 – 18 February 1961
- Preceded by: Shri Krishna Sinha
- Succeeded by: Beer Chand Patel

Personal details
- Born: 25 November 1894 Purantand, Bengal Presidency, British India
- Died: 7 December 1977 (aged 83) Hajipur, Bihar, India
- Party: Indian National Congress
- Spouse: Mamlata devi

Deep Narayan Singh (25 November 1894 – 7 December 1977) was an Indian politician, participant in the Indian independence movement, and a former Chief Minister of Bihar.

Born in Purantand, Bihar, Singh was a Member of the Constituent Assembly of India which was elected to write the Constitution of India. He also served as part of India's first Parliament as an independent nation and was a Member of the Bihar Legislative Assembly. He was associated with the triumvirate of nationalists Rajendra Babu, Anugraha Babu and Shri babu. He succeeded Krishna Singh as the Chief Minister of Bihar.

In 1979, a museum was established in his honour by the Directorate of Archaeology and Museum in Hajipur, Bihar.
