= Shyama Singh =

Indian politician

Member of Parliament for Aurangabad
- In office 1999–2004
- Preceded by: Sushil Kumar
- Succeeded by: Nikhil kumar
- Constituency: Aurangabad

Vice-President Bihar Pradesh Congress Committee
- In office 2004–2017
- Constituency: Aurangabad

Personal details
- Born: 26 November 1942 Patna, Bihar
- Died: 11 September 2017 (aged 74) Delhi
- Party: INC
- Spouse: Nikhil Kumar
- As of 7 September, 2009

Shyama Singh (born 26 November 1942 – 11 September 2017) was an Indian politician and a former Member of Parliament from the Aurangabad (Bihar) (Lok Sabha constituency) and was married to the former Governor of Nagaland and Kerala, Nikhil Kumar, who was also elected to the 14th Lok Sabha from the same constituency in Bihar. She joined Congress at the initiative of Rajiv Gandhi, the late Prime Minister of India, whom she met at a social event in Delhi.As a parliamentarian, her crowning achievement was reviving the Nabinagar Super Thermal Power Project which her father-in-law and veteran Bihar leader Late Satyendra Narayan Singh had conceived in 1989 as the then Chief Minister of Bihar.Shyama Singh was also the vice president of the Bihar Pradesh Congress Committee.

== Early life ==
She is daughter of Indian Civil Service officer Sir T. P. Singh who had also served as independent India's first finance secretary and her mother Madhuri Singh, has been a two-term member of Parliament from Purnea. She completed her school education from Patna. Thereafter, she graduated in History from Indraprastha College for Women. Her elder brother is former bureaucrat and Rajya Sabha MP N. K. Singh (A 1964 batch IAS officer of the Bihar cadre) who has served as India's Revenue Secretary and also Principal Secretary to the Prime Minister of India. Her younger brother Uday Singh also twice represented the Purnea Lok Sabha constituency of Bihar in Lok Sabha. Her father-in-law and former Bihar Chief Minister Late Chhote Saheb (S.N. Sinha), also represented Aurangabad (Bihar) (Lok Sabha constituency)for seven consecutive terms in the Lok Sabha.

== First Lady of Nagaland ==
Her husband took the oath of office and secrecy as the Governor of Nagaland on 15 October 2009 and she became the first lady of Nagaland. She was also known for her interest in gardening, and her garden at 28 Akbar Road, occupied by her family for some 30 years, had won awards for its well-maintained nature.

== First Lady of Kerala ==
She became the First Lady of Kerala when Shri Nikhil Kumar became the Governor of Kerala in 2013

== Member of Parliament ==
Shyama, hailing from a renowned family of bureaucrats in Bihar, successfully contested and represented the Aurangabad parliamentary constituency in the Lok Sabha from 1999–2004. As an MP, She initiated several development projects in Schools, Women's College and a new computer centre was set up in the district.

== Demise ==
Shyama Singh passed away during the course of her treatment at Delhi's Escorts Fortis hospital in the wee hours of 11 September 2017 after a prolonged illness.The Congress chief Sonia Gandhi while expressing her deep condolences remarked in her message " (Shyama) Singh served the people with immense dedication and her noteworthy contributions to the well-being of the people of Aurangabad shall be never be forgotten.” The Bihar Chief Minister Nitish Kumar in his condolence message said Singh was a popular politician and a noted social worker.

== Sources ==
- Mere Sansmaran, an autobiography by Dr. Anugrah Narayan Sinha
- Anugrah Abhinandan Granth samiti. 1947 Anugrah Abhinandan Granth. Bihar.
- Anugrah Narayan centenary year celebration Committee. 1987. Bihar Bibhuti : Vayakti Aur Kriti , Bihar.
- Bimal Prasad (editor). 1980. A Revolutionary's Quest: Selected Writings of Jayaprakash Narayan. Oxford University Press, Delhi.

== See also ==
- Sisters Under The Skin
- Governor, CM & MP Condole demise of Shyama Singh
- Former MP Shyama Singh passes away ex MP Shyama Singh dead
- Shyama Singh
- Governor Nikhil Kumar-Profile
- Nitish Condoles Shyama Singh Death
