= Rameshwar Prasad Sinha =

Member of Constituent Assembly
- In office 9 December 1946 – 26 January 1950
- Preceded by: Post Created
- Succeeded by: None
- Constituency: Vaishali

Personal details
- Died: 1965 Patna
- Children: Kishori Sinha

Rameshwar Prasad Sinha (also transliterated as Rameshwar Prasad Singh) was an Indian statesman and a participant in the Indian independence movement. He was a Member of the Constituent Assembly of India which was elected to write the Constitution of India, and served as its first Parliament as an independent nation. He was also a Member of the Legislative Assembly of Bihar. He was known for his oratorical skills and his speeches to the masses, both in English and Hindi. He started practising law in 1915, but gave it up in 1921 to take part in Mahatma Gandhi's non-co-operation movement. He was imprisoned twice during the freedom struggle.

His only daughter Kishori Sinha was also a Two-term Member of Parliament from the Vaishali constituency and is married to Satyendra Narayan Sinha a former Chief Minister of Bihar. He died in 1965.

== Bibliography ==
- Members of Constituent Assembly from Bihar
- A gentleman among politicians
- A plea for the reconstruction of Indian polity
