= Aurangabad Lok Sabha constituency =

Aurangabad Lok Sabha constituency may refer to:

- Aurangabad, Bihar Lok Sabha constituency
- Aurangabad, Maharashtra Lok Sabha constituency
