= Sushil Kumar Singh =

Sushil Kumar Singh may refer to:

- Sushilkumar Singh Chongtham (born 1981), Indian footballer
- Sushil Kumar Singh (politician) (born 1963), Indian politician
