= Mudrika Sinha =

Indian politician (born 1914)

Member of Parliament, Lok Sabha
- In office 1967–1971
- Preceded by: Maharani Lalita Rajya Lakshmi
- Succeeded by: Satyendra Narayan Sinha
- Constituency: Aurangabad, Bihar

Personal details
- Born: February 1914
- Party: Indian National Congress

Mudrika Sinha (born February 1914, date of death unknown) was an Indian politician. He was elected to the lower House of the Indian Parliament the Lok Sabha from Aurangabad in Bihar as a member of the Indian National Congress.
