= List of honorary titles of Indian leaders =

Titles of Indian leaders

The following is the list of honorary titles given to various Indian leaders during Indian independence struggle.

Honorary title	Meaning	Statesman	Photos
Azad	"Free" (Urdu) Figuratively = "The Freed Soul"	Chandra Shekhar Tiwari	
• Babasaheb • Mooknayak	"The Respected Father" (Marathi). "Baba" = "father" and "Saheb" = "sir" "Captain of the Voiceless" (Marathi) (Hindi). "Mook" = "Voiceless" and "Nayak" = "Captain".	Bhimrao Ramji Ambedkar	
• Bacha Khan • Badshah Khan • Fakhr-e-Afghan • Sarhadi Gandhi	"Bacha Khan" = "King of Chiefs" "Badshah Khan" = Master King of Kings "Pride of Afghans" (Urdu) "Fakhr" = "Pride" and "Afghan" = "Afghan" "Frontier Gandhi" (Hindi) "Sarhad" = "Frontier" (North-West Frontier Province) and "Gandhi" = "Gandhi"	Abdul Ghaffar Khan	
Bihar Kesari	"Lion of Bihar" (Hindi/Sanskrit) "Bihar" = "Bihar" and "Kesari" = "Lion"	Shri Krishna Sinha	
Bihar Vibhuti	"Sacred Ash of Bihar" (Hindi). "Bihar" = "Bihar" and "Vibhuti" = "Sacred Ash"	Anugrah Narayan Sinha	
Deenabandhu	"Friend of the Poor" (Bengali). "Deen" = "Poor" and "Bandhu" = "Friend".	Charles Freer Andrews	
Deshabandhu	"Friend of Country" (Bengali). "Desh" = "Country" and "Bandhu" = "Friend".	Chittaranjan Das	
• Deshanayak • Netaji	"Captain of the Country" (Bengali). "Desh" = "Country" and "Nayak" = "Captain". "Respected Leader" (Hindi). "Neta" = "Leader" and "Ji" = an honorary suffix.	Subhash Chandra Bose	
Deshapriya	"Beloved of the country" (Bengali). "Desh" = "Country" and "Priya" = "Beloved".	Jatindra Mohan Sengupta	
Desh Ratna	"Jewel of the Country" (Hindi). "Desh" = "country" and "Ratna" = "jewel"	Rajendra Prasad	
• Gurudev • Kobiguru • Biswakobi • The Bard of Bengal	"Divine Teacher" (Bengali) (Hindi). "Guru" = "Teacher" and "Deva" = "divine".	Rabindranath Tagore	
Lokmanya	"Revered by the People" (Marathi). "Lok" = "People" and "Manya" = "Revered".	Bal Gangadhar Tilak	
Loknayak	"Captain of the People" (Hindi). "Lok" = "People" and "Nayak" = "Captain".	Jayaprakash Narayan	
Mahamana	"Great Heart" (Hindi). "Mahan" = "great" and "Mana" = "thought/heart".	Madan Mohan Malaviya	
Mahatma	"Great Soul" (Sanskrit). "Maha" = "Great" and "Atma" = "Soul".	Mohandas Karamchand Gandhi	
Mahatma	"Great Soul" (Sanskrit). "Maha" = "Great" and "Atma" = "soul".	Jyotirao Govindrao Phule	
Maulana	"Guardian" (Arabic).	Abul Kalam Azad	
Chacha	"Paternal Uncle" (Hindi)	Jawaharlal Nehru	
Punjab Kesari	"Lion of Punjab" (Hindi) "Punjab" = "Punjab" and "Kesari" = "Lion"	Lala Lajpat Rai	
Sardar	"Commander" (Persian). "Sar" = "Head" and "dar" = "Holder".	Vallabhbhai Patel	
Shaheed-e-Azam	"Greatest Martyr" (Urdu). "Shaheed" = "Martyr" and "Azam" = "Greatest".	Bhagat Singh	
Swadeshi Tamil Naavik	"Kappal Ootiya Tamilan" (Tamil) "Kappal" = "Tamil" and "Naavik" = "Captain"	V O Chidambaram Pillai	
Swantanryaveer or Veer	"Brave Freedom Fighter" (Marathi). "Swantanrya" = "Freedom" and "Veer" = "Brave"	Vinayak Damodar Savarkar	
