= Abhay Kushwaha =

Indian politician (born 1972)

Member of Parliament, Lok Sabha
- Incumbent
- Assumed office 4 June 2024
- Preceded by: Sushil Kumar Singh
- Constituency: Aurangabad, Bihar

Member of Bihar Legislative Assembly
- In office 8 November 2015 – 10 November 2020
- Preceded by: Anil Kumar
- Constituency: Tikari

Leader of Rashtriya Janata Dal in Lok Sabha
- Incumbent
- Assumed office 21 June 2024

Personal details
- Born: Abhay Kumar Sinha; 5 June 1972 (age 53) Kujapi, Bihar, India
- Party: Rashtriya Janata Dal
- Other political affiliations: Janata Dal (United) (till 2024)
- Spouse: Kumari Anjali Bharti (m. 1997)
- Children: 2

Abhay Kushwaha (alias Abhay Kumar Sinha; born 5 June 1972) is an politician in the Republic of India from the Rashtriya Janata Dal, and a Member of Parliament representing Aurangabad (Lok Sabha constituency) in Bihar, India. He was a former Member of Legislative Assembly for Tikari (Vidhan Sabha constituency) in the Gaya district of Bihar. An erstwhile member of Janata Dal (United); he won the 2015 Legislative Assembly election to the Tekari constituency by defeating Anil Kumar of Hindustani Awam Morcha, a political party led by former Bihar Chief Minister, Jitan Ram Manjhi. He defeated Anil Kumar by a substantial margin of votes. While Abhay secured 86,975 votes, Anil won only 55,162. In 2024 Indian general election, he won the Aurangabad, Bihar Lok Sabha constituency by defeating BJP's four term member of parliament, Sushil Kumar Singh. He contested on the symbol of Rashtriya Janata Dal in this election.

== Life and political career ==
Sinha was born to Ramvriksh Prasad and Mundra Devi on 5 June 1972 in a Koeri family. Besides politics, he is also active in the business, owning Ply and Bricks plant in Bihar. He is married to Kumari Anjali Bharti, and is a father of two children. Abhay entered into mainstream politics in 2000. Prior to his entry in state level politics, he had been a Mukhia of Kujapi village in Gaya district of Bihar. He had also occupied several other important posts in the Janata Dal (United) including the post of district president of JD (U) for Gaya and secretary of the organisation for the Gaya district. He finally beat Anil Kumar to become the Member of Legislative Assembly from the Tekari seat in 2015. In 2018 the leadership of JD (U) appointed him as the Bihar state president of the youth wing of the party. He replaced Santosh Kushwaha on this post. In 2020 Bihar Assembly Election Janata Dal (United) made Abhay the candidate from Belaganj Assembly instead of his constituency Tekari.

In 2020 Bihar assembly elections riding upon the wave of anti-incumbency due to growing discontent against JD (U), Surendra Prasad Yadav of Rashtriya Janata Dal defeated Abhay. Despite losing in 2020 Bihar Legislative Assembly elections, he remained active in bringing developmental initiatives of the central and state government schemes in his area of activity, primarily in Gaya region. In 2023, he initiated a bio gas plant in Gaya under Gobar Dhan Yojna to provide compressed bio gas supply to the houses in the locality.

In the year 2015, a parcel bomb blast took place at the residence of Abhay Kushwaha in which his cousin and security guard Santosh Kumar Kushwaha was killed, while trying to dispose it.

Prior to 2024 Indian General Elections in Bihar, he resigned from Janata Dal United and took the membership of Rashtriya Janata Dal. Subsequently, he was made the candidate of the RJD for Lok Sabha elections from Aurangabad Lok Sabha constituency. He faced Sushil Kumar Singh of Bharatiya Janata Party in a tough electoral contest. Before the polls in Aurangabad Lok Sabha constituency, Bharatiya Janata Party filed a complaint to Election Commission of India, in which it accused Kushwaha of asking people to vote in the name of 'caste', which is considered as violation of Model Code of Conduct.

He defeated Sushil Kumar Singh with a margin of over 70,000 votes and became first non-Rajput candidate to win Aurangabad Lok Sabha constituency.

== Controversies ==
Prior to the Bihar Assembly Elections 2015, Kushwaha was caught on camera while dancing with a bar girl on an obscene song. In the video he was seen shaking himself and showering notes on the bar dancer, being fully drunk. The opposition and media highlighted the issue to counter his candidacy for the Tekari seat he was going to contest. In 2020 Bihar Assembly Election, Abhay was among the politicians with most number of criminal cases against them. According to a report of Dainik Bhaskar he had a total of 14 criminal cases against him which included looting and creating hindrance in government contract works.
