= Kishori Sinha =

Indian politician (1925–2016)

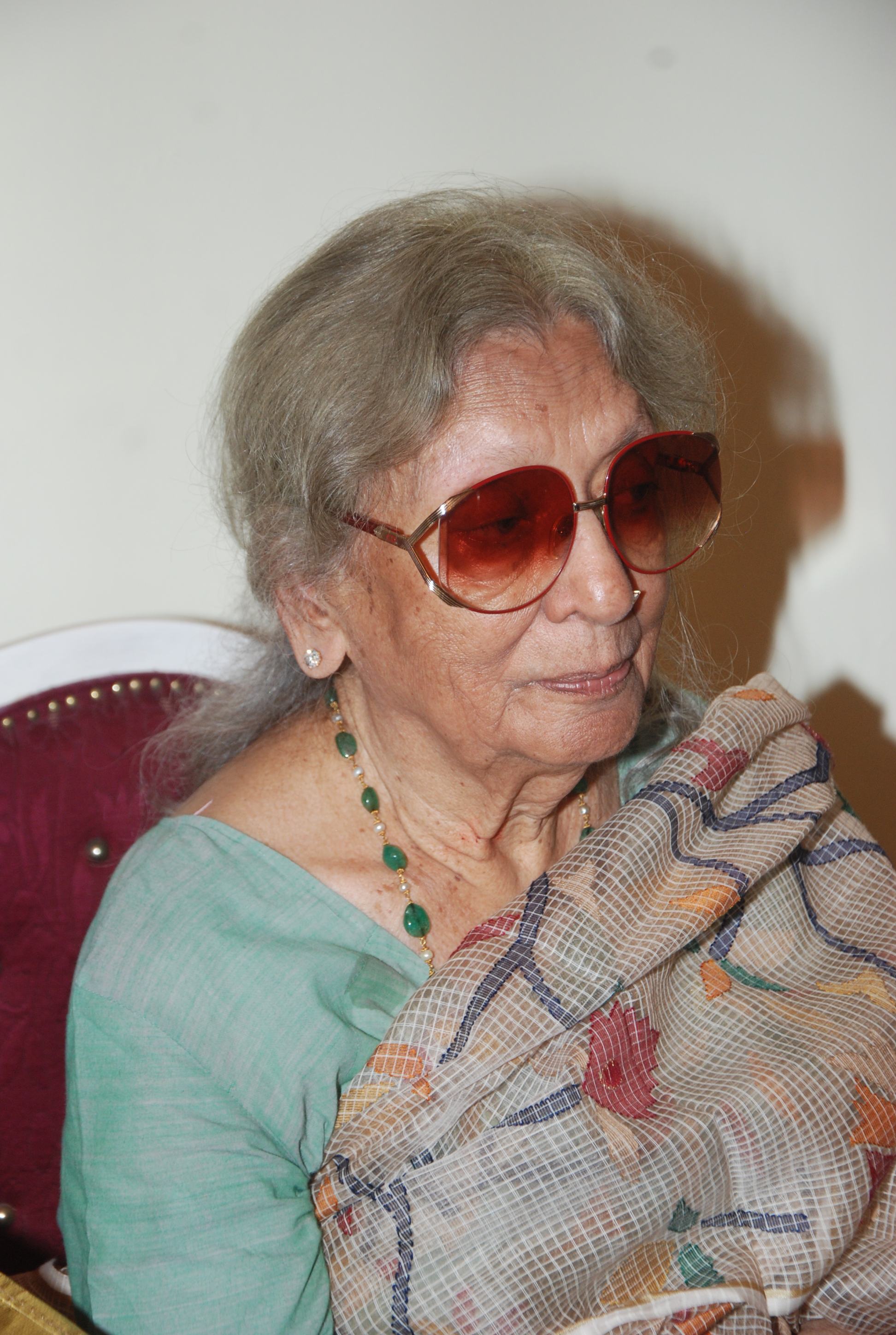

Member of Parliament for Vaishali
- In office 1980–1989
- Prime Minister: Indira Gandhi, Rajiv Gandhi
- Preceded by: Digvijay Narain Singh
- Succeeded by: Usha Sinha

Personal details
- Born: 25 March 1925 Dumra, Bihar and Orissa Province, British India
- Died: 19 December 2016 (aged 91) Patna, Bihar, India
- Party: INC, Janata Party
- Spouse: Satyendra Narayan Sinha
- Children: Nikhil Kumar
- Nickname: Bacchi Ji
- As of 7 September, 2008

Kishori Sinha (25 March 1925 – 19 December 2016) was an Indian politician, social activist, a lifelong advocate of women's empowerment and a former two-term Member of Parliament from the Vaishali constituency. She was married to the former Chief Minister of Bihar Satyendra Narayan Sinha, who was a seven-term Member of Parliament, from the constituency of Aurangabad. Her son Nikhil Kumar had served as the Governor of Kerala and Governor of Nagaland.

== Early life ==
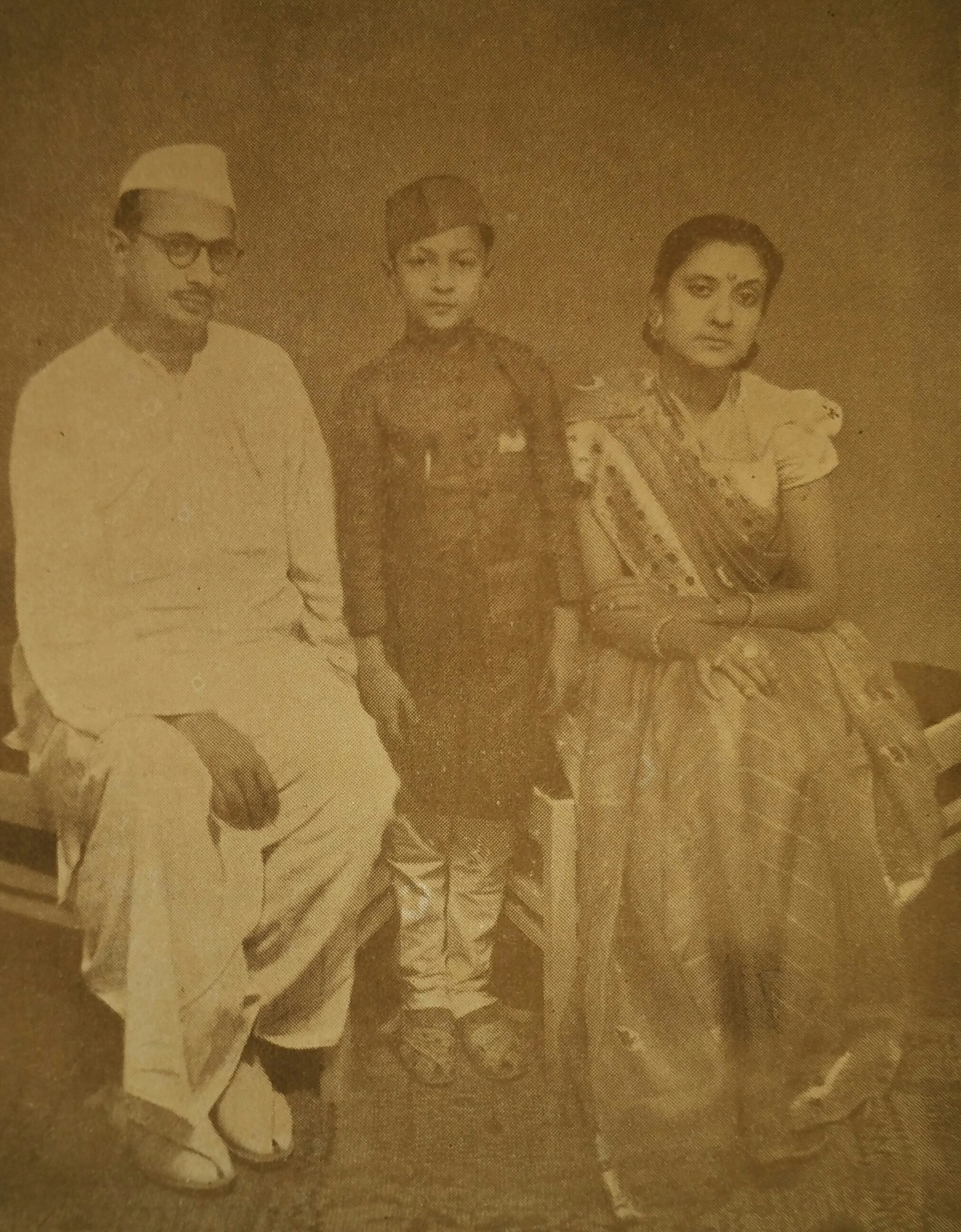
Young Kishori Sinha with S N Sinha & son Nikhil Kumar

She completed her education from Chapman High School, Muzaffarpur. Thereafter, she graduated from Patna Women's college. Born in a politically influential family, she grew up in an intensely political atmosphere. Her grandfather, Rai Saheb Awadh Bihari Singh, was a prominent figure. Her father, Rameshwar Prasad Sinha, was a pivotal figure in the Indian independence movement, and was a Member of the Constituent Assembly of India. She, despite being married at the age of 13 to Satyendra Narayan Sinha, broke many social barriers of the time by acquiring top-class education and entering into public service in various roles.

== Member of Parliament ==
She was elected as a member of the Parliament from Vaishali constituency in 1980; becoming first woman to be elected from the constituency. She was re-elected in 1984. Mrs. Kishori Sinha and her husband Satyendra Narayan Sinha were among the three parliamentary couples in the entire country who were elected together to the 7th Lok Sabha. She had a special interest in Upliftment of Women, Scheduled Castes and Scheduled Tribes and minority community and was also a member of All India Women's Council. Her political life stretched to over six decades.

== Death ==
Sinha who had been admitted in a private hospital in Patna was making satisfactory recovery after the surgery but her condition suddenly worsened and she died on 19 December 2016, at the age of 91. Her Patna residence witnessed a beeline of eminent politicians, cutting across party lines, who came to see her for one last time while paying floral tribute to her. Bihar Governor Ram Nath Kovind, Nitish Kumar, former Chief Ministers of Bihar Lalu Prasad Yadav, Jitan Ram Manjhi, Jagannath Mishra, BJP leaders Rajiv Pratap Rudy, Mangal Pandey, Sushil Kumar Modi and others, Congress leaders Ashok Choudhary, Subodh Kant Sahay and others, RJD leaders Shivanand Tiwari, Ramchandra Purvey, Mundrika Singh Yadav and others, JD(U) ministers from the Cabinet were among many who visited her Patna home to pay their last respects.

== State funeral ==
Bihar Chief Minister Nitish Kumar, who was one of the many politicians to visit Kishori Sinha's residence on Boring Road, announced her funeral with full state honors. He also announced his decision to install a life-size statue of Mrs. Kishori Sinha next to the statue of her husband Satyendra Narayan Sinha at the Satyendra Narayan Sinha park (formerly Children's park) in Sri Krishna Puri.
