= Sushil Kumar Singh (politician) =

Indian politician (born 1963)

Former Member of the India Parliament for Aurangabad, Bihar
- In office 2009–2024
- Preceded by: Nikhil Kumar
- Succeeded by: Abhay Kushwaha
- Constituency: Aurangabad, Bihar

Personal details
- Born: 27 June 1963 (age 63) Aurangabad, Bihar
- Party: Bharatiya Janata Party
- Other political affiliations: Janata Dal United
- Spouse: Arti Singh (m. 1987)
- Children: 3 (2 sons, 1 daughter)
- Education: Anugrah Narayan College
- Occupation: Politician

Sushil Kumar Singh (born 27 June 1963) is an Indian politician and former Member of Parliament in the 16th Lok Sabha from Aurangabad Lok Sabha constituency in Bihar. He has been elected as a Member of Parliament in the 12th Lok Sabha and the 15th Lok Sabha. He is a member of Bharatiya Janata Party, which is ruling party in the Indian Parliament. He was a member of the Standing committee on Coal and Steel, Committee on Public Undertakings and Committee on Petitions. and Consultative Committee of Ministry of Road, Transport and Highways in the 17th Lok Sabha. He joined Bhartiya Janata Party on 7 March 2014 in presence of Rajnath Singh. Earlier he was associated with Janata Dal (United), the ruling party in the state of Bihar.

In 2024 Indian general election, he lost the Aurangabad, Bihar Lok Sabha constituency to the RJD leader Abhay Kumar Sinha with margin of 79111 votes.

== Early life ==
He was born in Aurangabad to Ramnaresh Singh (Lutan singh) and Pushpalata Singh. He completed his early schooling from Gate School (A N High School), Aurangabad, and then enrolled at Banaras Hindu University for his pre-University studies. He graduated in political science from Anugrah Narayan College, Patna, Magadh University.

== Election results ==
2014 Indian general elections: Aurangabad, Bihar
Party	Candidate	Votes	%	±%
BJP	Sushil Kumar Singh	307941	39.16	
INC	Nikhil Kumar	241594	30.72	
JD(U)	Bagi Kumar Verma	136137	17.31	
NOTA	None of the Above	17454	2.22%	
Majority		66,347		
Turnout		786274	51.19	
BJP gain from JD(U)		Swing		
