= Shri Krishna Sinha =

Indian politician

Shri Krishna Singh
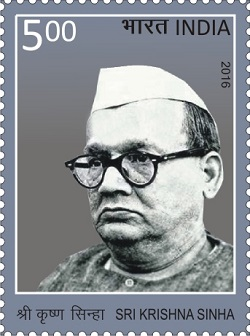

1st Chief Minister of Bihar
- In office 15 August 1947 – 31 January 1961
- Preceded by: Office Established
- Succeeded by: Deep Narayan Singh

2nd Finance Minister of Bihar
- In office 5 July 1957 – 31 January 1961
- Preceded by: Anugrah Narayan Sinha
- Succeeded by: Deep Narayan Singh

2nd Premier of Bihar Province
- In office 20 July 1937 – 31 October 1939
- Preceded by: Mohammad Yunus
- Succeeded by: Governor's rule
- In office 2 April 1946 - 15 August 1947

Member Of the Constituent Assembly
- In office 9 December 1946 – 26 January 1950
- Preceded by: Post Created
- Succeeded by: Post Abolished

Member of the Bihar Legislative Assembly
- In office 1952–1961
- Preceded by: Position Established
- Succeeded by: Shiv Shankar Singh

Personal details
- Born: 21 October 1887 Barbigha, Bengal Presidency, British India
- Died: 31 January 1961 (aged 74) Patna, Bihar, India
- Party: Indian National Congress
- Children: 2
- Education: University of Calcutta, Patna University
- Occupation: Lawyer; Nationalist; Statesman; Educationist; Administrator
- Nickname(s): Bihar Kesari, Shri Babu

Shri Krishna Singh (Sinha) (21 October 1887 – 31 January 1961), also known as Shri Babu, was the first chief minister of the Indian state of Bihar (1946–61). Except for the period of World War II, Sinha was the chief minister of Bihar from the time of the first Congress Ministry in 1937 until his death in 1961. He led the Dalit entry into the Baidyanath Dham, Deoghar. He was the first chief minister in the country to abolish the zamindari system. He was imprisoned for a total of about eight years in British India. He held mass meetings at which he spoke. He was known as Bihar Kesari for his "lionlike roars" in public speaking.

The former President of India, Pratibha Patil, released a book on the letters of exchange between Sinha and prime minister Jawaharlal Nehru titled Freedom and Beyond. The correspondence between Nehru and Sinha touches on subjects such as Indian democracy in the making in the early years of Independence, Centre-State relations, role of governor, turbulence in Nepal, zamindari abolition, and education. Sinha gave his personal collection of 17,000 books to the public library in Munger in 1959 which is now named Sri Krishna Seva Shadan after him which in 2016 was reportedly in poor condition due to lack of funding.

== Early life and family ==
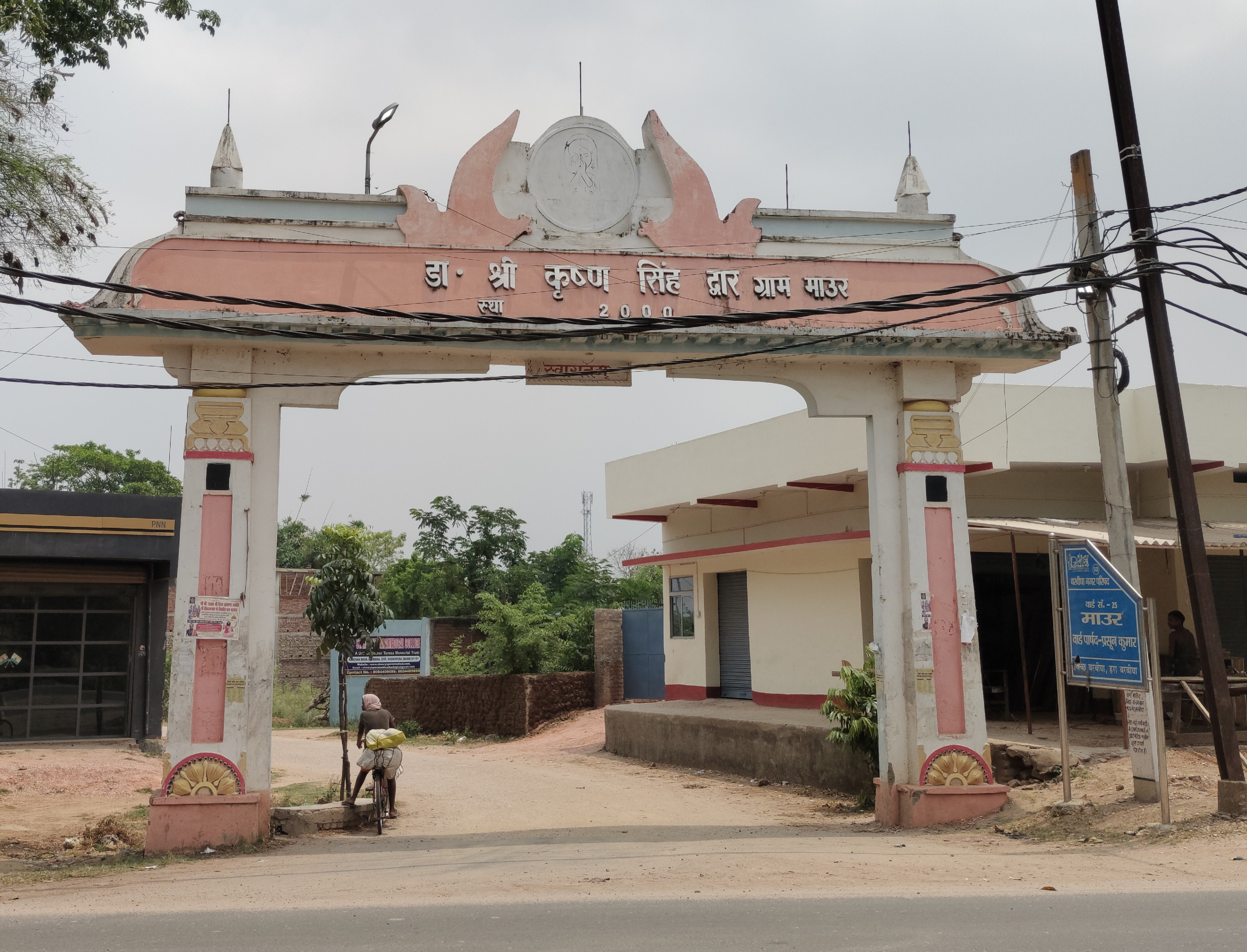
The village gate in which Shri Babu was born

Sinha was born in a Bhumihar family on 21 October 1887 in the village of Maur, Barbigha in the Munger district of Bengal Presidency (now part of Sheikhpura district). His mother died of plague when he was five years old. He was educated in the village school and at Zila School in Munger. In 1906 he joined Patna College, which was then an affiliate of the University of Calcutta. He obtained a master's degree from the University of Calcutta and then doctorate of law from Patna University and started practising in Munger from 1915. In the meantime, he married and had two sons, Shivshankar and Bandishankar (Swaraj Babu) who later held various posts in the state government.

== Independence movement ==
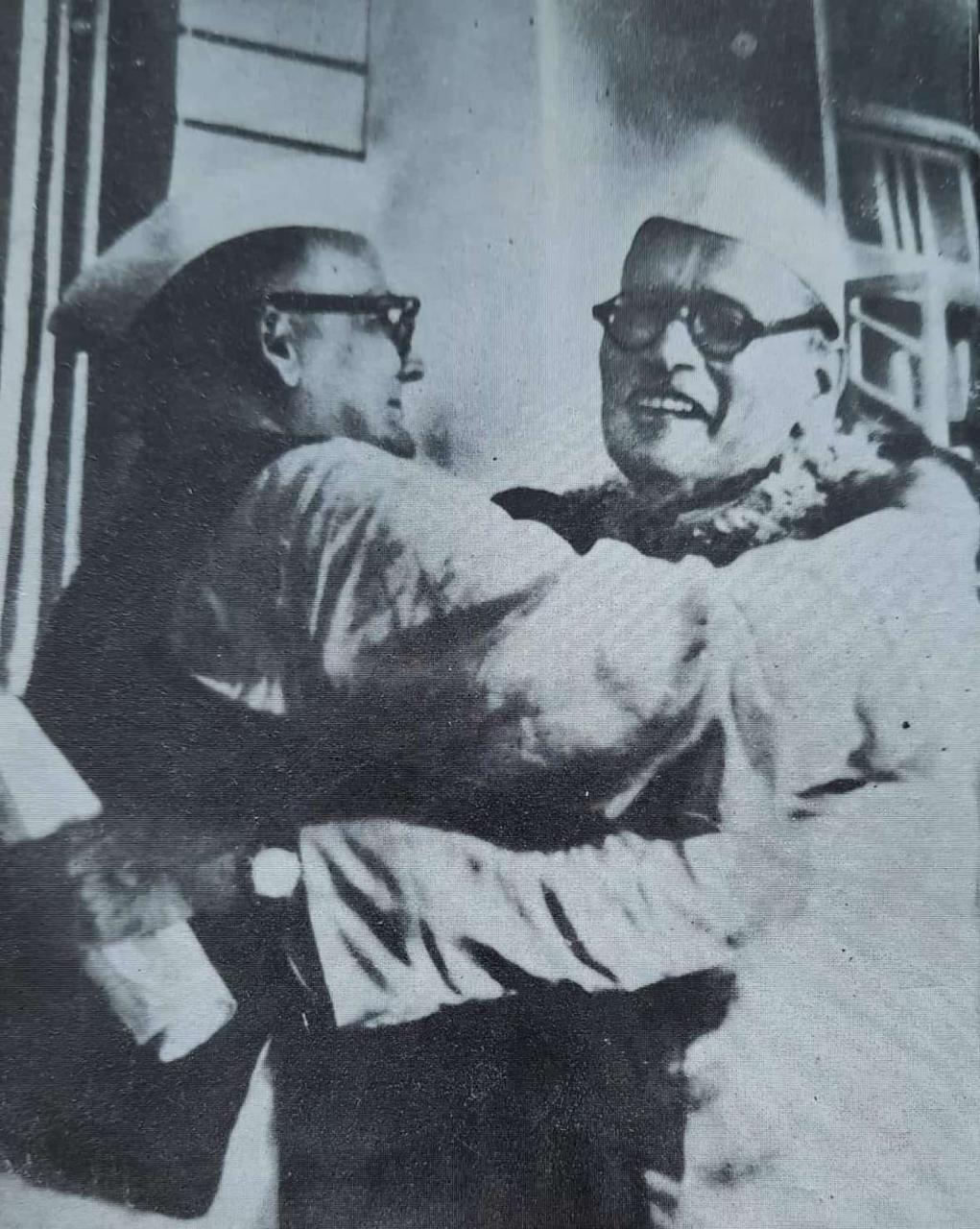
Bihar Kesari Shri Babu & Bihar Vibhuti Dr. A.N. Sinha

Sinha first met Mahatma Gandhi in 1916 at Central Hindu College, Benares. He gave up practising law in 1921 to take part in Gandhi's non-cooperation movement.

He was arrested for the first time in 1922 and Congress Seva Dal was declared illegal. For this he was known as Bihar Kesari. He was released from jail in 1923 and on the day of Tulsi Jayanti performed in the play Bharat Darshan at Central School, Kharagpur. In the same year he became member of the All India Congress Committee.

In 1927 Sinha became a member of the Legislative Council and in 1929 became General Secretary of the Bihar Pradesh Congress Committee (BPCC). In 1930, he participated in the Namak Satyagrah at Garhpura. He suffered severe scalding injuries to his hands and chest while being arrested, was imprisoned for six months and then was again arrested and imprisoned for two years during the civil disobedience movement. He was released after the Gandhi–Irwin Pact and again started with his nationalist work and work with the Kisan Sabha. On 9 January 1932 he was sentenced to two years of rigorous imprisonment and a fine of Rs. 1,000. He was released from Hazaribagh Jail in October 1933. He was involved in relief and rehabilitation after the 1934 Nepal–Bihar earthquake. He was the President of Munger Zila Parishad from 1934 to 1937. In 1935, he was elected President of the Bihar Provincial Congress Committee in 1935 and 1953. He was elected to the Central Legislature in 1935–36. Shri Sinha was elected to the Bihar Legislature Assembly in 1935, 1946, 1952 and 1957 and re-elected leader of the Congress Legislature Party in all the three successive terms.

Sinha was also the President of the BPCC in 1936 with A.N. Sinha as his deputy, a member of its working committee and the two held the positions for over thirty years.

On 20 July 1937, he became the Premier of Bihar province when Congress came to power. Under the Government of India Act of 1935, Sinha formed his Cabinet at Patna on 20 July 1937. He and his colleague A.N. Sinha disagreed with the governor on the issue of the release of political prisoners and resigned. The then-governor had to accede to the demands for release of prisoners from Cellular Jail (Kalapani) and the Bihar Tenancy Act was reformed in favour of peasants. They then resumed office. But they again resigned in 1939, as did all Congress chief ministers, over the question of involving India in the Second World War without the consent of the Indian people. Along with A.N. Sinha, the first deputy chief minister cum finance minister of Bihar, he is considered by some to be one of the makers of modern Bihar.

Sinha opposed the caste system in India. In 1940 Gandhi described him as "the first Satyagrahi" of Bihar while A.N. Sinha was the second. He was jailed for nine months (22 November 1940 – 26 August 1941). During the Quit India movement, which started in 1942, he was arrested on 10 August. He was released in 1944 from Hazaribagh jail after he became seriously ill. In the same year his wife died at Prince of Wales Medical College.

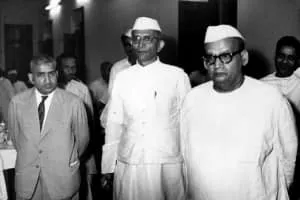
Shri Krishna Singh with Morarji Desai at constituent assembly of India

As the former chief minister of Bihar he attended the Simla Conference and also became a member of the Constituent Assembly of India, which framed the Constitution of India.

Sinha served Bihar continuously from 1946 until his death on 31 January 1961 at the age of 73. In 1978, the Ministry of Culture established a science museum called the Srikrishna Science Centre. The largest conference hall in Patna, Shri Krishna Memorial Hall is also named after him.

== Tenure as Chief minister ==
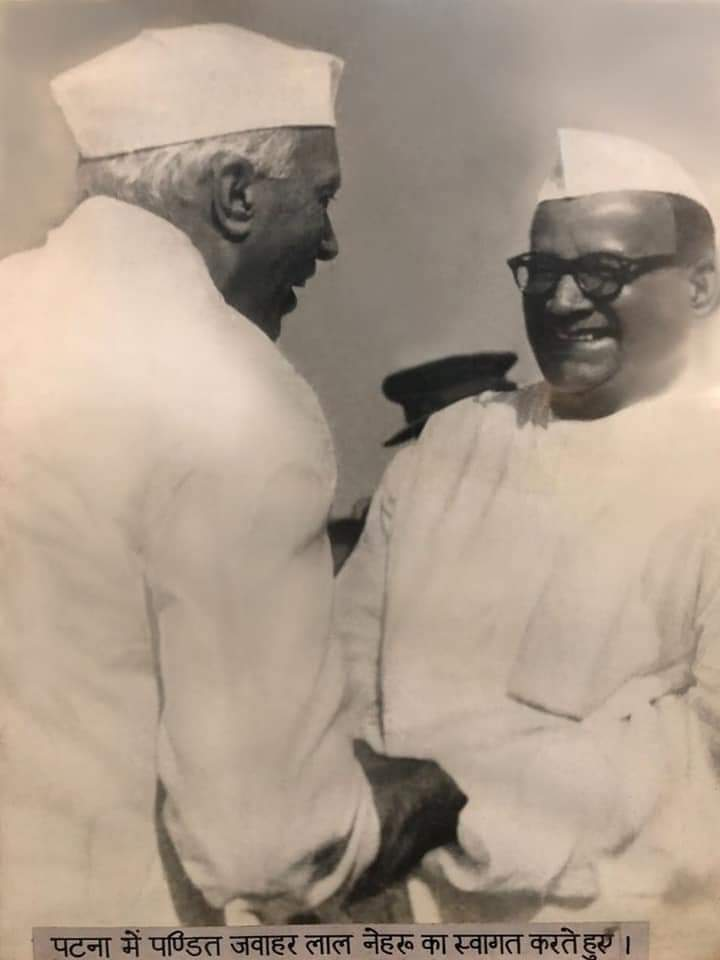
Shri Krishna Sinha meeting Jawaharlal Nehru

His tenure, spanning over 14 years after India's independence, was marked by transformative reforms and progressive governance that laid the foundation for modern Bihar. Shri Babu was a strong advocate of social justice, education, and economic development. One of his most notable achievements was the abolition of the zamindari system, which aimed to end feudal landholding practices and redistribute land to the poor and marginalised farmers. This monumental reform brought significant relief to the rural populace and contributed to reducing socio-economic inequalities in the state.

During his tenure, Shri Krishna Singh prioritised educational development and played a vital role in establishing several educational institutions to promote literacy and higher learning. He worked tirelessly to ensure access to education for underprivileged and marginalised communities, which was a significant step towards social equality. Shri Babu also championed industrial development in Bihar, laying the groundwork for large-scale industrial projects such as the Barauni Refinery and the Heavy Engineering Corporation in Ranchi. These initiatives boosted employment and contributed to Bihar's economic growth. Under Singh's tenure, the Barauni Fertilizer Plant and Sindri Fertilizer Plant were indeed established and became important for agricultural development in the region.

He played a role in the planning stages for the development of Bokaro as an industrial hub. The Bokaro Steel Plant, however, was established later, in the 1960s, under the leadership of his successors. Nevertheless, his support for industrialisation in the region set the foundation for Bokaro's later development. Bihar, which has significant coal reserves, was central to India's coal production during this period. Shri Krishna Singh’s government did push for the development of the state's coal resources, particularly in regions like Jharia and Hazaribagh, to fuel industrial projects. He was indeed supportive of the Damodar Valley Corporation (DVC), which was established in 1948 to manage the Damodar River basin's resources. This project was focused on flood control, irrigation, and electricity generation. Shri Krishna Singh advocated for projects like these to aid Bihar's economic growth.

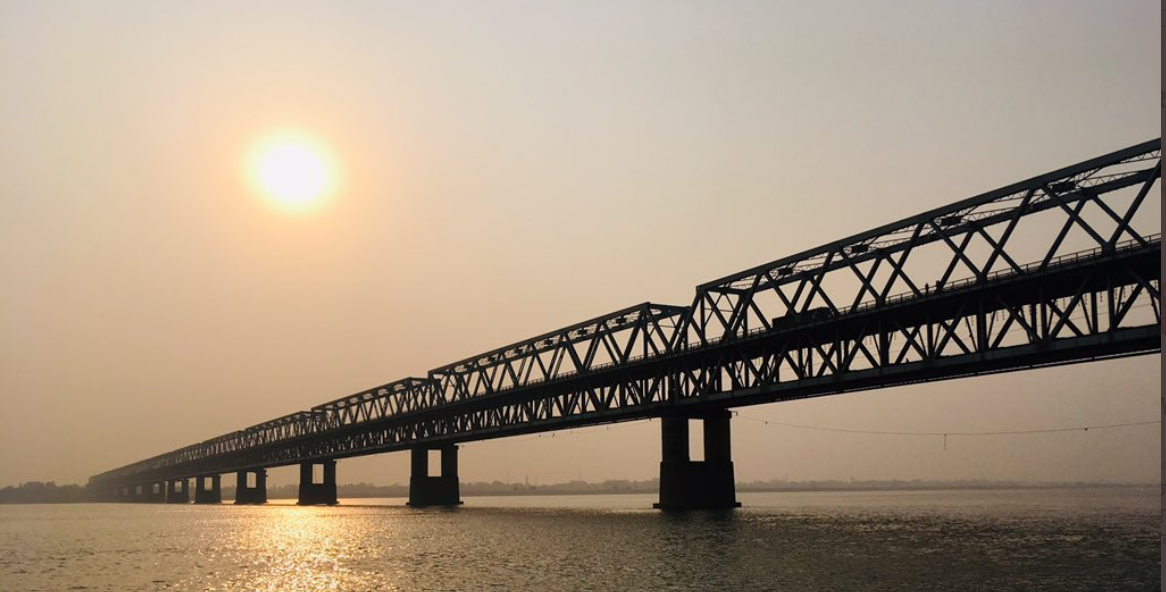
Rajendra Setu, inaugurated in 1959

During his tenure as Chief Minister, Shri Krishna Singh envisioned the development of an industrial corridor through Begusarai, Bakhtiyarpur, and Fatuha. To facilitate this vision, he oversaw the construction of Rajendra Setu, the first railroad bridge on the Ganges in independent India, completed in Mokama-Simaria in 1959. This landmark infrastructure project played a pivotal role in boosting connectivity and industrial growth in Bihar.

Shri Krishna Singh was a staunch supporter of Mahatma Gandhi's principles and worked to eradicate untouchability and caste discrimination. He actively implemented policies to uplift Dalits and backward classes, ensuring their greater participation in social, economic, and political spheres. His government also initiated welfare measures for farmers, labourers, and industrial workers, solidifying his reputation as a leader dedicated to the people's welfare.

As a leader, Shri Babu was admired for his administrative acumen, integrity, and unwavering commitment to public service. His visionary leadership transformed Bihar into a progressive state and earned him the title "Bihar Kesari" (Lion of Bihar). Shri Krishna Singh's tenure as Chief Minister is remembered as a period of significant progress, social reform, and economic transformation in Bihar's history.

== Death and legacy ==
Shri Krishna Singh, affectionately known as Shri Babu, died on 31 January 1961, in Patna, Bihar, India. His death marked the end of a significant era in Bihar's political history, as he had been the state's first Chief Minister, serving from 1946 until his demise.

A unanimous resolution was adopted at Sadaqat Ashram, Patna, by senior Congress leaders, including Meira Kumar, Nikhil Kumar, and others, urging the conferment of the Bharat Ratna on Shri Krishna Singh for his contributions to Bihar’s social and economic development. Leaders from other parties, including the BJP, and the Bihar government in 2021 have also supported this demand, recognising his enduring legacy as a reformist and visionary leader.

== See also ==
- List of chief ministers of Bihar
- Rati Lal Prasad Verma
- Ramdeo Mahto
- Ajit Kumar Mehta
- Aklu Ram Mahto
- Dev Dyal Kushwaha
- Upendra Nath Verma
- Sumitra Devi
- Chandradeo Prasad Verma
- Sahdeo Mahato
