= Purantand =

Purantand is a village in Lalganj Block, Vaishali district in the Indian state of Bihar.

It is situated 8 km away from sub-district headquarter Lalganj and 28 km away from district headquarter Hajipur. As per 2009 stats, Purantand is the gram panchayat of Purantand village. Purantand has a total population of 1000 peoples. There are about 110 houses in Purantand village. Bhagwanpur station is nearest railway station to Purantand which is approximately 5 km away.

| Gram Panchayat : | PuranTand |
| Block / Tehsil : | Lalganj |
| District : | Vaishali |
| State : | Bihar |
| Pincode : | 844123 |
| Area : | 49 hectares |
| Population : | 1000 |
| Households : | 110 |
| Nearest Town : | Lalganj (10 km) |
