= Aurangabad, Bihar Lok Sabha constituency =

Parliamentary constituency in Bihar, India

Coordinates: 24.8°N 84.4°E

Aurangabad
- Lok Sabha constituency

Constituency details
- Country: India
- Region: East India
- State: Bihar
- Assembly constituencies: Kutumba; Aurangabad; Rafiganj; Gurua; Imamganj; Tikari
- Established: 1952
- Reservation: None

Member of Parliament
- 18th Lok Sabha
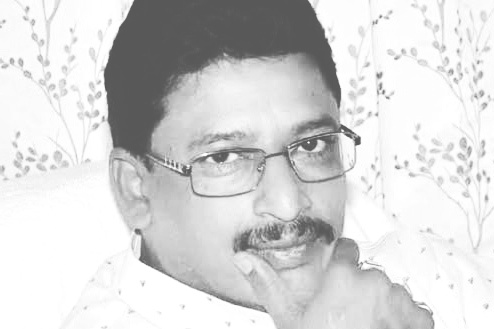
- Incumbent Abhay Kushwaha
- Party: RJD
- Alliance: INDIA
- Elected year: 2024

The Aurangabad Lok Sabha constituency is one of the 40 Lok Sabha (parliamentary) constituencies in Bihar state in eastern India. Between 1952 and 2019, the constituency elected candidates belonging to only Rajput caste to Lok Sabha. From 1989 to 2019, the constituency remained the space for political battle between the families of Satyendra Narayan Singh and Ram Naresh Singh. In 2024, Abhay Kushwaha defeated Sushil Kumar Singh, son of Ram Naresh Singh to become first Kushwaha parliamentarian from the constituency.

== Assembly segments ==
Presently, Aurangabad Lok Sabha constituency comprises the following six Vidhan Sabha (legislative assembly) segments:

#	Name	District	Member	Party	2024 lead
222	Kutumba (SC)	Aurangabad	Lalan Ram	HAM(S)	RJD
223	Aurangabad	Aurangabad	Trivikram Singh	BJP	RJD
224	Rafiganj	Aurangabad	Pramod Singh	JD(U)	RJD
225	Gurua	Gaya	Upendra Prasad	BJP	RJD
227	Imamganj (SC)	Gaya	Deepa Manjhi	HAM(S)	RJD
231	Tikari	Gaya	Ajay Kumar	RJD	RJD

== Members of Parliament ==
The following is the list of the Members of Parliament elected from this constituency, the first Member of Parliament from the constituency was eminent freedom fighter Shri Satyendra Narain Singh.

Year	Name	Party
1952	Satyendra Narayan Sinha	Indian National Congress
1957	Satyendra Narayan Sinha	Indian National Congress
1961^	Ramesh Prasad Singh	Indian National Congress
1962	Maharani Lalita Rajya Lakshmi	Swatantra Party
1967	Mudrika Sinha	Indian National Congress
1971	Satyendra Narayan Sinha	Indian National Congress (O)
1977	Satyendra Narayan Sinha	Janata Party
1980	Satyendra Narayan Sinha	Janata Party
1984	Satyendra Narayan Sinha	Indian National Congress
1989	Ram Naresh Singh	Janata Dal
1991	Ram Naresh Singh	Janata Dal
1996	Virendra Kumar Singh	Janata Dal
1998	Sushil Kumar Singh	Samata Party
1999	Shyama Singh	Indian National Congress
2004	Nikhil Kumar	Indian National Congress
2009	Sushil Kumar Singh	Janata Dal (United)
2014	Sushil Kumar Singh	Bharatiya Janata Party
2019	Sushil Kumar Singh	Bharatiya Janata Party
2024	Abhay Kushwaha	Rashtriya Janata Dal

^ by poll

== Election results ==
=== 2024 ===
2024 Indian general elections: Aurangabad
Party	Candidate	Votes	%	±%
RJD	Abhay Kushwaha	465,567	49.22	▲11.1
BJP	Sushil Kumar Singh	3,86,456	40.86	▼4.97
BSP	Sunesh Kumar	20,309	2.15	▼1.46
NOTA	None of the Above	22,627	2.39	
Majority		79,111		
Turnout		9,46,044	50.43	▼3.24
RJD gain from BJP		Swing		

Detailed Results at: https://results.eci.gov.in/PcResultGenJune2024/ConstituencywiseS0437.htm

(#): Joint candidate (HAM(S) in MGB in 2019)

=== 2019 ===
2019 Indian general elections: Aurangabad, Bihar
Party	Candidate	Votes	%	±%
BJP	Sushil Kumar Singh	431,541	45.83	+6.67
HAM(S)	Upendra Prasad	3,58,934	38.12	
BSP	Naresh Yadav	34,033	3.61	
NOTA	None of the Above	22,632	2.4	+0.18
Majority		72,607	7.61	
Turnout		9,35,469	53.67	
BJP hold		Swing		

=== General elections 2014 ===
2014 Indian general elections: Aurangabad, Bihar
Party	Candidate	Votes	%	±%
BJP	Sushil Kumar Singh	307,941	39.16	
INC	Nikhil Kumar	2,41,594	30.72	
JD(U)	Bagi Kumar Verma	1,36,137	17.31	
BSP	Santosh Kumar	27,833	3.54	
NOTA	None of the Above	17,454	2.22	
Majority		66,347	7.71	
Turnout		7,86,274	51.19	
BJP gain from JD(U)		Swing		

=== General Elections 2009 ===
2009 Indian general elections: Aurangabad, Bihar
Party	Candidate	Votes	%	±%
JD(U)	Sushil Kumar Singh	260,153	43.48	
RJD	Shakil Ahmad Khan	1,88,095	31.44	
INC	Nikhil Kumar	54,581	9.12	
BSP	Archna Chandra	45,173	7.55	
Majority		72,058	12.04	
Turnout		5,98,309	43.47	
JD(U) gain from INC		Swing		

== See also ==
- Aurangabad district
- List of constituencies of the Lok Sabha
