= Anugrah Narayan Sinha =

Indian politician (1887–1957)

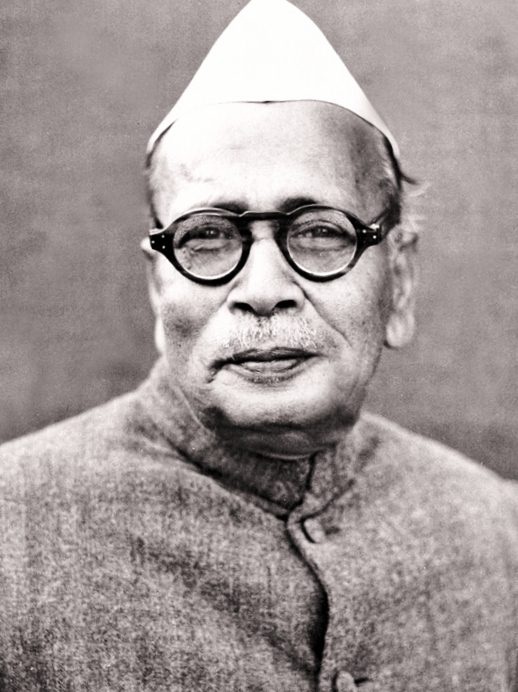

1st Deputy Chief Minister of Bihar and Finance Minister of Bihar
- In office 2 April 1946 – 5 July 1957
- Chief Minister: Sri Krishna Sinha
- Preceded by: Position Created
- Succeeded by: Vacant

Member Of Constituent Assembly
- In office 9 December 1946 – 26 January 1950
- Preceded by: Post Created
- Succeeded by: Post Abolished
- Constituency: Aurangabad

Deputy Premier and Finance Minister of Bihar Province
- In office 20 July 1937 – 31 October 1939
- Preceded by: Position established
- Succeeded by: Governor's rule

Member Central Legislative Council
- In office 1926–1930
- Governor General: The Earl of Halifax
- Preceded by: Maharaja Rameshwar Singh
- Succeeded by: Vacant

Member Central Legislative Assembly
- In office 1923–1926
- Governor General: The Earl of Reading
- Preceded by: Ambika Prasad Sinha
- Succeeded by: Badri Lal Rastogi

Personal details
- Born: 18 June 1887 Poiwan, Bengal Presidency, British India
- Died: 5 July 1957 (aged 70) Patna, Bihar, India
- Party: Indian National Congress
- Children: 2
- Education: University of Patna; Presidency College, Kolkata
- Occupation: Lawyer; Nationalist; Statesman; Educationist; Administrator
- Nickname: Bihar Vibhuti
- MERAY SANSMARAN
- As of 12 July, 2006

Anugrah Narayan Sinha (18 June 1887 – 5 July 1957), known as Bihar Vibhuti, was an Indian nationalist politician, participant in Champaran Satyagraha, Gandhian, and one of the architects of modern Bihar. He served as the first Deputy Chief Minister and the Finance Minister of the Indian state of Bihar from 1946 to 1957. He was also a member of the Constituent Assembly of India, which was elected to write the Constitution of India and served in its first Parliament as an independent nation. He also held a range of portfolios including Labour, Local Self Government, Public Works, Supply & Price Control, Health and Agriculture. A.N. Sinha, affectionately called Anugrah Babu, was a close associate of Mahatma Gandhi during the freedom movement and worked with Bihar Kesari Sri Krishna Sinha to lead the Gandhian movement in Bihar. One of the leading nationalists in the Indian independence movement from Bihar after Dr Rajendra Prasad, he was elected as the Congress Party deputy leader in the state assembly to assume office as the first Deputy Chief Minister cum Finance Minister of independent Bihar, and re-elected when the Congress Party won Bihar's first general election with a massive mandate in 1952.

== Early life ==
He was born to Visveshwar Dayal Singh on 18 June 1887 in a family of Poiwan village of the former Gaya district (later Aurangabad) in Bihar in the Rajput caste. His younger son Satyendra Narayan Sinha became chief minister of Bihar.

He became the Secretary of the Bihar Students Conference founded by Rajendra Prasad and the Chanakya Society of the Patna College. In 1915 he was appointed professor of history at the T.N.B. college in Bhagalpur where he remained until 1916.

== Freedom movement ==
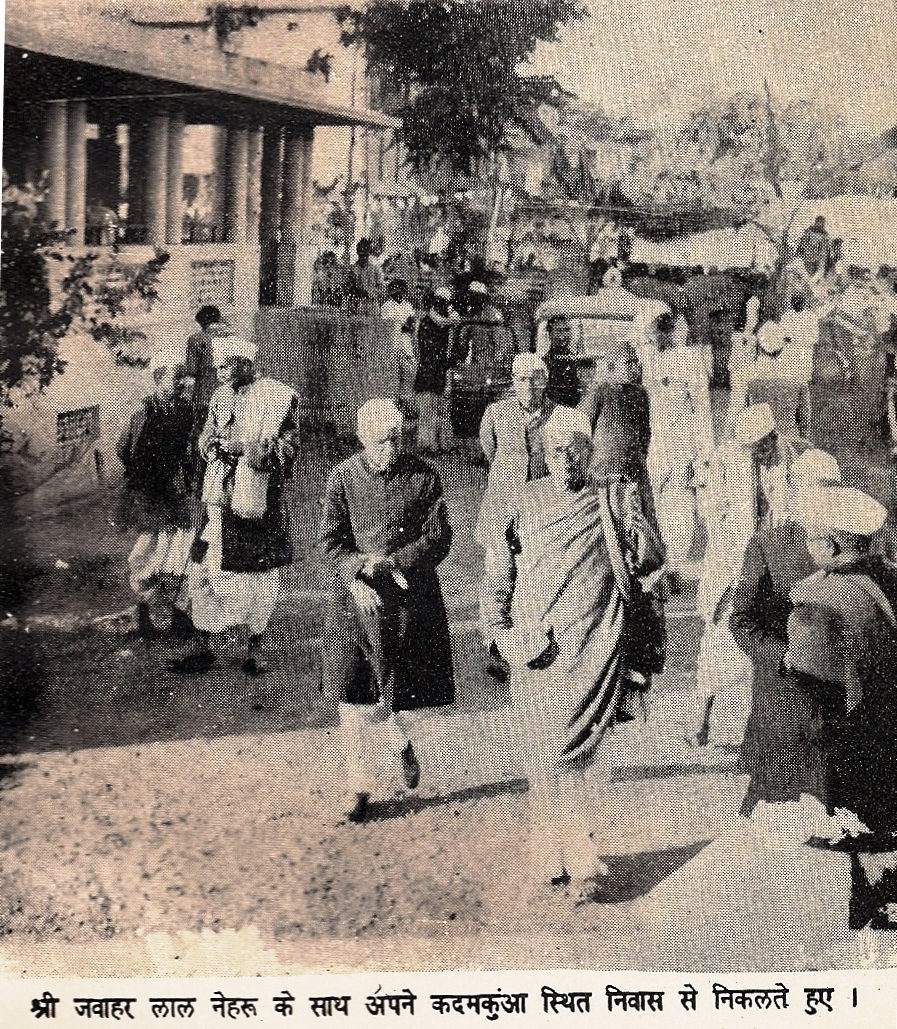
(LtoR)Rajendra Prasad, Jawaharlal Nehru, Anugrah Narayan Sinha and Sri Krishna Sinha at Anugrah Babu's residence

In 1917, heeding the call of Mahatma Gandhi to the nation, he left his flourishing law practice to join the Champaran Satyagraha movement. The Champaran experiment formed a vital chapter in the development of the Gandhian method in India and he was catapulted to the national stage. He served as a teacher in Bihar Vidyapeeth founded by Rajendra Prasad for motivating young meritorious youths. Among his first students was young Jayprakash Narayan. In 1922 he organised the Gaya Congress. In the following year he became one of the General Secretaries of the All India Congress Committee (AICC). When Rajendra Prasad was elected Chairman of Patna Municipality, Sinha was elected Vice-Chairman. As he was soon elected Chairman of the Gaya District Board, he resigned. He was the pivotal force behind the Civil Disobedience Movement led by M K Gandhi, in the year 1930 which is considered an important milestone in the history of Indian Nationalism.

His patriotism earned him 15 months of rigorous imprisonment in 1933–34. When the M8 Nepal–Bihar earthquake occurred on 15 January 1934, Bihar Central Relief Committee was set up on 17 January 1934, under the Presidency of Rajendra Prasad and Sinha became its Vice-President. He took the task of raising funds to help the people and the relief and rehabilitation work was organised in an elaborate and efficient manner. He was elected as a member of the Central Council in 1935 from Sahabad-cum-Patna Constituency with a massive margin. He became a member of the Bihar Legislative Assembly in 1936. In the provincial autonomy granted by British, under the Government of India Act of 1935, the first Congress ministry was sworn in on 20 July 1937 and he became the Deputy Premier cum Finance Minister of Bihar province. He and Premier Sri Krishna Sinha disagreed with the then Governor Maurice Garnier Hallett on the issue of the release of political prisoners and both resigned. The Governor had to give in and they again resumed their offices. But they again resigned in 1939, as did all Congress governments in the country, over the question of involving India in the Second World War without the consent of the Indian people.

He was among the first freedom fighters to respond to Gandhiji's call for Satyagraha in 1940–41. He was arrested by the British authorities and imprisoned in the Hazaribagh Central Jail in 1942. In 1944 he was released and devoted himself to serving the epidemic-ridden people.

After independence he dedicated himself to the all round development of Bihar as Finance Minister and as the Deputy Chief Minister of Bihar.

== Exemplary government ==
The first Bihar Government, both in 1937 and 1946, was characterised by the values of the Mahatma Gandhi. Its two eminent leaders Shri Krishna Sinha and Anugrah Babu were nationalists of unimpeachable integrity and great public spirit. They ran an exemplary government in Bihar. Almost all the development projects needed for the state of Bihar were done by the leadership pair of Shri Krishna Sinha and Anugrah Narayan Sinha. It included several river valley projects right from Koshi, Aghaur and Sakri to other such river projects. The first five-year plan period was given to the development in rural development works mainly in the agricultural sector. In fact, Bihar became the top state in the country's first five-year plan and it was announced by Sinha in the assembly. The then Prime Minister of India Jawaharlal Nehru sent Paul H. Appleby to assess the administration in states and in his famous report, he described Bihar as the best governed state in India mostly due to the excellent leadership of Shri Krishna Sinha and Anugrah Narayan Sinha.

Since the second five-year plan period, Sinha spearheaded the process of rapid industrialisation of Bihar and bought several industries for the all round development of the state. He served India's international interests. He successfully led the Indian Food and Agriculture delegation to Nepal and also the Indian delegation to the International Labour Organization (ILO) in Canada and Switzerland. He also actively led a number of Government and voluntary organisations in India and abroad.

== Political legacy ==
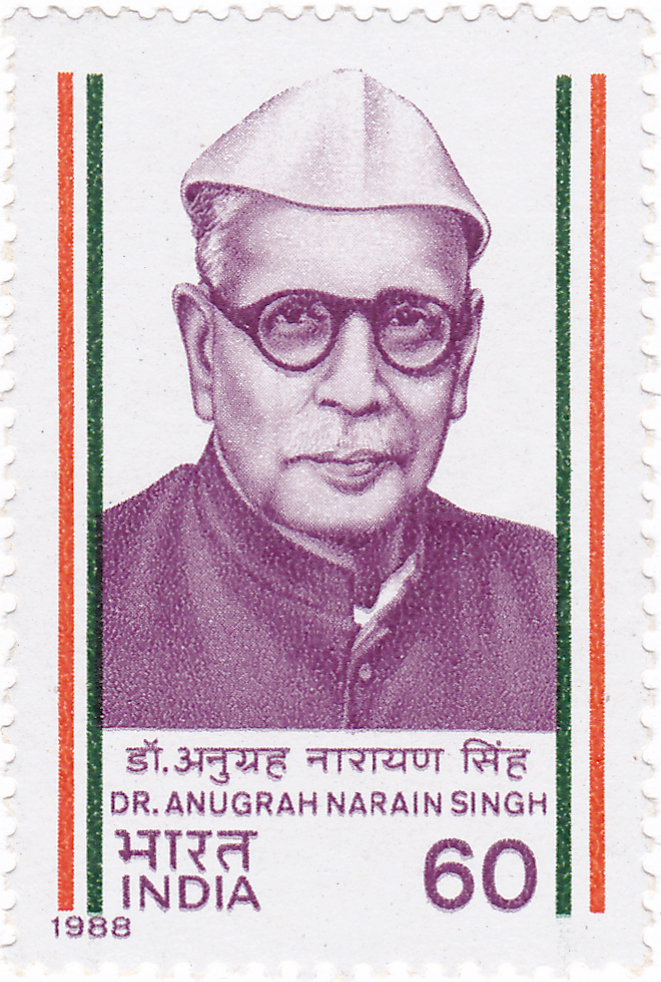
Anugrah Narayan Singh on a 1988 stamp of India

Along with nationalist Rajendra Prasad and his close colleague in the Indian independence movement Shri Krishna Sinha, the first Chief Minister of Bihar, Anugrah Narayan Sinha is considered one of the architects of modern Bihar. His younger son Satyendra Narayan Singh (who was affectionately called "Chhote Saheb") also became a prominent freedom fighter and later became Chief Minister of Bihar. His grandson Nikhil Kumar, a former IPS, has served as the Governor of Kerala. Sinha served the state continuously, barring war years (Second World War 1939–1945), as the Deputy Chief Minister cum Finance Minister from the time of the first Congress Ministry in 1937 till his death on 5 July 1957. Lok Nayak Jayaprakash Narayan served as the Chairman of Anugraha Smarak Nidhi (Anugrah Memorial Fund). The Department of Posts released a commemorative stamp in his memory. The 125th birth anniversary of Anugrah Babu was also celebrated by a state level committee headed by Bihar Chief Minister Nitish Kumar. In 2013, various programmes were organised throughout the year in Bihar and biographies of Shri babu and Anugrah Babu were included in the school syllabus.

== See also ==
- My Autobiography, Or The Story Of My Experiments With Truth (1929) by M.K. Gandhi
- List of politicians from Bihar

== Resources ==
- Anugrah Narayan Sinha, Meray Sansmaran, an autobiography
- Anugrah Abhinandan Granth samiti. 1947 Anugrah Abhinandan Granth. Bihar.
- Anugrah Narayan Centenary Year Celebration Committee. 1987. Bihar Bibhuti : Vayakti Aur Kriti, Bihar.
- A.J. Philip, A gentleman among politicians
- Dr. Rajendra Prasad, Dr. Rajendra Prasad, Correspondence and Select Documents
- R. R. Diwakar, Bihar Through The Ages
- Bihar State Archives, Documentaries and Articles on Dr. A N Sinha
- Bameshwar Singh, Congress ministries under the High Command shadow,1988
- Bimal Prasad (editor). 1980. A Revolutionary's Quest: Selected Writings of Jayaprakash Narayan. Oxford University Press, Delhi.
- P. S. Appu, The All India Services: Decline, Debasement and Destruction
