= Binodanand Jha =

Indian politician

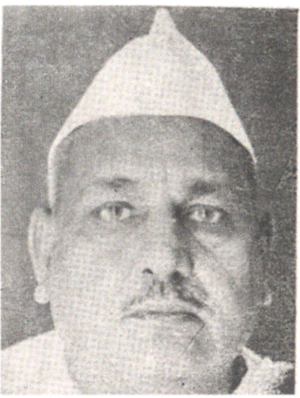

3rd Chief Minister of Bihar
- In office 18 February 1961 – 2 October 1963
- Preceded by: Deep Narayan Singh
- Succeeded by: K. B. Sahay

Member of Parliament, Lok Sabha
- In office 1971-1972
- Preceded by: Satya Narayan Sinha
- Succeeded by: Lalit Narayan Mishra
- Constituency: Darbhanga, Bihar

Personal details
- Born: 17 April 1900 Deoghar, Bengal Presidency, British India (present-day Jharkhand, India)
- Died: 1971 (aged 70-71)
- Party: Indian National Congress

Binodanand Jha (17 April 1900 – 1971), also known as Pandit Binodanand Jha, was an Indian politician originally from the district of Deoghar, Bihar (Baidyanathdham Deoghar), now in Jharkhand. He was educated at the Central Calcutta College, (now Maulana Azad College) of the University of Calcutta. He was the Chief Minister of Bihar from February 1961 to October 1963. He was elected to the 5th Lok Sabha, lower house of the Parliament of India, from the Darbhanga constituency of Bihar in 1971. He was a member of the Constituent Assembly of India in 1948 from Bihar.
