= Nikhil Kumar (governor) =

Indian politician (born 1941)

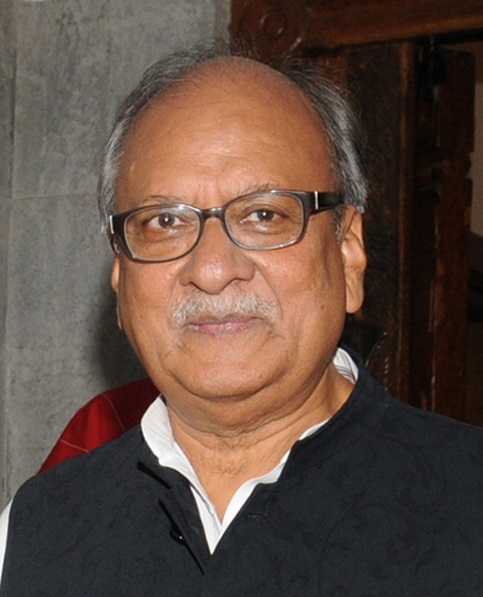
- Kumar in 2013

19th Governor of Kerala
- In office 23 March 2013 – 5 March 2014
- Chief Minister: Oommen Chandy
- Preceded by: Hansraj Bhardwaj
- Succeeded by: Sheila Dikshit

15th Governor of Nagaland
- In office 15 October 2009 – 21 March 2013
- Chief Minister: Neiphiu Rio
- Preceded by: Gurbachan Jagat
- Succeeded by: Ashwani Kumar

Member of Parliament, Lok Sabha
- In office 2004–2009
- Preceded by: Shyama Singh
- Succeeded by: Sushil Kumar Singh
- Constituency: Aurangabad, Bihar

Director-General of the NSG
- In office 30 June 1999 – 31 July 2001
- Preceded by: T. R. Kakkar
- Succeeded by: Gurbachan Jagat

Director-General of the ITBP
- In office 3 April 1997 – 3 December 1997
- Preceded by: B. B. Nandy
- Succeeded by: Gautam Kaul

Commissioner of Delhi Police
- In office January 1995 – April 1997
- Preceded by: M. B. Kaushal
- Succeeded by: T. R. Kakkar

Director of the BSF Academy
- In office July 1990 – December 1990
- Preceded by: D. K. Arya
- Succeeded by: P. Pillai

Personal details
- Born: 15 July 1941 (age 85) Vaishali, Bihar, British India
- Party: Indian National Congress
- Spouse: Shyama Singh (m. 1963)
- Education: Allahabad University
- Occupation: Civil servant; administrator; statesman; parliamentarian
- As of 26 September, 2006

Nikhil Kumar (born 15 July 1941) is a retired IPS officer and statesman from Bihar, India, who was Governor of Nagaland from 2009 to 2013 and Governor of Kerala from 2013 to 2014. One of country's well knownIPS officers of the 1963 batch from the AGMUT Cadre, Kumar also served as DGP of the National Security Guards, Indo-Tibetan Border Police, Railway Protection Force and Commissioner of Delhi Police. He was elected member of the 14th Lok Sabha of India from 2004 to 2009, representing the Aurangabad constituency in Bihar as a member of the Indian National Congress (INC) political party. He also served as the Chairman of the Parliamentary Committee on Information Technology.

== Family background ==
He is a son of Satyendra Narayan Sinha, who was Chief Minister of Bihar, a veteran Indian National Congress leader and a seven-term Member of Parliament, also from the constituency of Aurangabad.

His mother Kishori Sinha was MP for Vaishali and his wife Shyama Singh also represented Aurangabad in the Lok Sabha.

His grandfather Dr. Anugrah Narayan Sinha, known as Bihar Vibhuti, was the first Deputy Chief Minister cum Finance Minister of Bihar and an eminent Gandhian; his father "Chhote Saheb" was close in his later years to Jayaprakash Narayan and was one of the most prominent leaders of the anti-Emergency movement in Bihar and also the President of the Bihar wing of the Janata Party in 1977.

His brother-in-law is ex Rajya Sabha MP N. K. Singh, Chairman of 15th Finance Commission of India who has been among country's prominent bureaucrats and served as India's Revenue Secretary and also Principal Secretary to the Prime Minister.

== Civil service ==
He was educated at St. Xavier's High School, Patna and then at Allahabad University, where he earned an M.A. in Modern History. He entered the civil service in 1963 and was an Indian Police Service officer assigned to the erstwhile Union Territory of Delhi.

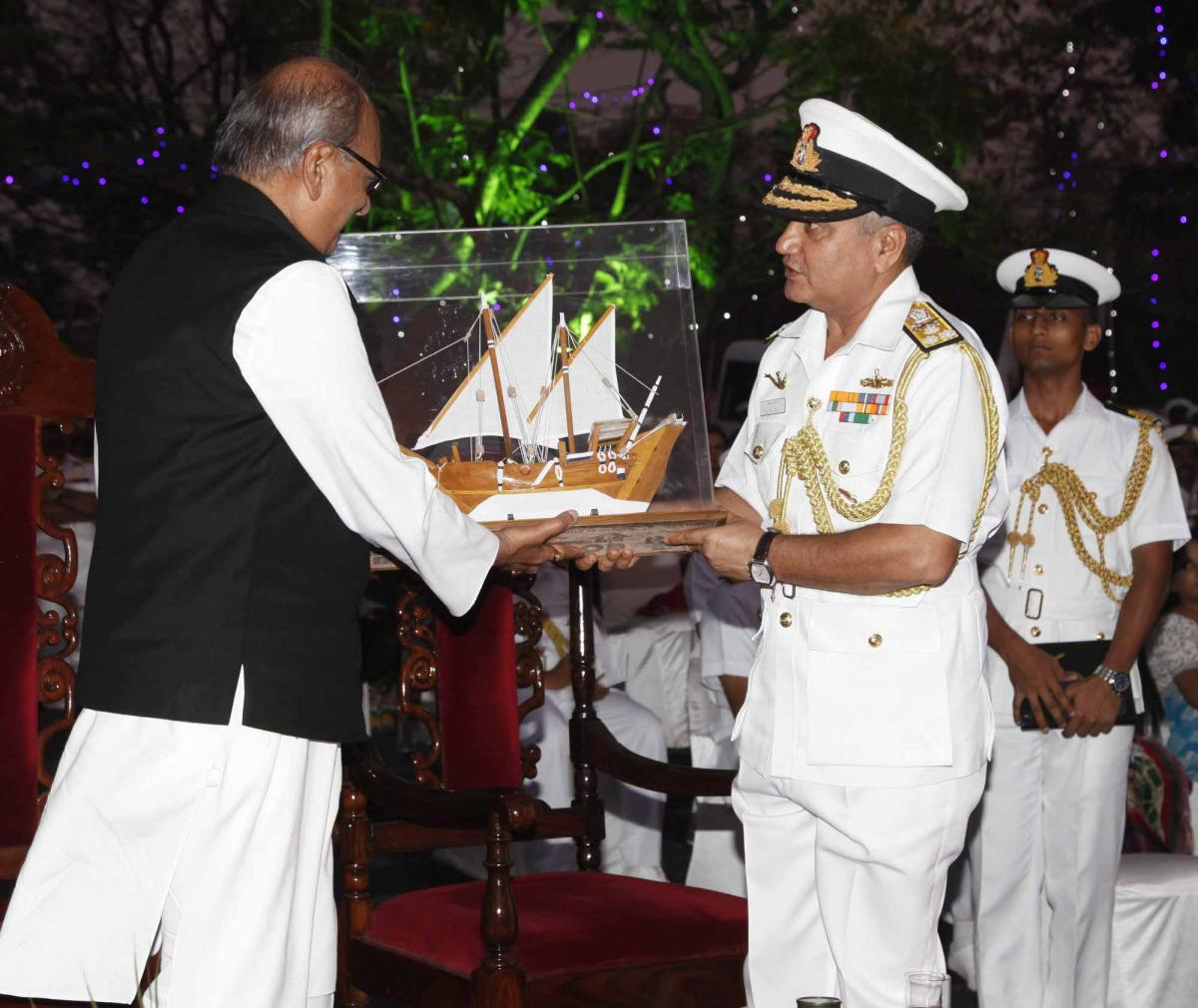
Vice Admiral Satish Soni presenting a memento to the state Governor Shri Nikhil Kumar

He held many important assignments and posts of national importance, in particular Additional Director General, Border Security Force (BSF) (1989–91; 1992–94), and Police Commissioner of New Delhi during 1995–97. In 1997-99 he became Special Secretary with charge of internal security at the Home Ministry. He also served as director-general of the Indo-Tibetan Border Police, and National Security Guards, a position he held till his retirement in July 2001. He was then appointed Member, National Security Advisory Board, Government of India (2001–03). He was awarded the Police Medal for Meritorious Service in 1977 and the President's Police Medal for Distinguished Service in 1985.

== Governor of Nagaland ==
He took the oath of office and secrecy as the Governor of Nagaland on 15 October 2009. He has been appointed a member of the Committee of Governors, constituted by the President of India to study and recommend measures for enhancing productivity, profitability, sustainability and competitiveness of the agriculture sector in India with special reference to rainfed area farming. He has been conferred with the prestigious Neelachakra Samman, during the national cultural festival Baisakhi Utsav at Jayadev Bhawan in Bhubaneswar.

== Governor of Kerala ==
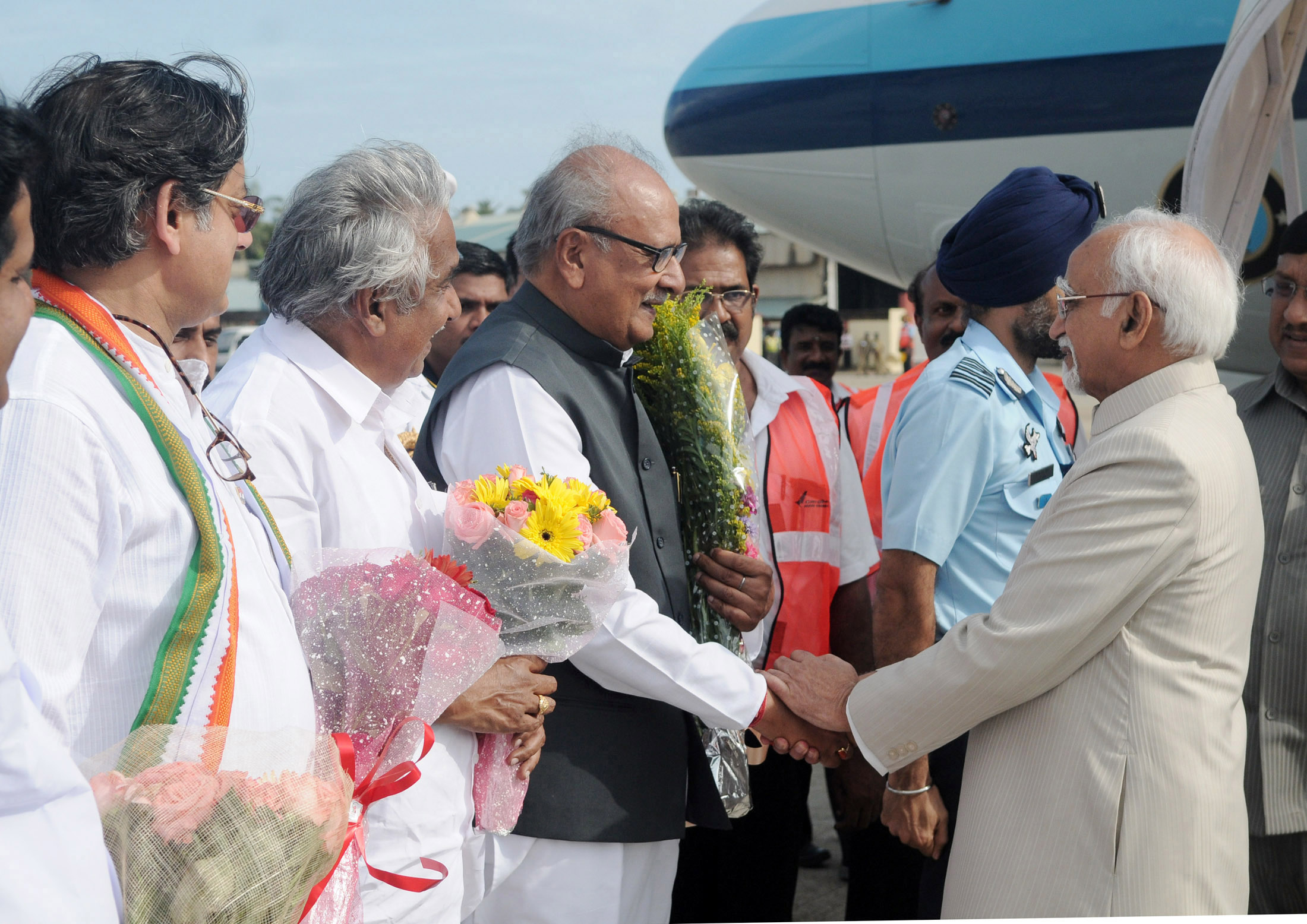
VP Hamid Ansari being received by Kumar upon his arrival at Thiruvananthapuram Airport along with the Chief Minister of Kerala Oommen Chandy

On 9 March 2013, President Pranab Mukherjee appointed Kumar as Governor of Kerala. During his tenure, Kumar was noted for his public engagement and extempore speaking on policy matters. He resigned on 4 March 2014 to contest the Lok Sabha elections from Aurangabad, Bihar.

== Positions held ==
- 1995-97: Commissioner of Police, Delhi (DGP rank)
- 1997: Director-General Indo-Tibetan Border Police (ITBP)
- 1997-99: Special Home Secretary (Internal Security), Government of India
- 1999-2001: Director-General National Security Guards
- 2001-03: Member, National Security Advisory Board, Government of India
- 2004-09: Elected to 14th Lok Sabha
- 2009-13: Governor of Nagaland
- 2013-14: Governor of Kerala

Government offices
Preceded by Hansraj Bhardwaj	Governor of Kerala; 23 March 2013 -4 March 2014	Succeeded by Sheila Dikshit
Preceded by Gurbachan Jagat	Governor of Nagaland; October 2009 – March 2013	Succeeded by Ashwani Kumar
