= Satyendra Narayan Sinha =

Indian politician (1917–2006)

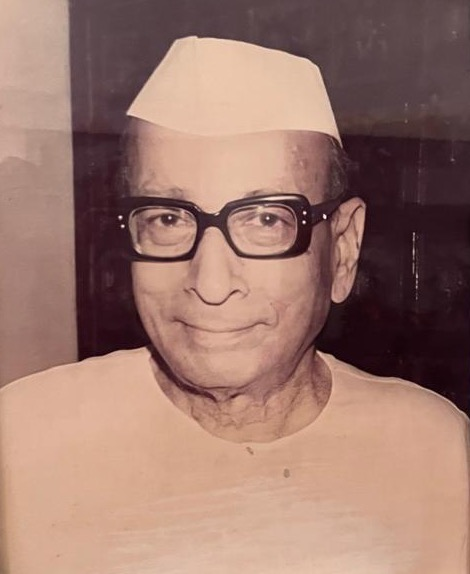

19th Chief Minister of Bihar
- In office 11 March 1989 – 6 December 1989
- Preceded by: Bhagwat Jha Azad
- Succeeded by: Jagannath Mishra

Education Minister of Bihar
- In office 18 February 1961 – 1 October 1963
- In office 1 October 1963 – 5 March 1967
- Chief Minister: Binodanand Jha, K.B.Sahay
- Preceded by: Acharya Badrinath Verma
- Succeeded by: Karpoori Thakur

President of International Committee on Violations of Human Rights in Parliamentarians
- In office 1977–1987
- Continent: Asia

Member of Provisional Parliament
- In office 26 January 1950 – 17 April 1952
- Prime Minister: Jawahar Lal Nehru
- State: Bihar
- Preceded by: position established
- Succeeded by: 1st Lok Sabha

Member of Parliament for Aurangabad
- In office 1952–1961
- Preceded by: position established
- Succeeded by: Ramesh Prasad Singh
- In office 1971–1989
- Preceded by: Mudrika Singh
- Succeeded by: Ram Naresh Singh

Agriculture Minister of Bihar
- In office 18 February 1961 – 1 October 1963
- In office 1 October 1963 – 5 March 1967
- Chief Minister: Binodanand Jha, K.B.Sahay

President, Bihar Janata Party
- In office 1973–1984
- National President: Chandra Shekhar
- Preceded by: Post Created
- Succeeded by: position abolished

Member of Bihar Legislative Assembly for Nabinagar (Aurangabad)
- In office 1962–1967
- In office 1967–1969
- Preceded by: Dr. Anugraha Narain Singh
- Succeeded by: Mahavir Pd. Akela

Member of Bihar Legislative Assembly for Gopalganj
- In office 1961–1962
- Preceded by: Kamala Rai
- Succeeded by: Abdul Ghafoor

Member of Bihar Legislative Council
- In office 20 July 1989 – 6 May 1990
- Preceded by: Vacant
- Constituency: elected by the Members of Bihar Legislative Assembly

Personal details
- Born: 12 July 1917 Poiwan, Bihar and Orissa Province, British India (now in Bihar, India)
- Died: 4 September 2006 (aged 89) Patna, Bihar, India
- Party: Indian National Congress (1940–1969,1984–2006); Indian National Congress-Organisation (1969–1977); Janata Party (1977–1984)
- Spouse: Smt. Kishori Sinha
- Children: Nikhil Kumar
- Education: Allahabad University University of Lucknow (LL.B., 1940)
- Nickname(s): Chhote Saheb, Satyendra Babu, SN Sinha

Satyendra Narayan Sinha (12 July 1917 – 4 September 2006) was an Indian politician and statesman, participant in the Indian independence movement, a leading light of Jaya Prakash Narayan's ‘complete revolution’ movement during the Emergency and a former Chief Minister of Bihar. Affectionately called Chhote Saheb, he was also a seven-time Member of Parliament from the Aurangabad constituency, a three-term Member of the Bihar Legislative Assembly, and a Member of the Bihar Legislative Council once. Regarded to be one of India's most influential regional people of the time, his reputation was synonymous with being a strict disciplinarian and tough taskmaster.

== Background ==
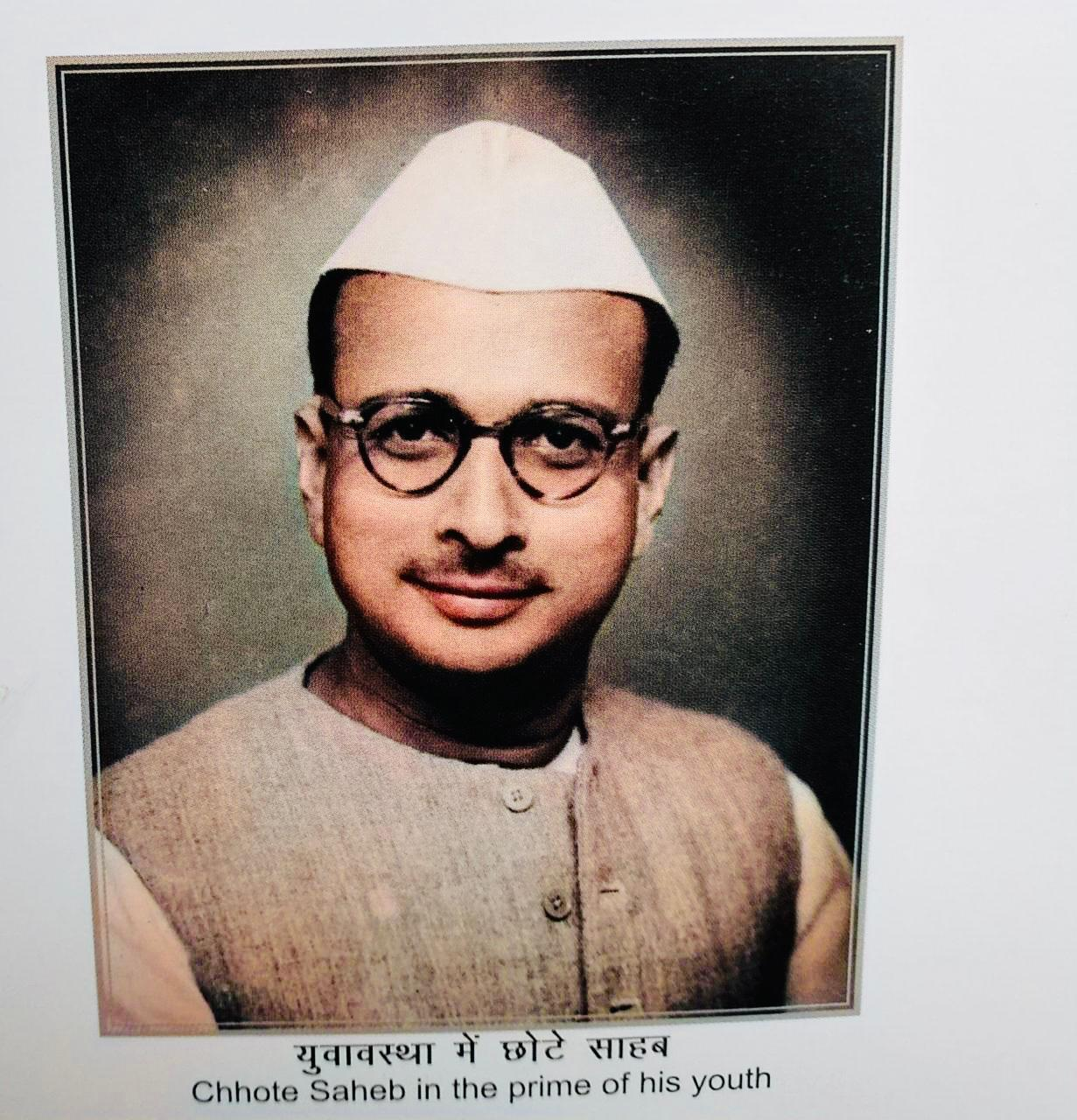
Shri S. N. Sinha, Hon’ble Member of India's Provisional Parliament

Sinha was born in an aristocratic political family in Poiwan, Aurangabad district, Bihar. He belonged to the Rajput caste. His father was a nationalist leader, Dr. Anugrah Narayan Sinha, who closely assisted Mahatma Gandhi along with Dr.Rajendra Prasad in the Champaran Satyagraha movement, the first satyagraha movement in the country and also served as the first Deputy Chief Minister cum Finance Minister of the Indian state of Bihar.

He spent his student years under the tutelage of Lal Bahadur Shastri at Allahabad. Brought up in a political environment, S. N. Sinha completed his bachelor's degree from Allahabad University and earned a degree in law from Lucknow University in 1940. He practised law at the Patna High Court, but left his job to join the Indian Independence movement and participated in the Quit India Movement in 1942. He organised Legal Aid Programmes for political prisoners during pre-Independence days.

== Political career ==
=== Provisional Parliament ===
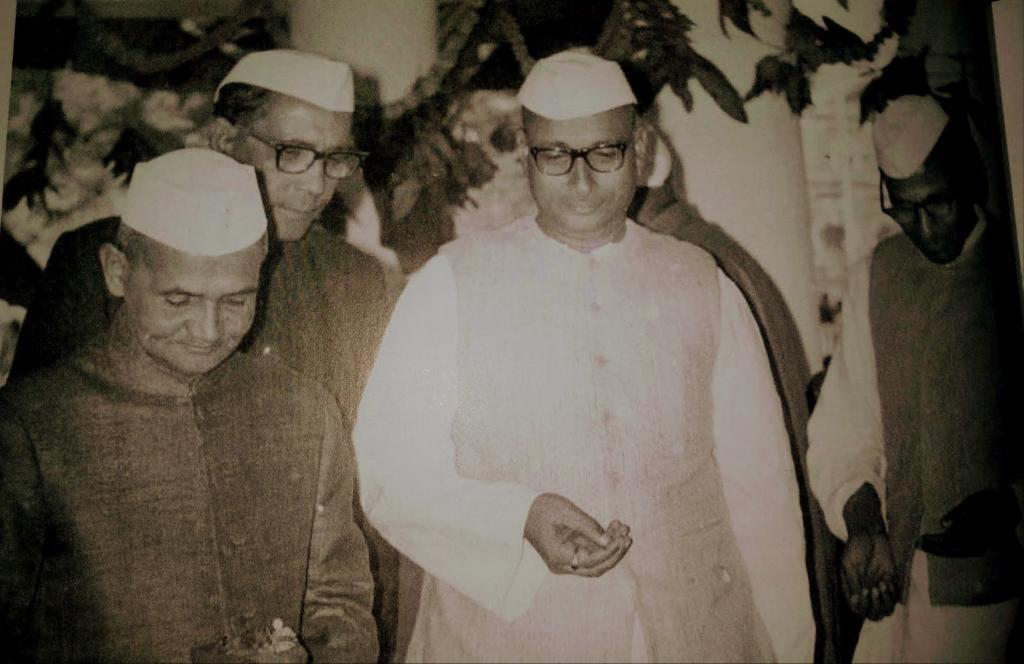
India's PM Shastri Ji & Bihar Education Minister SN Sinha during a public function

After Independence he was elected to the provisional Parliament from Bihar in 1950. He was part of the young Turk brigade of the Indian National Congress party during the time of the first Prime Minister of India Jawaharlal Nehru.

=== Bihar state politics ===
Satyendra Narayan Sinha was a prominent educationist, and served as the Education Minister of unified Bihar in the government headed by Chief Minister Pandit Binodanand Jha from 1961 to 1963, and again for two consecutive terms in the Cabinet of K. B. Sahay from 1963 to 1967. He also a held a range of portfolios including Local Self Government and Agriculture. He is credited with streamlining the entire education system of the Bihar state. As the state education minister, he played an instrumental role in the establishment of Magadh University in Bodh Gaya, in the year 1962. He occupied the second position (second-in-command) in the Cabinet and played the role of a de facto Chief Minister during the period 1961–1967 under the Governments headed by K. B. Sahay and Pandit Binodanand Jha. He had a unique political acumen to determine the electoral prospects of candidates in assembly election by just sitting at home in Patna.

=== The Kingmaker ===
S. N. Sinha also played a key role in the installation of Governments headed by chief ministers Krishana Ballabh Sahay, Satish Prasad Singh, B.P. Mandal, Sardar Harihar Singh, Bhola Paswan Shastri and Ram Sundar Das. He never hankered after power even when it was well within his reach. When Indira Gandhi became Prime Minister of India in 1966, she wanted him to become the next Chief Minister of Bihar and sent then External Affairs Minister Dinesh Singh to convey the proposal but he refused, since he did not wish to unseat incumbent CM K B Sahay but wanted to be elected by the people of the state.

=== Emergency era ===
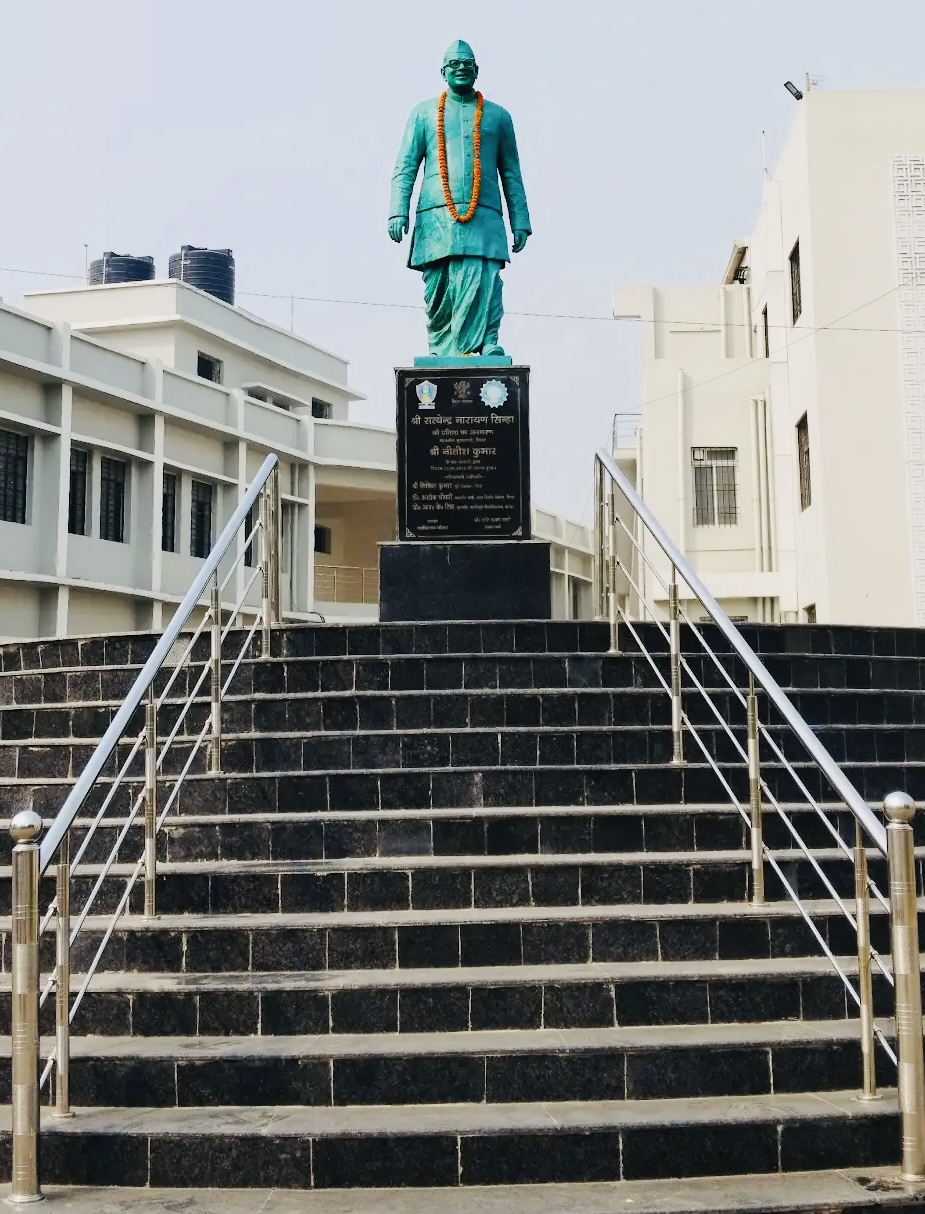
Statue of Shri SN Sinha inaugurated by Bihar Chief Minister Nitish Kumar at Patna

He decided to side with the syndicate after the expulsion of Smt.Indira Gandhi from the Congress.The Prime Minister of India, Indira Gandhi, declared a state of emergency on 25 June 1975 due to internal political disturbances. Accordingly, all fundamental rights enjoyed in the Indian Constitution were suspended. Political dissidents, newspaper reporters, opposition leaders who opposed emergency were jailed. Chhote Saheb, along with other prominent leaders, opposed this blatant misuse of state machinery. In 1977, during the emergency in India, he was made president of Bihar Janata Party and Chairman of State Election Committee.

"Chhote Saheb, as he was popularly called, was an important political leader of Bihar, a distinguished Parliamentarian, and someone who had the interests of his state and people uppermost in his mind. During his long public life of over six decades, Sinha Ji made significant contributions in streamlining the education system of Bihar."

— Vice President of India Hamid Ansari

He worked together with premier colleagues of Janata Party like Morarji Desai, Chandra Shekhar Singh, Atal Bihari Vajpayee, Lal Krishna Advani, Charan Singh, Jagjivan Ram, Bhairon Singh Shekhawat, Madhu Limaye, H. D. Deve Gowda, Inder Kumar Gujral, Raj Narain, George Fernandes and Karpuri Thakur and the movement was a grand success in Bihar. He motivated the youth and students to take an active role in politics, and ensured their representation in political affairs. During, the Bihar legislative assembly election 1977, a massive crowd of youth leaders and activists used to converge at his residence.

Satyendra Narayan Sinha's political encouragement to the youths led to the emergence of then youth leaders of Janata Party like Raghuvansh Prasad Singh, Nitish Kumar, Ram Vilas Paswan, Subodh Kant Sahay, Kripanath Pathak, Ram Jatan Sinha, Jagdish Sharma, Thakur Muneshwar Nath Singh, Raghupati Singh and Narendra Singh. After the emergency was lifted on 21 March 1977, fresh general elections were held in India.

The Congress Party, led by Indira Gandhi suffered a defeat at the hands of the Janata Party coalition of several small parties created in 1977 and the alliance came to power, headed by Morarji Desai, who became the first non-Congress Prime Minister of India. In Bihar, the Janata Party won all the fifty-four Lok Sabha seats in 1977 general elections under the mentorship of Jayaprakash Narayan and rose to power in Bihar assembly too. He struck by the Janata Party and preferred to be in opposition although he would have been considered a prize catch by the Congress party.

=== Return to Congress ===
He quit the party following differences with the then party president Chandra Shekhar Singh and returned to the Congress fold in 1984. The then Prime Minister of India Indira Gandhi came down to Patna to formally admit him back to the Congress party.

=== Chief Ministership ===
As the Chief Minister of Bihar, Chhote Saheb also held the portfolio of Education for the fourth term in his later years 1989–1990. In the same year, he conceived, the proposal to set up a NTPC's super thermal power project at Nabinagar in Bihar's Aurangabad district to then Prime Minister of India and Congress leader Rajiv Gandhi; but the project went into limbo as the following state governments failed to follow it. In 2007, Manmohan Singh's government finally put a stamp of approval on it.

"I believe in participative democracy and not dictatorial attitudes"

— Satyendra Narayan Sinha

" He was a great humanitarian and an educationist who changed the face of education in Bihar by his radical and innovative ideas that were far ahead of their time. The state owes a lot to him.."

— Nitish Kumar, Chief Minister of Bihar

He is also credited for the establishment of the Indira Gandhi Planetarium cum Science Centre in Patna. Under his regime, Panchayati Raj system of governance was introduced in Bihar.

In his autobiography Meri Yaadein, Meri Bhoolein, released by the then Bihar Governor Buta Singh in the presence of Defence Minister Pranab Mukherjee (also former President of India), He accused his state colleagues of "fanning" the 1989 Bhagalpur violence to malign him, specifically mentioning his predecessor and former chief minister Bhagwat Jha Azad and the former speaker Shivchandra Jha. He didn't agree with the over-ruling of his order to transfer the then superintendent of police K S Dwivedi who had failed miserably to discharge his duties. The decision was not only an encroachment of the Constitutional right of the state government but also a step detrimental to ongoing efforts to ease tensions. When he stepped down from the post of Chief Minister of Bihar, Jagannath Mishra succeeded him. He recalled when he met Prime Minister Rajiv Gandhi later on, he informed him about the "role of some Congress leaders" in the riots. The Prime Minister expressed surprise and said "so, the riots were motivated!"

=== Parliament of India ===
S. N. Sinha was elected as a Member of the First, Second and Fifth to Eighth Lok Sabhas from 1950 to 1961 and 1971—1989 representing Aurangabad parliamentary constituency of Bihar. He retains the record of maximum parliamentary election victories in Bihar, next only to the late Jagjivan Ram.

He served as the Chairman of Committee on Estimates from 1977 to 1979. He was also a Member of the Committee on Finance from 1950 to 1952; Committee on Estimates from 1956 to 1958 and thereafter during 1985–1986 and the Committee on Public Undertakings during 1982–83. He was a well-known social activist, and served as the Assistant Secretary to the Bihar Provincial Committee of the Kasturba Gandhi National Memorial Fund and Secretary to the Bihar Provincial Committee of the Gandhi National Memorial Fund. He was also associated with a number of educational and social institutions in different capacities. He was member, Senate and Syndicate of Patna University from 1946 to 1960 and Bihar University from 1958 to 1960.

== International activities ==
A widely travelled person, S. N. Sinha attended Inter-Parliamentary Union Conference, Helsinki, Finland in 1955. He was the leader of the cultural delegation to Kabul on the occasion of Jasan in 1963. He also led the Indian Parliamentary Delegation to the Spring Meetings of Inter-Parliamentary Council, Canberra in 1977 and also to its meeting at Lisbon in 1978. He was a member of the Indian Parliamentary Delegation to erstwhile USSR in 1976 and was elected a member of the Special Committee on Violations of Human Rights of Parliamentarians at Canberra in 1977 representing Asia. He was also elected President of that committee (conferred upon the status of a Union Cabinet Minister) and served as its Chief from 1977 to 1988.

=== Posts held ===
S.N. Sinha held the following posts in his political career:

- 1946–1960: Member, Senate and Syndicate, Patna University
- 1948: Secretary, Bihar Provincial Committee of the Gandhi National Memorial Fund
- 1950 : Member, Provisional Parliament
- 1950–1952: Member, Committee on Finance
- 1952 : Elected to 1st Lok Sabha
- 1956–1958: Member, Committee on Estimates
- 1957: Re-elected to 2nd Lok Sabha (2nd term)
- 1958–1960: Member, Senate and Syndicate, Bihar University
- 1961–1963: Member, Bihar legislative assembly
- 1961–1962: State Cabinet Minister, Education, Bihar
- 1961–1962: State Cabinet Minister, Local Self Government (additional charge), Bihar
- 1963: Leader of the cultural delegation to Kabul
- 1962–1963: State Cabinet Minister, Education, Bihar
- 1962–1963: State Cabinet Minister, Local Self Government (additional charge), Bihar
- 1963–1967: Member, Bihar legislative assembly
- 1963–1967: State Cabinet Minister, Education, Bihar
- 1963–1967: State Cabinet Minister, Local Self Government (additional charge), Bihar
- 1963–1967: State Cabinet Minister, Agriculture (additional charge), Bihar
- 1967–1969: Member, Bihar legislative assembly
- 1969–1977: President, Congress(O), Bihar
- 1971: Re-elected to 5th Lok Sabha (3rd term)
- 1976: Member, Indian Parliamentary Delegation to erstwhile USSR
- 1977–1980: President, Janata Party, Bihar
- 1977: Re-elected to 6th Lok Sabha (4th term)
- 1977: Member, Special Committee on Violations of Human Rights for Parliamentarians
- 1977–1988: President (Status of Union Cabinet Minister), Special Committee on Violations of Human Rights for Parliamentarians
- 1977: Leader, Indian Parliamentary Delegation to the Spring Meetings of Inter-Parliamentary Council, Canberra
- 1978: Leader, Indian Parliamentary Delegation to the Spring Meetings of Inter-Parliamentary Council, Lisbon
- 1977–1979: Chairman, Committee on Estimates
- 1980: Re-elected to 7th Lok Sabha (5th term)
- 1982–1983: Member, Committee on Public Undertakings
- 1984: Re-elected to 8th Lok Sabha (6th term)
- 1985–1986: Member, Committee on Estimates
- 1989–1990: Member, Bihar legislative council
- 1989–1990: Chief Minister, Bihar

== Personal life ==
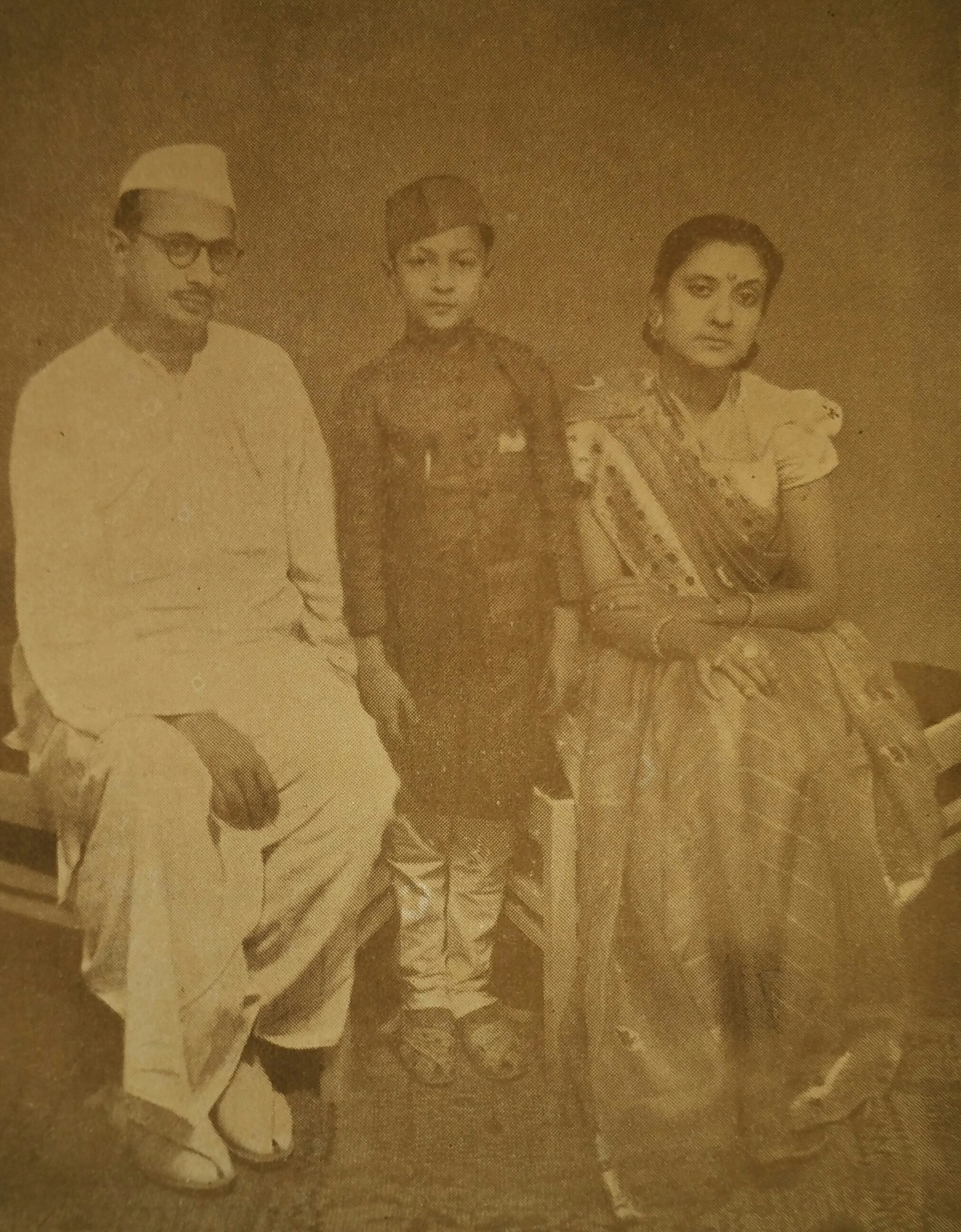
S. N. Sinha with Kishori Sinha & son Nikhil Kumar

S. N. Sinha's wife Kishori Sinha was a former Member of Parliament from Vaishali, and his daughter-in-law Shyama Singh is a former Member of Parliament from Aurangabad. His son, Nikhil Kumar, a former IPS official, has served as the Governor of the Indian state of Nagaland and also as the Governor of Kerala.

S. N. Sinha wrote his autobiography Meri Yadein: Meri Bhoolein, which incorporates the experiences and perceptions of a leader of his eminence and stature.

His official residence in Delhi, 28 Akbar Road, had won awards for being one of the best kept bungalows in the national capital. Its grand garden continually won awards at all Delhi's flower shows and was one of capital's landmark gardens.

== Criticism ==
The Congress government led by Sinha is criticised for the lackadaisical approach towards the handling of the 1989 Bhagalpur violence. The N.N Singh Committee report tabled in the Bihar legislative assembly held the government responsible for taking no action and the police showing complete inactivity during one of the biggest instances of human rights violations in Bihar, which led to the displacement of over 50,000 people. The riots are said to have claimed the lives of thousands of people, mostly poor weavers, while the police and Congress administration under Sinha took no action.

== Commemoration ==
The inaugural lecture of the annual Satyendra Narayan Sinha Memorial Lecture Series was delivered by Vice-President of India Shri Hamid Ansari in Patna. In 2014, the then Bihar CM announced to rename Magadh University of which Late Sinha was the founder as Satyendra Narayan Sinha Magadh University. The Children's Park in the capital Patna has now been rechristened as Satyendra Narayan Sinha Park and the foundation for installing a life-size statue of former Bihar CM was laid by Chief Minister Shri Nitish Kumar at a state function in 2015.

Preceded by Bhagwat Jha Azad	Chief Minister of Bihar; 1989–1990	Succeeded by Jagannath Mishra
