= Prabhu Dayal Singh =

Former member of Bihar Legislative Assembly

Member (MLA) of Bihar Legislative Assembly
- In office 1985–1990
- Constituency: Mirganj Assembly constituency
- In office 1990–1995
- Constituency: Mirganj Assembly constituency
- In office 2000–2005
- Constituency: Mirganj Assembly constituency

Personal details
- Party: Janata Dal (United)
- Other political affiliations: Rashtriya Janata Dal; Indian National Congress; Samata Party
- Relations: Rajesh Singh Kushwaha (nephew)
- Profession: Politician

Prabhu Dayal Singh was an Indian politician from Bihar, who served as member of Bihar Legislative Assembly for three terms from erstwhile Mirganj Assembly constituency in Gopalganj district of Bihar. Singh was a member of Rashtriya Janata Dal led by Lalu Prasad Yadav and was considered as a trusted aide of Yadav's brother-in-law Subhash Prasad Yadav. Singh had also served as member of other political parties which included Indian National Congress and Samata Party.

== Political career ==
Prabhu Dayal Singh belonged to Gopalganj district of Bihar and he represented Mirganj Assembly constituency, which is known as Hathua Assembly constituency from 2010 onwards. Singh belonged to Koeri caste and was believed to have significant hold over his community in this constituency, which has significant population of his castemen. He first won the 1985 Bihar Assembly election from this constituency on the symbol of Indian National Congress. Which was followed by his second victory in 1990 Bihar Assembly election as independent candidate. In 1985, he defeated Rajmangal Mishra of Janata Dal, while in 1990, he defeated Communist Party of India (Marxist) candidate Vishwanath Singh. For 1995 Bihar Assembly elections, Singh was fielded as the candidate of Indian National Congress but was defeated this time by CPI(M)'s Vishwanath Singh. However, he was able to retain this seat again in 2000 Bihar Assembly election, when he won for the third term. This time he was elected on the symbol of Samata Party.

Singh also contested Lok Sabha election in 2004. He was fielded from Gopalganj Lok Sabha constituency before it was reserved for the Schedule Castes. He contested this election against Sadhu Yadav, the brother-in-law of Lalu Prasad Yadav on the symbol of Janata Dal (United). However, he was defeated.

He died in 2008 after prolonged illness. Singh's nephew Rajesh Singh Kushwaha is a member of Rashtriya Janata Dal and he has served as district unit president of RJD for Gopalganj. In 2020 Bihar Assembly election, he defeated Ramsewak Singh Kushwaha of Janata Dal (United), a four-time MLA from Mirganj-Hathua Assembly constituency, to become a legislator for the first time.

== See also ==
- Yogendra Singh Kushwaha
