= Dulduliya =

- Village
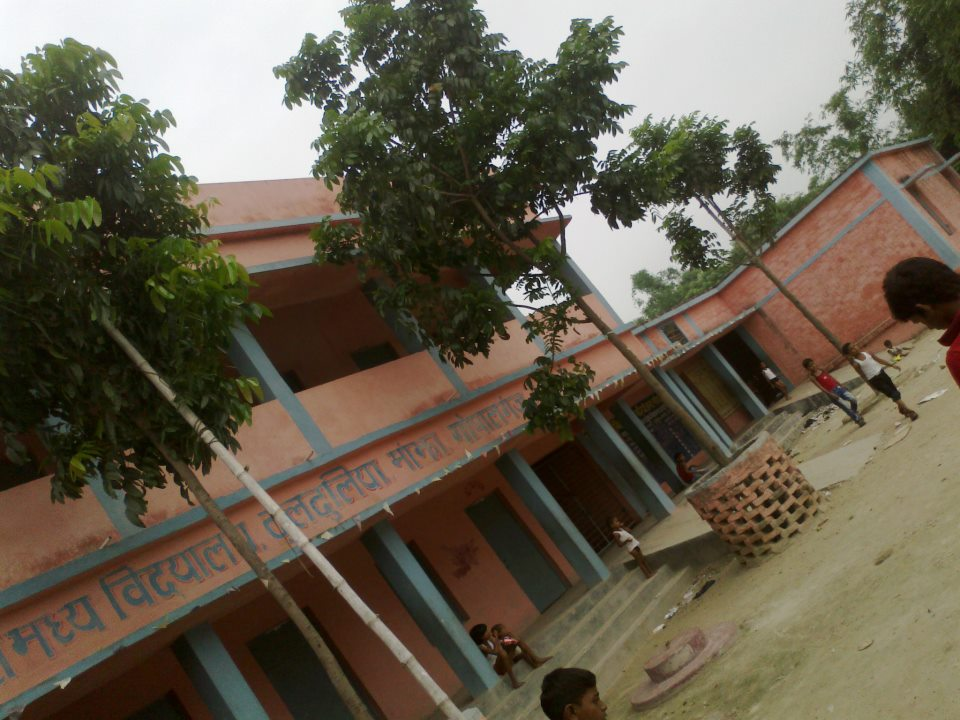
- Interactive map of Dulduliya
- State: Bihar
- Elevation: 71 m (233 ft)

Languages
  - Official: Bhojpuri, Hindi
- Time zone: UTC+5:30 (IST)
- Postal code: 841427
- Lok Sabha constituency: Gopalganj
- Vidhan Sabha constituency: Barauli
- Website: www.facebook.com/Dulduliya

Dulduliya is a small village in the Gopalganj district of Bihar, India. It is situated around 6 kilometres (3.7 mi) east of Gopalganj town, and 130 kilometres (81 mi) from the state's capital Patna.

== Education ==
Upgraded Urdu Middle School is a government school which caters to the needs of the children in this region up to class 8th. This school is located near the Qabristan in the heart of village. It has approximately 610 students enrolled managed by a faculty of around 20.

DIF (Darul Iqbal Foundation) is a Non-Government Organisation, described as "a public foundation related to socio-political as well as educational concerns in the remote villages". The organisation conducted an educational meet named "The Revolutionary Eve" on 19 June 2018 at the UMS playground for encouraging the students to pursue university education.

== Demographics ==
A major sector of the population is made up of Sheikh caste Muslims. Other castes include Fakeer, and Dalits such as Harijan and Pashwan.

== Geography ==
There is a national highway NH-28 which serves as a lifeline for road transportation in this area. There is a petrol pump located at the entrance of the village for the peoples who use motor bikes and 4-wheelers. There is also a railway line which bisects the village into two equal halves. The village is divided into three geographical parts. The core part is Dulduliya while the other two are known as Tola Dulduliya and Kursiya Tola. There are three Masjids here but the Jaama Masjid, Duldulia located in the core is not only the largest and also a hub (Markaz) of Tablighi Jamaat in the whole Barauli Halka. There is also a small Ganesh Mandir at the entrance of village. The surrounding villages are Sikmi in the West, Jagarnatha (East) & Jafar Tola, Admapur, Dhankhar in the South. The north part is a large rangeland of Sugarcane and have several small ponds called Chanwar. Paddy, wheat, sugarcane, mustard and maize are the common crops which are grown here.
