= Shahbajwan =

- Village
- Location in Bihar, India Shahbajwan (India)
- Coordinates: 26.4566376°N 84.4162671°E
- State: Bihar
- Elevation: 71 m (233 ft)

Languages
  - Official: Bhojpuri, Hindi
- Time zone: UTC+5:30 (IST)
- PIN: 841428
- Lok Sabha constituency: Gopalganj
- Vidhan Sabha constituency: Gopalganj

Shahbajwan is a village in Gopalganj, Bihar, situated near Turkahan near Thawe road. It is a small village. Although, it's not a big village, Shahbajwan is well known among city people due to its literacy rate and participation in social activities

== History ==
It was believed to be part of village Fathan, due to interruption of a river it became isolated. This river later meet to Gandhak river. Jobs are also available there. Ancient history is still a mystery. In 1996 it was officially declared as a village.

== Location ==
Shahbazwan is located near the Turkahan – Thawe road. It is in back side of Government School named M.M.M Urdu High School.
