= Fatehpur, Bihar =

Fatehpur
- village
- Location in Bihar, India Fatehpur (India)
- Coordinates: 26°24′15″N 84°15′32″E
- Country: India
- State: Bihar
- District: Gopalganj

Government
  - Type: Panchayati raj (India)
  - Body: Gram panchayat

Population
  - Total: 5,000

Languages
  - Official: Bhojpuri, Hindi, Urdu
- Time zone: UTC+5:30 (IST)
- PIN: 841436
- Telephone code: 06156
- ISO 3166 code: IN-BR
- Vehicle registration: BR-28
- Nearest city: Mirganj
- Literacy: 70%
- Lok Sabha constituency: Gopalganj

Fatehpur is a village in Gopalganj district (near Hathwa) of Bihar state, India. It is located between Mirganj and Bhore, near the Sabeyan Airport. Fatehpur is one of the 1365 villages, that were under Hathwa Raj Zamindari.

Fatehpur is famous for its Sheikh and Pathan population. It is also known for Dargaah of Fateh Dewaan Dada (from where it gets its name) and the Shiv Mandir near Deoor Pond. Fatehpur has mixed population of Hindus and Muslims. Scholars from Fatehpur visited United States and U.K. for higher education. Fatehpur has three local markets: Badka Gaon, Line Bazaar and Peooli. Maulana Manzar Imam is a famous personality of Fatehpur, with followers across India.

This village lacks the basic infrastructure. The nearest Hospital is almost 7 km, in the Sub-division Hathwa. Same is the case with nearest Secondary School and Degree College.
