= Kuchaikote Assembly constituency =

Coordinates: 26°32′39″N 84°20′27″E

Kuchaikote
- Constituency No. 102 for the Bihar Legislative Assembly

Constituency details
- Country: India
- Region: East India
- State: Bihar
- District: Gopalganj
- Lok Sabha constituency: 17. Gopalganj (SC)
- Established: 1951
- Total electors: 300,132

Member of Legislative Assembly
- 18th Bihar Legislative Assembly
- Incumbent Amrendra Kumar Pandey
- Party: JD(U)
- Alliance: NDA
- Elected year: 2025

Kuchaikote Assembly constituency is an assembly constituency in Gopalganj district in the Indian state of Bihar.

== Overview ==
As per Delimitation of Parliamentary and Assembly constituencies Order, 2008, No. 102 Kuchaikote Assembly constituency is composed of the following: Kuchaikote and Pachdeuri community development blocks. Kuchaykot assembly and its surrounding areas are dominated by Brahmin voters. This is why most of the time MLAs from Brahmin caste have been elected from here, here all the parties mostly give tickets to Brahmin candidates for Brahmin votes.

Kuchaikote Assembly constituency is part of No. 17 Gopalganj (Lok Sabha constituency) (SC).

== Members of the Legislative Assembly ==
Year	Name	Party
1952	Shiva Kumar Pathak	Indian National Congress
1957	Vachaspati Sharma	Indian National Congress
1962	Shiva Kumar Pathak	Indian National Congress
1967	Nagina Rai	Independent politician
1969	Nagina Rai	Janata Party
1972	Nagina Rai	Indian National Congress
1976-2008: Constituency did not exist
2010	Amrendra Kumar Pandey	Janata Dal (United)
2015	Amrendra Kumar Pandey	Janata Dal (United)
2020	Amrendra Kumar Pandey	Janata Dal (United)
2025	Amrendra Kumar Pandey	Janata Dal (United)

== Election results ==
=== 2025 ===
2025 Bihar Legislative Assembly election: Kuchaikote
Party	Candidate	Votes	%	±%
JD(U)	Amrendra Kumar Pandey	101,425	50.21	+9.02
INC	Harinarayan Singh	76,934	38.08	+8.32
JSP	Vijay Kumar Choubey	6,077	3.01	
BSP	Baliram Singh	5,542	2.74	
Jagrook Janta Party	Vishwakarma Sharma	2,646	1.31	
Janshakti Janta Dal	Braj Bihari Bhatt	2,025	1.0	
NOTA	None of the above	5,783	2.86	−1.38
Majority		24,491	12.13	+0.7
Turnout		202,020	67.31	+11.46
JD(U) hold		Swing		

=== 2020 ===
2020 Bihar Legislative Assembly election: Kuchaikote
Party	Candidate	Votes	%	±%
JD(U)	Amrendra Kumar Pandey	74,359	41.19	−2.09
INC	Kali Prasad Pandey	53,729	29.76	
RLSP	Sunita Devi	33,533	18.57	
Independent	Hari Narayan Singh	2,687	1.49	
LJP	Ravi Pandey	2,226	1.23	−39.91
Independent	Sudhanshu Kumar Pandey	1,681	0.93	
NOTA	None of the above	7,656	4.24	−0.26
Majority		20,630	11.43	+9.29
Turnout		180,530	55.85	−0.02
JD(U) hold		Swing		

=== 2015 ===
2015 Bihar Legislative Assembly election: Kuchaikote
Party	Candidate	Votes	%	±%
JD(U)	Amrendra Kumar Pandey	72,224	43.28	
LJP	Kali Prasad Pandey	68,662	41.14	
Independent	Parshuram Kumar	4,936	2.96	
CPI(M)	Muna Prasad	4,615	2.77	
Independent	Om Prakash Prasad	2,355	1.41	
BSP	Sadman Ali	1,801	1.08	
Garib Janta Dal (Secular)	Arjun Prasad Kushwaha	1,550	0.93	
NOTA	None of the above	7,512	4.5	
Majority		3,562	2.14	
Turnout		166,892	55.87	
