= OpIndia =

Indian far-right pro-Hindutva news portal

- Website type: Fake news; Far-right politics; Hindutva ideology
- Available in: English, Hindi, Gujarati
- Headquarters: New Delhi
- Owners: Aadhyaasi Media and Content Services
- Founders: Rahul Raj; Kumar Kamal
- Editors: Nupur J. Sharma (English); Chandan Kumar (Hindi)
- CEO: Rahul Roushan
- Website: opindia.com
- Commercial: Yes
- Launched: December 2014; 11 years ago

OpIndia is an Indian far-right (Note: Sources describing OpIndia as far-right:) news website known for frequently publishing disinformation. Founded in December 2014, the website has published fake news and Islamophobic commentary on numerous occasions. (Note: Sources describing OpIndia's publication of fake news:) (Note: Sources describing OpIndia's publication of Islamophobic content:) OpIndia is dedicated to criticism of what it considers liberal media, and to support the Bharatiya Janata Party (BJP) and the Hindutva ideology. According to University of Maryland researchers, OpIndia has shamed journalists it deems to be in opposition to the BJP and has alleged media bias against Hindus and the BJP.

In 2019, the International Fact-Checking Network (IFCN) rejected OpIndia's application to be certified as a fact checker. IFCN-certified fact checkers identified 25 fake news stories and 14 misreported stories published by OpIndia from January 2018 to June 2020. A study of 54,850 OpIndia articles published between 2014 and 2023 found that OpIndia consistently characterised Hindus in positive terms and Muslims in negative terms to further the website's Hindu nationalist ideals. OpIndia published a series of reports in 2020 falsely claiming that a Hindu boy was sacrificed in a Bihar mosque.

The website is owned by Aadhyaasi Media and Content Services, a former subsidiary of the parent company of the right-wing magazine Swarajya. The current CEO of OpIndia is Rahul Roushan, and the current editors are Nupur J Sharma (English) and Chandan Kumar (Hindi).

== History ==
Ownership and leadership of OpIndia's parent company, Aadhyaasi Media and Content Services, as of June 2020

OpIndia was founded in December 2014 by Rahul Raj and Kumar Kamal as a current affairs and news website. OpIndia is owned by Aadhyaasi Media and Content Services, a private limited company. In October 2016, Aadhyaasi Media was acquired by Kovai Media Private Limited, a Coimbatore-based company that also owns the right-wing magazine Swarajya. Kovai Media's most prominent investors were former Infosys executives T. V. Mohandas Pai (three percent ownership) and N. R. Narayana Murthy (two percent ownership). Kovai Media retained ownership of Aadhyaasi Media until July 2018.

Raj left OpIndia over a disagreement with the site's editorial stance. OpIndia and Aadhyaasi Media separated from Kovai Media in November 2018. Rahul Roushan was appointed the CEO of OpIndia, and Nupur J. Sharma became the editor. Roushan and Sharma each owned half of Aadhyaasi Media after the transition. In January 2019, Aadhyaasi Media was acquired by Kaut Concepts Management Pvt Ltd, which gained 98 percent ownership of Aadhyaasi Media and left Roushan and Sharma with one percent each. Kaut Concepts has a 26 percent stake in TFI Media Pvt Ltd, the operator of TFIpost—a Hindu nationalist website also known as The Frustrated Indian, and is directed by Ashok Kumar Gupta, who is associated with the Rashtriya Swayamsevak Sangh and campaigns for the Bharatiya Janata Party (BJP). Aadhyaasi Media's directors are Sharma, Gupta, and Roushan's wife, Shaili Raval.

In the 2018–2019 financial year, Aadhyaasi Media reported ₹1 million (US$10,000) in profit. Between March and June 2019, OpIndia purchased ₹90,000 (US$930) of political advertising on Facebook. The BJP petitioned Facebook to allow OpIndia to receive advertising revenue on the social network in November 2019. In 2020, the West Bengal Police filed first information reports (FIRs) against Sharma, Roushan and Ajeet Bharti (then editor of OpIndia Hindi) in response to content published on OpIndia. The Supreme Court of India stayed the FIRs in June 2020 after hearing a plea from the defendants which argued that the matter was outside the jurisdiction of the government of West Bengal. In December 2021, the Supreme Court quashed the FIRs after the West Bengal state government informed the court that they had decided to withdraw the FIRs.

In 2022, OpIndia was sent a legal notice by a woman at the Tikri protest site for doxxing her and falsely claiming that she was raped at the site.

== Content ==
OpIndia denounces what it describes as "liberal media". In an analysis of the 284 articles published by OpIndia in 2018, University of Maryland researchers Prashanth Bhat and Kalyani Chadha identified five recurring patterns in OpIndia's content:

1. Portraying mistakes as fake news: OpIndia has provided coverage of "misquoted statements, incorrect headlines, or errors" in various mainstream media outlets, including NDTV, The Times Group and BBC, and claimed them to be "fake news". After the outlets published corrections, OpIndia continued to allege that the errors were intentional. According to Bhat and Chadha, the rhetoric employed by OpIndia is similar to the strategies used by European right-wing populist publications that aim to engender distrust in the mainstream media.
2. Shaming journalists: OpIndia has attacked the "professional integrity" of specific mainstream media journalists that the website believes to be opposed to the ruling BJP, including journalists from The Wire, The Indian Express, NDTV and The Quint. OpIndia has accused these journalists of sexual harassment, plagiarism, financial misconduct, "malicious editing" and other forms of unethical behaviour. Some stories in this category were obtained by monitoring the journalists' social media accounts for "inconsistencies or contradictions". Bhat and Chadha compared OpIndia's method of attacking journalists to practices used by American right-wing publications.
3. Alleging partisanship: OpIndia has alleged the existence of a "news media conspiracy" in which mainstream media outlets are biased against the ruling BJP and India itself, and favourable toward the opposition Indian National Congress (INC), which the website considered part of the "establishment". OpIndia claimed that the media produced too little coverage of the INC's use of Cambridge Analytica, while providing too much coverage of the BJP's handling of the Rafale deal controversy. English-language outlets are the primary targets of OpIndia's criticism.
4. Amplifying criticism: OpIndia has regularly featured stories in which celebrities and public officials criticised mainstream media outlets, and reports in which the outlets apologised to critics. In these stories, OpIndia accused journalists of various faults, including "insensitivity and irresponsibility", disinformation, publishing sensitive information and compromising "national security". In one story, OpIndia covered the Ministry of Information and Broadcasting's criticism of journalist Nidhi Razdan, then played down the Minister's correction after the situation was revealed to be a "misunderstanding".
5. Alleging bias against India and Hindus: OpIndia has accused Indian publications of having a liberal media bias and of publishing stories that are "anti-India", particularly regarding India–Pakistan relations. The website published allegations that mainstream media outlets were "anti-Hindu", including in rebukes of Times Now and CNN-News18 for covering weight loss tips and fireworks bans around Diwali. Bhat and Chadha wrote that OpIndia's portrayal of the mainstream media as "pro-minority and anti-majority" is in line with the narratives communicated through Norwegian and German right-wing websites, and that the Diwali accusations resemble the "War on Christmas" allegations published by American right-wing outlets.

Raj, in 2014, intended for OpIndia to combat media manipulation and distinguish "what is being reported" from "what the facts are". In 2018, Sharma stated that OpIndia is openly right-leaning and does not claim to be ideologically neutral. Sharma described OpIndia's dislike of left-liberal ideas as one of the website's "ontological positions on the basis of which we operate" in 2019. As of June 2020, OpIndia declares on its website that it aims to produce content "that is free from the burden of liberal bias and political correctness". The site accepts article contributions from its readers.

Fact checkers certified by the Poynter Institute's International Fact-Checking Network (IFCN), including Alt News and Boom, have identified multiple instances in which OpIndia has published fake news. According to a Newslaundry data compilation, OpIndia published 25 fake news stories and 14 misreported stories between January 2018 and June 2020 that were fact-checked by other organisations. False reports on OpIndia frequently criticise Muslims. Newslaundry found 28 articles on OpIndia released from 15 to 29 November 2019 with headlines that explicitly named Muslims as perpetrators of various crimes. A writer who left OpIndia due to this trend told Newslaundry, "If the accused in an incident belongs to the Muslim community, then you have to mention his name in the heading. The news is to be published in such a way that if the reader is a Hindu, then he starts developing hatred for Muslims." In April 2020, Bharti blamed the severity of the COVID-19 pandemic in India on Muslim "martyrdom" in an OpIndia video that was disseminated among Hindutva-oriented WhatsApp groups. According to Alt News, OpIndia propagated 18 instances of misinformation in 2022.

In June 2020, Newslaundry compared OpIndia to the American far-right website Breitbart News, stating, "It's fair to say even Breitbart wouldn't publish the sort of stuff that you'd routinely see on OpIndia." An August 2021 Association of Computing Machinery conference paper that examined website articles and Twitter posts related to the COVID-19 pandemic in India showed that "~ 66% of the 50 most frequently occurring articles from OpIndia portrayed Islamophobic behaviour", that OpIndia's COVID-19 coverage focused on Muslims and the Tablighi Jamaat, and that OpIndia prominently published tweets that the Perspective evaluator identified as "rude, disrespectful, or unreasonable content". The paper concluded that "The widespread presence of media sources like OpIndia in our dataset, that frequently publish anti-Muslim content, shows that people used external sources to further Islamophobic views."

Discourse & Society released an analysis of 54,850 OpIndia articles published from December 2014 to May 2023, determining that OpIndia's content conformed to a Hindu nationalist discourse that designated Hindus as the in-group and Muslims as the out-group. For Hindus, OpIndia used first-person pronouns (such as "we") and positive descriptions that depicted the in-group as "innately good, non-offending, hapless" people who are "surviving and enduring atrocious crimes and being on the verge of perishing". For Muslims, OpIndia used third-person pronouns (such as "they") and negative descriptions that characterised the out-group as "self-victimising, conspirators, radical elements, merciless, brutal, blood lusty, brainwashing, and demanding privileges". OpIndia promoted the love jihad conspiracy theory and terms including "mob", "Taliban" and "Al Qaeda" to present an exaggerated representation of Muslims as violent offenders, while using the term "community" for Hindus and minimising instances of violence conducted by Hindu nationalists.

After the Wikipedia community declared OpIndia an unreliable source in March 2020, OpIndia began publishing news content on a regular basis portraying Wikipedia in a negative light; it has accused the English Wikipedia of having a left-wing and socialist bias, and has published the real names and employers of editors it accuses of being "Islamists" or "leftists". The Verge noted in 2025 that OpIndia attacks Wikipedia "in ways that parallel attacks from the US right, down to citations of Manhattan Institute research and quotes from the disgruntled cofounder, Sanger."

=== Bihar human sacrifice claims ===
OpIndia's 10 May article containing the human sacrifice claims. The headline was later revised.

Between 9–14 May 2020, OpIndia published a series of seven articles (one in English and six in Hindi) falsely claiming that Rohit Jaiswal, a Hindu boy, was sacrificed in a mosque in Bela Dih – a village in Kateya, Gopalganj, Bihar – after which his body was disposed of in a river on 28 March. In the articles, OpIndia alleged that the suspected perpetrators were "all Muslims". One of the articles asserted, "A new mosque had been built in the village and it is being alleged that there was a belief that if a Hindu was 'sacrificed', the mosque would become powerful and its influence would increase." The stories were accompanied with videos of Jaiswal's sister and father, in which neither of them mentioned a sacrifice or mosque.

Jaiswal's postmortem report indicated that his cause of death was "asphyxia due to drowning". Local residents in the village, including Jaiswal's mother, declined to corroborate the human sacrifice claims, and a local journalist said that the village did not have a new mosque. The first information report (FIR) filed by the father on 29 March listed six suspects (five Muslim boys and one Hindu boy) and did not reference a sacrifice or mosque. OpIndia later released an audio recording of its interview with Jaiswal's father, in which he claimed that Jaiswal was murdered in a mosque. In a follow-up interview with Newslaundry, the father retracted the claim and said that he made the accusations in "sheer frustration" of the attention around Jaiswal's death. After Newslaundry interviewed Bharti—then editor of OpIndia Hindi, OpIndia deleted the word "all" from the phrase "all Muslims" in its description of the suspected perpetrators.

Vijay Kumar Verma, a Deputy Inspector General of Bihar Police, disclosed on 14 May that he had filed an FIR against OpIndia under Section 67 (obscenity) of the Information Technology Act, 2000 and Section 295(A) (inciting religious outrage) of the Indian Penal Code for its reporting of the false human sacrifice claims. The FIR stated that OpIndia published the claims "without knowing or understanding the case". On 17 May, the Director General of Bihar Police, Gupteshwar Pandey, examined the drowning incident and found no evidence supporting the human sacrifice claims or the suspicion of communal motives behind the death.

=== Plagiarism ===
OpIndia has also been engaged in plagiarism and copyright violation in their articles without attributing to the original publishers. It was later discovered by Alt News when OpIndia published an article covering 2020 Pulitzer Prize nomination about three Kashmiri journalists who were awarded for their photographs taken during the state-wide lockdown imposed in 2019 by the ruling party, the BJP, after the revocation of article 370 involving the Kashmir conflict.

== Reception ==
In March 2019, the IFCN rejected OpIndia's application to be certified as a fact checker. While noting partial compliance on a number of categories, the IFCN rejected the application on grounds of political partisanship and lack of transparency and raised concerns over questionable fact-checking methodologies. The rejection disqualified OpIndia from fact-checking contracts with web properties owned by Facebook and Google. In response, Sharma criticised the IFCN assessment and urged for acceptance of outlets with "declared ideological leanings".

After co-founder Raj departed OpIndia, he described the website as a "blind mouthpiece" of the BJP on Twitter in August 2019. Raj criticised Sharma, alleging that she and others "started as trolls" and "abuse and play victim card when questioned". OpIndia was blacklisted from Wikipedia in March 2020 (alongside Swarajya and TFIpost) after Sharma, in an OpIndia piece, published personally identifying information about a Wikipedia editor who helped write the encyclopedia's article on the 2020 Delhi riots, which resulted in the editor leaving Wikipedia. OpIndia was characterized as "an Indian version of The Gateway Pundit that pretends to be The Onion when others catch them publishing false and misleading information."

Stop Funding Hate, a British social media campaign, urged organisations to withdraw their advertising from OpIndia in May 2020 after the website published an article asserting that businesses should be able to declare that they do not hire Muslims. The head of the campaign, Richard Wilson, said that "OpIndia is becoming internationally notorious for its hateful and discriminatory coverage" and that the campaign has "rarely seen such overt advocacy of discrimination on religious grounds". Over 20 organisations, including advertising network Rubicon Project, video streaming service Mubi, personal care brand Harry's and the Saïd Business School, ceased advertising on OpIndia as a result of the campaign. Sharma responded that she would "stand by our article and our content 100%" and that OpIndia would "never alter its core belief system or content". Roushan stated that advertisements constitute a minority of OpIndia's revenue and claimed that OpIndia received a "700% jump" in donations during the campaign.

== See also ==
- Fake news in India
- List of fake news websites
