= Thawe Junction railway station =

Railway station in Muzaffarpur, Bihar, India

THAWE JUNCTION

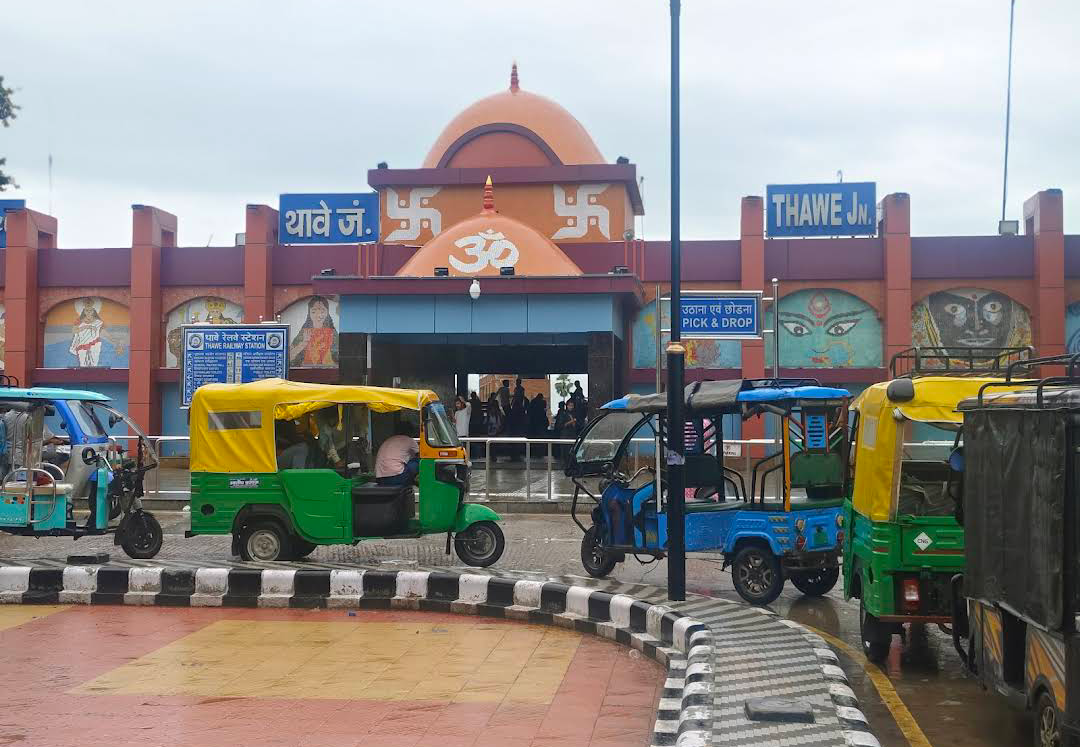
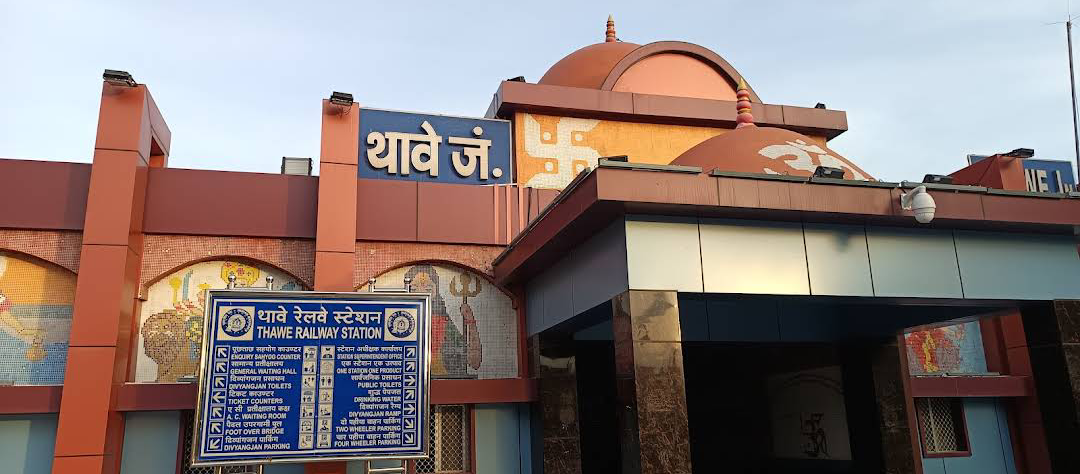

General information
- Location: Gopalganj, Bihar; India
- Coordinates: 26.4389°N 84.3949°E
- Elevation: 57 metres (187 ft)
- System: Indian Railways station
- Owner: North Eastern Railway zone
- Operator: Indian Railways
- Platforms: 3
- Tracks: 5
- Connections: City bus, auto rickshaw, taxi, cab service

Construction
- Structure type: Standard (on ground station)
- Parking: Available
- Cycle facilities: Not Available
- Architectural style: Modern (after Redevelopment)

Other information
- Status: Functioning
- Station code: THE
- Zone(s): North Eastern Railway zone
- Division(s): Varanasi railway division

History
- Opened: 1910; 116 years ago
- Rebuilt: 2025 under Amrit Bharat Station Scheme
- Electrified: 2006; 20 years ago, 25 kV AC
- Former names: East Indian Railway
Location
- Location within India Location within Bihar
- Interactive map of Thawe Junction

Thawe Junction railway station (sometimes pronounced Thawen) (station code: THE), is a medium-sized village in the Gopalganj district of the Indian state of Bihar. Located about 6 kilometers southwest of the district headquarters Gopalganj, Thawe is a popular pilgrimage site for Hindu devotees due to the presence of the notable Devi temple, Thawe Mandir. The village is also served by Thawe Junction railway station, a key railway station under the North Eastern Railway zone of Indian Railways. The station connects several important regional lines and facilitates travel to major cities such as Lucknow, Gorakhpur, Patna, and Tatanagar.

== Redevelopment ==
Thawe Junction railway station has been redeveloped under the Government of India’s Amrit Bharat Station Scheme (ABSS), which aims to modernize major railway stations across the country by enhancing infrastructure, aesthetics, and passenger amenities.

The redevelopment project was completed at an estimated cost of ₹11.75 crore. The inauguration of the station’s upgraded facilities took place in 2023 and was part of a nationwide event in which Prime Minister Narendra Modi virtually inaugurated 103 redeveloped railway stations across 18 states.

=== Key features of the redevelopment ===
Redevelopment details at Thawe Junction
Feature	Description
Station building	Construction of a modern 400 square metre station building
Circulating area	Expanded to 1,030 square metres to improve passenger movement
Platforms	Platforms 1, 2, and 3 were expanded and upgraded
Passenger shelters	28-bay sheds installed; additional large shed for weather protection
Platform surfacing	Kota stone paving on Platform 1
Waiting room	Renovated with new furniture and local artwork
Amenities	Addition of water coolers, ceiling fans, food stalls, and international-standard signage
Assistance counter	Establishment of a "Sahayog" (help) counter
Parking facilities	Dedicated parking for two-wheelers and four-wheelers
Approach road	Upgraded with a formal entrance gate and pedestrian pathways

== New lines ==
Railway has sanctioned the construction of Thawe-Motinari-Chhauradano rail line. Its final location survey are on the way. Tender for the construction, soon to be released.

== Major trains ==
The following trains halt at Thawe Junction railway station. The list excludes special trains (number starting with '0'):

Major trains at Thawe Junction (THE)
Train No.	Train Name	From – To	Days of Operation	Departure Time
19410	Gorakhpur–Ahmedabad Express	Thawe Jn – Sabarmati BG	Mon, Sat	01:00
75104	THE–CPR DMU	Thawe Jn – Chhapra	Daily	04:15
55113	SV–THE Passenger	Siwan Jn – Thawe Jn	Daily	Arrives 05:20
15113	GTNR–CPR Express	Gomti Nagar – Chhapra	Daily	06:05
19046	Tapti Ganga Express	Thawe Jn – Surat	Tue, Wed, Fri, Sat, Sun	05:40
55115	THE–CPJ Passenger	Thawe Jn – Kaptanganj Jn	Daily	05:40
15080	GKP–PPTA Express	Gorakhpur – Patliputra	Daily	06:50
75103	CPR–THE DMU	Chhapra – Thawe Jn	Daily	Arrives 08:25
75105	THE–JEA DMU	Thawe Jn – Nakaha Jungle	Daily	08:55
55036	GKC–SV Passenger	Gorakhpur Cant – Siwan Jn	Daily	09:20
55110	CI–THE Passenger	Chhapra Kacheri – Thawe Jn	Daily	Arrives 09:25
55105	CI–THE Passenger	Chhapra Kacheri – Thawe Jn	Daily	Arrives 10:00
18182	THE–TATA Express	Thawe Jn – Tatanagar	Wed, Thu, Sat, Sun	10:10
55107	THE–CPJ Passenger	Thawe Jn – Kaptanganj Jn	Daily	10:30
55112	THE–MHC Passenger	Thawe Jn – Masrakh	Daily	10:30
55116	CPJ–THE Passenger	Kaptanganj Jn – Thawe Jn	Daily	Arrives 11:25
55109	THE–CI Passenger	Thawe Jn – Chhapra Kacheri	Daily	11:50
55037	SV–THE Passenger	Siwan Jn – Thawe Jn	Daily	Arrives 13:25
55038	THE–SV Passenger	Thawe Jn – Siwan Jn	Daily	14:05
55104	CI–THE Passenger	Chhapra Kacheri – Thawe Jn	Daily	Arrives 16:05
55108	CPJ–THE Passenger	Kaptanganj Jn – Thawe Jn	Daily	Arrives 16:15
55106	THE–CI Passenger	Thawe Jn – Chhapra Kacheri	Daily	16:35
55103	THE–CI Passenger	Thawe Jn – Chhapra Kacheri	Daily	17:00
18181	TATA–THE Express	Tatanagar – Thawe Jn	Tue, Wed, Fri, Sat	Arrives 17:15
03215	PNBE–THE Express	Patna Jn – Thawe Jn	Daily	Arrives 17:40
55111	MHC–THE Passenger	Masrakh – Thawe Jn	Daily	Arrives 17:45
55035	SV–GKC Passenger	Siwan Jn – Gorakhpur Cant	Daily	18:20
03216	THE–PNBE Special	Thawe Jn – Patna Jn	Daily	18:25
55114	THE–SV Passenger	Thawe Jn – Siwan Jn	Daily	19:30
15079	PPTA–GKP Express	Patliputra – Gorakhpur	Daily	20:20
19409	SBIB–Thawe Express	Sabarmati BG – Thawe Jn	Fri, Sun	Arrives 20:30
19045	Tapti Ganga Express	Surat – Thawe Jn	Mon, Tue, Thu, Fri, Sat	Arrives 20:55
15114	CPR–GTNR Express	Chhapra – Gomti Nagar	Daily	21:45
75106	GKP–THE DMU	Gorakhpur – Thawe Jn	Daily	Arrives 23:45

== See also ==
- Thawe Mandir
- Gopalganj district, India
