= Amtha khem =

Amtha khem is a small village in Linebazar panchayat of Gopalganj District in Bihar. It is 500 m away from Linebazar.
