= Kateya Assembly constituency =

Coordinates: 26°34′10″N 84°05′33″E

Kateya
- Former constituency for the Bihar Legislative Assembly

Constituency details
- Country: India
- Region: East India
- State: Bihar
- District: Gopalganj
- Lok Sabha constituency: Gopalganj
- Established: 1962
- Abolished: 2010

Kateya Assembly constituency was an assembly constituency in Gopalganj district in the Indian state of Bihar.

== Overview ==
It was part of Gopalganj Lok Sabha constituency.

As a consequence of the orders of the Delimitation Commission of India, Kateya Assembly constituency ceased to exist in 2010. Police station and various public departments are located here.

== Members of Vidhan Sabha ==
Year	Member	Party
1962	Badari Mahara	Swatantra Party
1967	Badari Mahara	Indian National Congress
1969	Nathuni Ram Chamar	Indian National Congress
1972	Algu Ram	Indian National Congress (O)
1977	Nagina Rai	Indian National Congress
1980	Sinheshwar Shahi	Indian National Congress (I)
1985	Bachcha Choubey	Janata Party
1990	Bachcha Choubey	Indian National Congress
1995	Sinheshwar Shahi	Janata Dal
2000	Kiran Devi	Rashtriya Janata Dal
2005	Amrendra Kumar Pandey	Bahujan Samaj Party
2005	Amrendra Kumar Pandey	Bahujan Samaj Party
2010 onwards: Constituency does not exist
