= Mirganj Assembly constituency =

Former Assembly constituency in Bihar, India

Coordinates: 26°22′00″N 84°20′40″E

Mirganj
- Former constituency for the Bihar Legislative Assembly

Constituency details
- Country: India
- Region: East India
- State: Bihar
- District: Gopalganj
- Lok Sabha constituency: Gopalganj
- Established: 1957
- Abolished: 2008

Mirganj Assembly constituency was an assembly constituency in Gopalganj district in the Indian state of Bihar.

== Overview ==
It was part of Gopalganj Lok Sabha constituency.

As a consequence of the orders of the Delimitation Commission of India, Mirganj Assembly constituency ceased to exist in 2010.

== Members of Vidhan Sabha ==
Year	Member	Party
1957	Janardan Sinha	Indian National Congress
1962	Prabhunath Tiwari	Praja Socialist Party
1967	Siya Bihari Sharan	Samyukta Socialist Party
1969	Anant Prasad Singh	Indian National Congress
1972	Anant Prasad Singh	Indian National Congress
1977	Bhavesh Chandra Prasad	Janata Party
1980	Raj Mangal Mishra	Janata Party
1985	Prabhu Dayal Singh	Indian National Congress
1990	Prabhu Dayal Singh	Independent
1995	Vishwanath Singh	Communist Party of India (M)
2000	Prabhu Dayal Singh	Samata Party
2005	Ramsewak Kushwaha	Janata Dal (United)
2005	Ramsewak Kushwaha	Janata Dal (United)
2010 onwards: Constituency doesnot exist
