= Barauli, Bihar =

Barauli
- Town
- Location in India
- Coordinates: 26°22′53″N 84°35′14″E
- Country: India
- State: Bihar
- District: Gopalganj
- Established: 1974

Government
  - Body: Nagar parishad

Area
  - Total: 22.21 km^{2} (8.58 sq mi)

Population (2011)
  - Total: 41,877
  - Density: 1,886/km^{2} (4,883/sq mi)

Language
  - Official: Hindi
  - Regional: Bhojpuri
- Time zone: UTC+5:30 (IST)
- PIN: 841405
- ISO 3166 code: IN-BR
- Vehicle registration: BR28
- Lok Sabha constituency: Gopalganj
- Vidhan Sabha constituency: Barauli

Barauli is a town and a notified area in Gopalganj district in the state of Bihar, India.

== Geography ==
Barauli is located at 26°22′53″N 84°35′14″E. It has an average elevation of 65 metres (213 ft).It occupies an area of 22.21 square kilometres (8.58 sq mi).

== Demographics ==
As of the 2011 Census of India, Barauli town had a population of 41,877, of which 20,806 are males while 21,071 are females. Population within the age group of 0 to 6 years was 7,095 which is 16.94% of total population of Barauli town. Barauli had an average literacy rate of 56.31%, lower than the state average of 61.8% with male literacy of 56.86%, and female literacy was 43.14%.

== See also ==
- Barauli, Bihar (Vidhan Sabha constituency)
