= Rajesh Singh Kushwaha =

Indian politician

Rajesh Kumar Singh
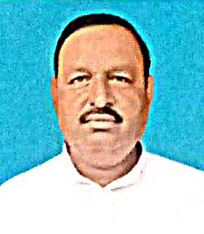

Member of the Bihar Legislative Assembly
- In office 2020–2025
- Preceded by: Ramsewak Singh Kushwaha
- Succeeded by: Ramsewak Singh Kushwaha
- Constituency: Hathua

Personal details
- Party: Rashtriya Janata Dal

Rajesh Kumar Singh also known as Rajesh Singh Kushwaha is a Member of Legislative Assembly for Bihar Legislative Assembly from the Hathua Assembly constituency in Gopalganj district. Singh was elected to the Assembly in 2020 Assembly elections by defeating Ram Sewak Singh of Janata Dal (United), by a margin of more than 30,000 votes. He was elected as a candidate of Rashtriya Janata Dal.

== Political career ==
Rajesh Singh Kushwaha belongs to a political family of Gopalganj district. He is the nephew of Prabhu Dayal Singh, the three term MLA from Mirganj Assembly constituency of Gopalganj district. He served as district president of Rashtriya Janata Dal for Gopalganj before getting the party symbol in 2010 Bihar Legislative Assembly elections. In 2010, he was candidate of RJD from Hathua Assembly constituency, but was defeated by Ramsewak Singh Kushwaha of Janata Dal (United). In 2015, he contested as independent candidate from Hathua and finished in third position. He got 32,959 votes while the runner-up Maha Chandra Singh got 34,933 votes.

== Controversies ==
In 2020, Sabeya Siddiqui, the director of Sara International school, located at ITI square Hathua alleged that Kushwaha's brother Vijay Bahadur Singh demanded a ransom of 20 lakhs from her. When she disagreed the men of Kushwaha fired several rounds at her school premises. The situation of the region became tense as the victim and their dependents protested near the police station for undertaking the action by the administration against Hathua MLA Kushwaha.

== See also ==
- Ram Lakhan Mahato
- Sunil Kumar Kushwaha
