= Subhash Prasad Yadav =

Indian politician based in Bihar

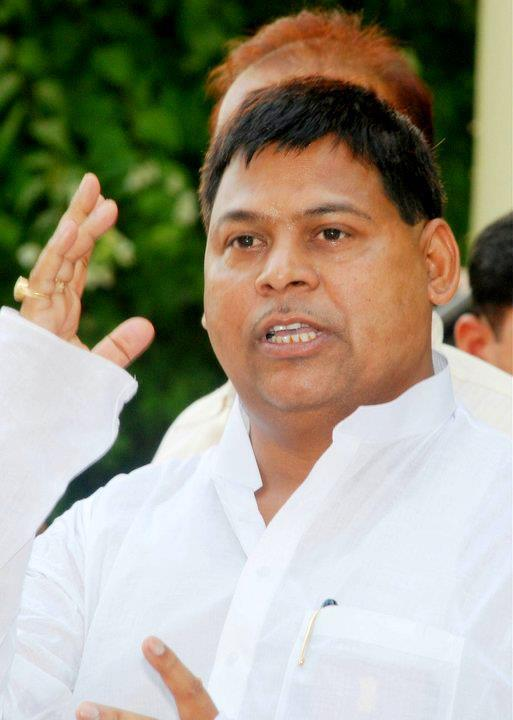

Member of Parliament (MP) in Rajya Sabha
- In office 2004–2010
- Constituency: Bihar

Member (MLC) in Bihar Legislative Council
- In office Jul 1998 – Jun 2004

Personal details
- Born: 27 March 1967 (age 59) Gopalganj, Bihar, India
- Party: Rashtriya Janata Dal
- Spouse: Renu Yadav (m. 1987)
- Relations: Rabri Devi, Jilebi Yadav, Paan Yadav(sisters); Sadhu Yadav (brother); Lalu Prasad Yadav (brother-in-law); Tejashwi Yadav (nephew); Tej Pratap Yadav (nephew); Misa Bharti (niece)
- Children: 4 (2 sons and 2 daughters)
- Parents: Shiv Prasad Chaudhary (father); Maharjia Devi (mother)

Subhash Prasad Yadav (born 27 March 1967) is an Indian politician belonging to Rashtriya Janata Dal (RJD). He was a Member of Parliament representing Bihar in the Rajya Sabha, the upper house from 2004 to 2010.

Subhash Yadav is the real brother of Sadhu Yadav and Rabri Devi. His sister Rabri is former Chief Minister of Bihar and Brother Sadhu was Member of Parliament from Gopalganj Lok Sabha .

== Early life ==
Subhash Prasad Yadav was born on 27 March 1967 in Salar Kalan village near Mirganj of Gopalganj district, Bihar. His parents are Shiv Prasad Chaudhary and Maharjia Devi.

He matriculated from Mukti Adarsh High School (BSEB) in 1986, passed the intermediate examination in Arts from Gopalganj College (University of Bihar) in 1989, and later graduated with a BA from R.P.S College Patna (Magadh University) in 1993.

=== Family ===
Subhash Prasad Yadav has 2 brothers Sadhu Yadav and Prabhunath Yadav, and 4 sisters Rabri Devi, Jalebi, Rasgulla and Paan.

== Personal life ==
Subhash Yadav married Renu Yadav on 27 February 1987 and the couple has two sons, Randhir and Saurav, and two daughters, Alka and Ekta.

== Political career ==
Subhash Prasad Yadav was a clerk in the Patna secretariat and when his sister Rabri Devi became the chief minister of Bihar, he quit his job and joined RJD to support his sister in July 1997. He started working as a member of the RJD party and became the Member of Parliament (MP) in the Rajya Sabha (upper house) as a representative of Bihar in 2004.

Subhash Yadav supported Ramanand Yadav, a former Bharatiya Janata Party (BJP) candidate from Danapur He got him elected with a margin of 55,000 votes on the RJD ticket in the 2002 by-election.

== Criminal cases ==
=== Illegal Sand Mining and Money Laundering Case ===
In March 2024, he was arrested by the Enforcement Directorate (ED) under the Prevention of Money Laundering Act (PMLA). The case was linked to illegal sand mining in Bihar. The ED's action followed around 20 FIRs filed by Bihar Police against Broadsons Commodities Pvt. Ltd. (BCPL) and its directors for mining and selling sand without valid documents. During raids at Yadav's premises, the ED recovered ₹2.3 crore in cash and estimated the total proceeds of crime at ₹161 crore. He was later presented before a special PMLA court in Patna and sent to judicial custody.

=== Illegal land grabbing ===
In May 2023, he was booked along with his family for land grabbing, cheating, extortion, and intimidation. A resident accused him of forcibly taking ₹60 lakh during a land deal dispute. The case was filed after a complaint was raised at the Bihar CM’s ‘Janta Darbar’.

== See also ==
- List of Rajya Sabha members from Bihar
