= Sadhu Yadav =

Indian politician based in Bihar

Anirudh Prasad Yadav
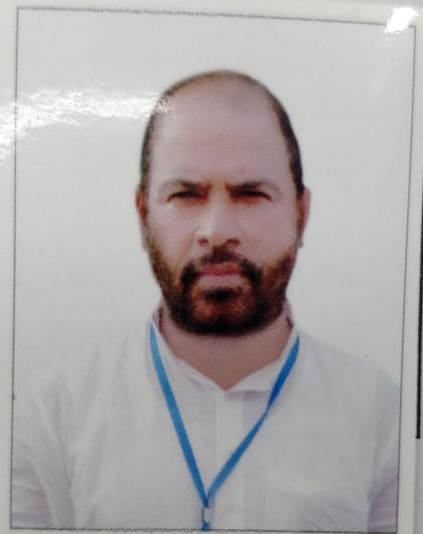

Member of Parliament, Lok Sabha
- In office 2004–2009
- Preceded by: Raghunath Jha
- Succeeded by: Purnmasi Ram
- Constituency: Gopalganj

Member of Bihar Legislative Assembly
- In office 2000–2004
- Preceded by: Ramawtar
- Succeeded by: Reyazul Haque
- Constituency: Gopalganj

Member of Bihar Legislative Council
- In office 1998–2000
- In office 1995–1997
- Constituency: Bihar

President of Garib Janta Dal (Secular)
- In office 2015–2020
- Preceded by: office established
- Succeeded by: position demolished

Personal details
- Born: Anirudh Prasad Yadav; 5 July 1967 (age 59) Salar Kalan village, Gopalganj district, Bihar
- Party: Bahujan Samaj Party
- Other political affiliations: Jan Adhikar Party (Loktantrik); Rashtriya Janata Dal; Indian National Congress; Garib Janta Dal (Secular)
- Spouse: Indira Yadav (m. 1986)
- Relations: Subhash Prasad Yadav (brother); Rabri Devi (sister); Lalu Prasad Yadav (brother-in-law); Tejashwi Yadav (nephew); Tej Pratap Yadav (nephew); Misa Bharti (niece)
- Children: 5 (1 son and 4 daughters)
- Parents: Shiv Prasad Chaudhary (father); Maharjia Devi (mother)
- Nickname: Sadhu Yadav

Anirudh Prasad Yadav, better known as Sadhu Yadav (born 5 July 1967), is an Indian politician and founder of Garib Janta Dal (Secular). He has served in 14th Lok Sabha as MP of Gopalganj from 2004 to 2009 as Rashtriya Janata Dal (RJD) candidate. Sadhu was MLA of Gopalganj assembly from 2000 to 2004.

Sadhu Yadav is the brother of Prabhunath Yadav, Subhash Prasad Yadav and Rabri Devi. His sister Rabri is married to Lalu Prasad Yadav, former Railway Minister of India and former Chief Minister of Bihar.

== Early life ==
Sadhu Yadav was born on 5 July 1967 in Salar Kalan village near Mirganj of Gopalganj district, Bihar. His parents are Shiv Prasad Chaudhary and Maharjia Devi.

Sadhu Yadav has 2 brothers Subhash Prasad Yadav and Prabhunath Yadav, and 4 sisters Rabri Devi, Jalebi, Rasgulla and Paan.

== Personal life ==
Sadhu Yadav is married to Indira Devi since 19 June 1986 and the couple have 1 son and 4 daughters.}

His daughter Dr Isha Yadav is married to Rahul Yadav, son of Sheela Yadav. Sheela is the sister of Dharmendra Yadav (former MP of Badaun).

== Political career ==
=== 1995-2010 ===
As a member of the RJD, Sadhu Yadav was a MLC in Bihar Legislative Council from 1995 to 1997 and 1998 to 2000 and was also MLA of Gopalganj in Bihar Legislative Assembly from 2000 to 2004. He was elected in 14th Lok Sabha as a Member of Parliament (MP) for the Gopalganj Lok Sabha constituency.

He left the RJD after a dispute with his brother-in-law, Lalu Prasad Yadav, related to the allocation of constituencies between RJD and the Lok Janshakti Party (LJP). The Gopalganj constituency had become a reserved seat then and Prakash Jha an LJP candidate, who had lost the election in 2004 from Bettiah, was preferred for the Paschim Champaran seat.

Two days after leaving the RJD, in March 2009, Sadhu Yadav joined the Indian National Congress (INC) and unsuccessfully contested the Paschim Champaran Lok Sabha constituency and lost to Sanjay Jaiswal.

=== 2010-Present ===
In March 2010 he was briefly suspended from the Indian National Congress for allegedly challenging the party's policy strategy. He denied voicing any such challenge and his explanation was accepted. Returning to the Gopalganj constituency, Yadav then fought and lost as a candidate for the INC in the 2010 Bihar legislative assembly election. That election saw confusion regarding the ages of several candidates, including Yadav. The candidates claimed that errors had resulted in the printing process for pre-election affidavits, and in Yadav's case this meant that he was recorded as aged 47 in 2009 when he had been shown as 44 at the time of the 2004 general elections. When asked for clarification by the BBC in 2009, he claimed to be aged 40.

On 25 March 2014, he announced his candidature for 2014 Lok Sabha elections from Saran contesting against his sister and ex-Chief Minister of Bihar Rabri Devi. He stood as an independent candidate. However, he lost the seat to BJP candidate Rajiv Pratap Rudy. He finished a distant third from the Barauli assembly seat in 2015 assembly polls by Jan Adhikar Party (Loktantrik). He contested the 2019 Indian general election as a BSP candidate from Maharajganj, but lost to Janardan Singh Sigriwal.

== Controversy ==
He came under fire from his nephew's family in October 2025 after openly criticizing Tejashwi's union with Christian Rachel Godinho. Tejashwi's siblings reacted negatively to Sadhu's comments criticizing the interfaith union on social media, calling him a murderer and comparing him to the Hindu mythological villain "Kansa Mama". In response, members of the Chhatra Janshakti Parishad, the RJD's student branch, set fire to an effigy of Sadhu in protest. Tejashwi's older brother, RJD lawmaker Tej Pratap Yadav, posted pictures of the burning effigy online and urged his uncle to face him head-on.

The 2003 film Gangaajal, which is based on true events in Bihar and features a politician character called Sadhu Yadav, caused Yadav's supporters to attack cinemas when it was released. Yadav himself attempted to prevent screening of the film, pleading to the court that it belittled him, but Prakash Jha, the director, claimed that "Sadhu Yadav is just a character in the movie. The movie has nothing to do with the profession of politics nor is it a caricature of the Bihar politician."
