= Hathua Assembly constituency =

Coordinates: 26°21′02″N 84°18′27″E

Hathua
- Constituency No. - for the Bihar Legislative Assembly

Constituency details
- Country: India
- Region: East India
- State: Bihar
- District: Gopalganj
- Established: 2008
- Total electors: 291,165

Member of Legislative Assembly
- 18th Bihar Legislative Assembly
- Incumbent Ramsewak Singh Kushwaha
- Party: JD(U)
- Alliance: NDA
- Elected year: 2025

Hathua is an assembly constituency in Gopalganj district in the Indian state of Bihar. In 2020 Rajesh Kumar Singh Kushwaha of Rashtriya Janata Dal defeated Ramsewak Singh Kushwaha of Janata Dal (United) to emerge victorious. Hathua Assembly constituency is part of No. 17 Gopalganj (Lok Sabha constituency) (SC).

== History ==
As per "Delimitation of Parliamentary and Assembly constituencies Order, 2008, No. 104", Hathua Assembly constituency is composed of the following: Hathua and Gopalganj

Phulwaria community development blocks; Jamsar, Trilokpur, Mohaicha, Balesara gram panchayats and Mirganj (NA) of Uchkagaon CD Block.

== Members of the Legislative Assembly ==
Year	Member	Party
Until 2008: Constituency did not exist
2010	Ramsewak Singh Kushwaha	Janata Dal (United)
2015	Ramsewak Singh Kushwaha	Janata Dal (United)
2020	Rajesh Singh Kushwaha	Rashtriya Janata Dal
2025	Ramsewak Singh Kushwaha	Janata Dal (United)

== Election results ==
=== 2025 ===
Bihar Assembly election, 2025: Hathua
Party	Candidate	Votes	%	±%
JD(U)	Ramsewak Singh Kushwaha	92,121	46.99	+14.7
RJD	Rajesh Kumar Singh	79,773	40.69	−9.15
JSP	Sanjay Kumar Suman	5,089	2.6	
BSP	Shabanm Khatun	3,789	1.93	−0.02
Independent	Nauraj Sah	3,640	1.86	
AAP	Indrajit Jyotishkar	3,117	1.59	
Independent	Surendra Gupta	2,454	1.25	−0.1
NOTA	None of the above	3,094	1.58	−1.01
Majority		12,348	6.3	−11.25
Turnout		196,058	67.34	+10.1
JD(U) gain from RJD		Swing		

=== 2020 ===
Bihar Assembly election, 2020: Hathua
Party	Candidate	Votes	%	±%
RJD	Rajesh Kumar Singh	86,731	49.84	
JD(U)	Ramsewak Singh Kushwaha	56,204	32.29	▼4.23
LJP	Ram Darshan Prasad	9,894	5.69	
Independent	Shreeram Bhagat	4,135	2.38	
BSP	Surendra Ram S/O Kanhaiya Ram	3,392	1.95	▼0.21
Independent	Surendra Gupta	2,343	1.35	
Independent	Dr Shashi Bhushan Rai	1,803	1.04	▼1.69
NOTA	None of the above	4,501	2.59	▲0.87
Majority		30,527	17.55	▲3.06
Turnout		174,035	57.24	▼0.77
RJD gain from JD(U)		Swing		

=== 2015 ===
2015 Bihar Legislative Assembly election: Hathua
Party	Candidate	Votes	%	±%
JD(U)	Ramsewak Singh	57,917	36.52	
HAM(S)	Mahachandra Pd. Singh	34,933	22.03	
Independent	Rajesh Kumar Singh Rampur Kala	32,959	20.78	
Independent	Dr Shashi Bhushan Rai	4,333	2.73	
Independent	Ramdarshan Prasad	4,027	2.54	
Janta Dal Rashtravadi	Saviv Alam	3,903	2.46	
BSP	Imteyaj Ahmad	3,429	2.16	
Rashtriya Jan-Jagram Morcha	Indra Kumar Jyotikar	3,336	2.1	
Independent	Rajesh Kumar Singh Belwa Thakurai	2,176	1.37	
Garib Janta Dal (Secular)	Ramaji Sah	2,138	1.35	
CPI(ML)L	Sriram Sharma	2,066	1.3	
Bhartiya New Sanskar Krantikari Party	Farookh Khan	1,501	0.95	
NOTA	None of the above	2,723	1.72	
Majority		22,984	14.49	
Turnout		158,595	58.01	
Bhartiya New Sanskar Krantikari Party	Farookh Khan	1,501	0.95	
