= Acharya Vishwanath Baitha =

Indian politician

Acharya Vishwanath Baitha is an Indian politician and member of the Bharatiya Janata Party. Baitha was a member of the Bihar Legislative Assembly from the Bhore constituency in Gopalganj district.
