= Subhash Singh (Bihar politician) =

Indian politician (1963–2022)

Subash Singh MLA

Minister of Co-operative Government of Bihar
- In office 9 February 2021 – 9 August 2022
- Chief Minister: Nitish Kumar
- Preceded by: Amrendra Pratap Singh

Member of the Bihar Legislative Assembly
- In office 2000 – 16 August 2022
- Preceded by: Reyajul Haque
- Succeeded by: Kusum Devi
- Constituency: Gopalganj

Personal details
- Born: 15 January 1963 Gopalganj, Bihar, India
- Died: 16 August 2022 (aged 59) AIIMS, New Delhi, India
- Party: Bhartiya Janta Party
- Spouse: Kusum Devi
- Children: Durgesh Singh Aniket Singh (Golu)
- Parent: Baban Singh

Subash Singh (15 January 1963 – 16 August 2022) was an Indian politician. He was elected as a member of the Bihar Legislative Assembly in 2015 from Gopalganj. In the 2020 Bihar Legislative Assembly election, he defeated the congress candidate and became a cabinet minister in the Bihar government, starting from 2021.

== Bihar Legislative Assembly ==
In the 2005 and the 2010 Bihar Assembly elections, Subash Singh of the Bharatiya Janta Party won the seat by defeating Reyajul Haque from Rashtriya Janata Dal. He won the election by defeating Reyajul Haque, with a margin of 6500.

In 2015, Subash Singh again won the seat by defeating Reyajul Haque from Rashtriya Janata Dal, with a margin of 5074 votes.

In the 2020 Bihar Legislative Assembly election, he defeated the congress candidate and became a cabinet minister in the Bihar government, starting from 2021.

== Death ==
Subhash Singh died at the All India Institute of Medical Sciences (AIIMS) in New Delhi on 16 August 2022. He was ill for a long time, and after a kidney transplant, he was again admitted to the AIIMS.
