= Gopalganj subdivision =

Administrative subdivision in Gopalganj district, Bihar, India

Gopalganj Subdivision (Hindi: गोपालगंज अनुमंडल) is one of two subdivisions in the Gopalganj district or India, among the 101 subdivisions of Bihar. It comprises seven blocks of the Gopalganj district. The total area of the subdivision is 1,167 square kilometres (451 mi^{2}), and the total population is 1,489,730.

== Community development blocks of Gopalganj Subdivision ==
CD Block	Hindi name	Area (KM^{2})	Population (2011)
Baikunthpur	बैकुंठपुर	204.11	217,165
Barauli	बरौली	184.38	263,876
Gopalganj	गोपालगंज	195.47	219,527
Kuchaikote	कुचायकोट	251.43	332,041
Manjha	मांझा	141.47	199,452
Thawe	थावे	69.99	116,106
Sidhwaliya	सिधवलिया	120.13	141,563
