= Kataiya, Gopalganj =

Kateya Kataiya
- Town
- Location in Bihar, India
- Coordinates: 26.56952°N 84.09255°E
- Country: India
- State: Bihar
- District: Gopalganj

Population (2001)
  - Total: 17,896

Languages
  - Official: Bhojpuri, Hindi
- Time zone: UTC+5:30 (IST)
- Postal code: 841437
- ISO 3166 code: IN-BR
- Lok Sabha constituency: Gopalganj
- Vidhan Sabha constituency: Bhore

Kataiya is a town and a notified area in Gopalganj district in the Indian state of Bihar.

== Geography ==
Kataiya is located at 26°33′54″N 84°04′39″E.

== Demographics ==
As of 2001 India census, Kateya had a population of 17,9896. Males constitute 52% of the population and females 48%. Kateya has an average literacy rate of 42%, lower than the national average of 59.5%: male literacy is 53%, and female literacy is 30%. In Kateya, 19% of the population is under 6 years of age.
