= Md. Nematullah =

Indian politician

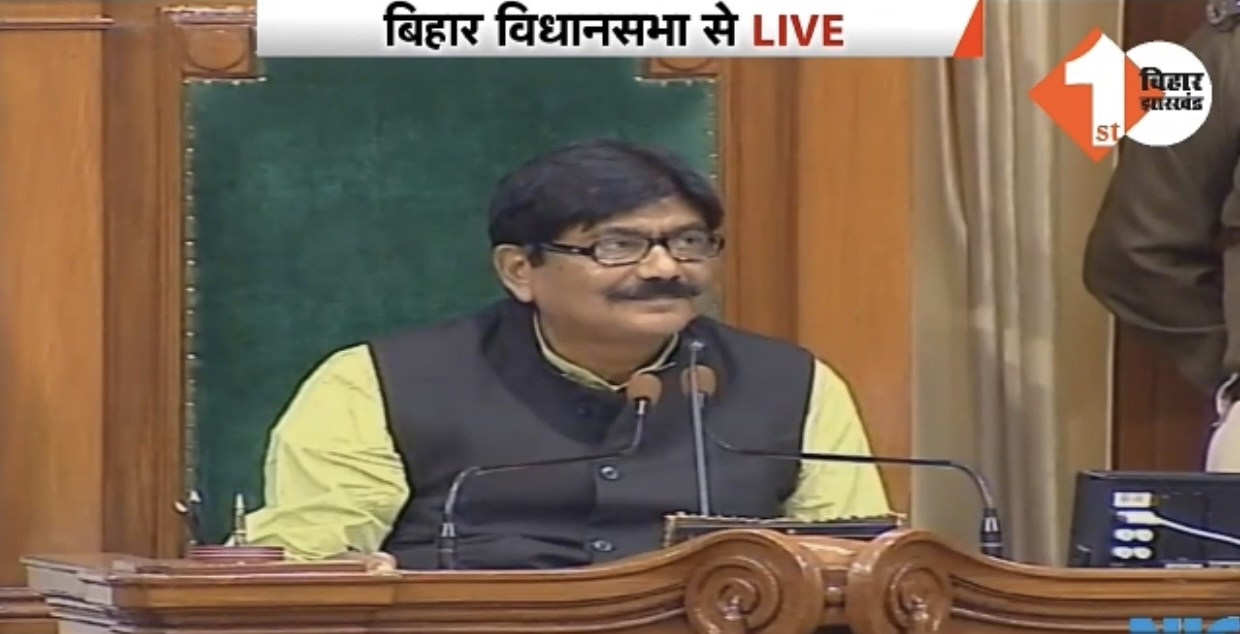
- Md. Nematullah on speaker’s seat in the 16th Bihar Legislative Assembly
- Constituency: Barauli (Gopalganj), Bihar

MLA of Barauli
- In office 1995–2000
- Preceded by: Dhruv Nath Chaudhary
- Succeeded by: Rampravesh Rai
- In office 2015–2020
- Preceded by: Ram Pravesh Rai
- Succeeded by: Ram Pravesh Rai

Personal details
- Born: Siwan, Bihar
- Party: Janta Dal United
- Other political affiliations: Janata Dal, Rashtriya Janata Dal
- Spouse: R. Nemat
- Children: 4 (including Emir Shah)

Md. Nematullah is an Indian politician from Bihar, belonging to Janata Dal (United) aka JD(U). He was also the vice-president of JD(U) between 2009-10. During the general elections in 2009, he was one of the top contenders for contesting from Siwan district.

Previously he was a member of Rashtriya Janata Dal from 1997-2009 and from October 2010 to October 2020. He contested first time in 1995 on Janata Dal ticket and defeated Rampravesh Rai of Bharatiya Janata Party by a whopping margin of 19,802 votes and was elected as a member of Bihar Legislative Assembly from Barauli (Gopalganj). Md. Nematullah got 42,874 votes.

On 5 July 1997, Lalu Prasad Yadav along with other senior leaders and supporters formed the new political party, Rashtriya Janata Dal.

Lalu Prasad Yadav made government with his newly formed political party and became the Chief Minister of Bihar. Later he appointed Md. Nematullah as the Chief Whip of ruling party in Bihar Vidhan Sabha. He’s been a senior leader in RJD until he resigned from the party in October 2020.

He was elected for the second time in 2015 on RJD ticket as a Mahagathbandhan candidate and again defeated Rampravesh Rai with a close margin of only 504 votes. Nitish Kumar became the chief minister of the alliance and later in January 2016, Md. Nematullah was appointed Whip of ruling party in Bihar Legislative Assembly.

Md. Nematullah has been a close ally of Nitish Kumar since his early days in politics. This was stated as one of the major reasons for him joining Janata Dal (United).

== Early life ==
Md. Nematullah finished his primary and secondary education from Siwan/Patna and later graduated from Patna Law College. He’s an MA LLB.

Before getting into politics Md. Nematullah was a Lawyer in Patna High Court. He was known as a senior Criminal Lawyer in the Patna High Court. He practiced regularly until 2015. He’s still a practitioner lawyer but now he takes only selective cases.
