= Pachamwan =

Pachamwan is a village in Gopalganj district in the state of Bihar. It is situated near a beautiful canal flowing throughout the year with fresh water covered, with dense trees. It has a population of around 1000. Most of the male members are working in the Gulf. This village is famous for communal harmony in the district. This village has also produced many officers and professors at state and national level
