= Harpur, Bihar =

Harpur
- Village
- Location within Bihar
- Coordinates: 27.108°N 84.464°E
- Country: India
- State: Bihar
- District: Gopalganj district

Languages
  - Official: Hindi
- Time zone: UTC+5:30 (IST)
- ISO 3166 code: IN-BR

Harpur is a village in Gopalganj district in the Indian state of Bihar.

== Demographics ==
As of 2011 India census, Harpur had a population of 1373 in 296 households. Males constitute 52.58% of the population and females 47.41%. Harpur has an average literacy rate of 48.87%, lower than the national average of 74%: male literacy is 62.59%, and female literacy is 37.4%. In Harpur, 15.87% of the population is under 6 years of age.
