= Raj Mangal Mishra =

Indian politician

Member of Parliament, Lok Sabha
- In office 1989-1991
- Preceded by: Kali Prasad Pandey
- Succeeded by: Abdul Ghafoor
- Constituency: Gopalganj, Bihar

Personal details
- Born: 2 October 1923 Tiwari Chakiya, Gopalganj district, Bihar, British India
- Died: 9 February 1993 (aged 69) Patna
- Party: Janata Dal
- Spouse: Lalita Devi

Raj Mangal Mishra was an Indian politician. He was elected to the Lok Sabha, the lower house of the Parliament of India from Gopalganj, Bihar as a member of the Janata Dal.
