= Kataiya =

Kataiya may refer to:

- Kataiya, India
- Kataiya, Nepal
