= Reyazul Haque Raju =

Indian politician

Member of the Bihar Legislative Assembly
- In office February 2005 – October 2005
- Preceded by: Sadhu Yadav
- Succeeded by: Subhash Singh
- Constituency: Gopalganj

Personal details
- Born: Jangalia, Gopalganj, Bihar
- Party: bahujan samaj party
- Other political affiliations: Janata Dal (United); Bahujan Samaj Party
- Children: 2 sons

Reyazul Haque Raju is an Indian politician from Rashtriya Janata Dal. He entered politics when he was a student.

After the revolt Raju joined the Rashtriya Janata Dal and contested the Assembly Election from Gopalganj on RJD ticket in 2010 and 2015.
