= Hathua, Bihar =

Hathua
- Town
- Location in Bihar, India
- Coordinates: 26°21′14″N 84°17′51″E.
- Country: India
- State: Bihar
- District: Gopalganj

Area
  - Total: 1.06 km^{2} (0.41 sq mi)
- Elevation: 65 m (213 ft)

Population (2011)
  - Total: 7,156
  - Density: 6,750/km^{2} (17,500/sq mi)

Languages
  - Official: Hindi, Urdu
- Time zone: UTC+5:30 (IST)
- PIN: 841436
- ISO 3166 code: IN-BR
- Vehicle registration: BR-28
- Vidhan Sabha constituency: Hathua

Hathua is a census town in Gopalganj district in the Indian states of Bihar.

== Geography ==
Hathua is located at 26°21′14″N 84°17′51″E. It has an average elevation of 65 metres (213 ft). It occupies an area of 1.06 square kilometres (0.41 sq mi).

== Demographics ==
As of the 2011 Census of India, Hathua town had a population of 7,156, of which 3,653 are males while 3,503 are females. Population within the age group of 0 to 6 years was 1,238 which is 17.30% of total population of Hathua town. Hathua had an average literacy rate of 61.5% with male literacy of 55.96% and female literacy was 44.04%.
