= Kuchaikote (community development block) =

Kuchaikote कुचायकोट सामुदायिक विकास खंड
- Community development block
- Location in Bihar, India Kuchaikote (India)
- Coordinates: 26°32′39″N 84°20′27″E
- Country: India
- State: Bihar
- District: Gopalganj

Government
  - Type: Community development block

Population (2011)
  - Total: 332,041

Languages
  - Official: Bhojpuri, Hindi
- Time zone: UTC+5:30 (IST)
- Postal code: 841501
- Vehicle registration: BR 28
- Lok Sabha constituency: Gopalganj
- Vidhan Sabha constituency: Kuchaikote
- Website: gopalganj.bih.nic.in

Kuchaikote (community development block) is one of the administrative divisions of Gopalganj district in the Indian state of Bihar.

== Geography ==
Kuchaikote is located at 26°32′39″N 84°20′27″E.

=== Panchayats ===
The panchayats in the Kuchaikote community development block are Pokharvinda, Kuchaikote, Sherpur, Belbanwa Parsoni Pandey, Mateya Khas, Bantail, Khajuri, Rampur Khareya and Bhoptapur.

== Demographics ==
As per 2011 census, Kuchaikote block had a population of 332,041.

== Economy ==
The economy of Kuchaikote is mainly based on agricultural products such as sugarcane, pulses, and grains. It is known for its advances in horticulture.
