= Swarajya (magazine) =

Indian right-wing magazine

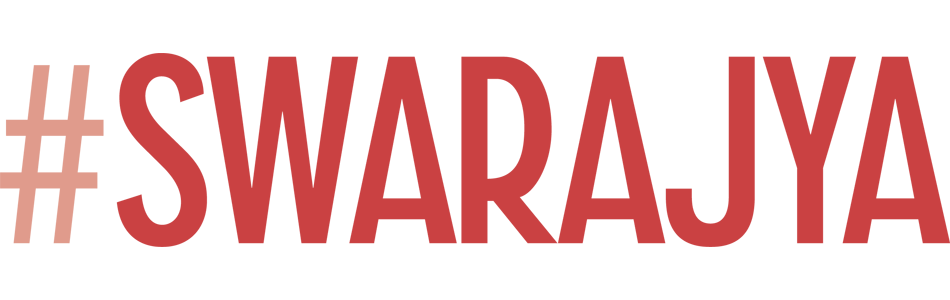

- May 2018 issue
- Editorial Directors: R. Jagannathan; Sandipan Deb
- Editorial Advisory Board: Jerry Rao; Surjit Bhalla; Swapan Dasgupta; Manish Sabharwal
- Categories: News magazine
- Frequency: Monthly (2015–present); Weekly (1956–1980)
- Publisher: V. Murali; Amarnath Govindarajan
- Founder: Khasa Subba Rao
- Founded: 1956
- First issue: 14 July 1956
- Company: Bharathan Publications Private Limited (1956–2014); Kovai Media Private Limited (2014–present)
- Country: India
- Based in: Coimbatore/Bengaluru (2014–present); Chennai (1956–1980)
- Language: English
- Website: swarajyamag.com/about-us
- OCLC: 3999897

Swarajya is an English-language Indian right-wing monthly print magazine and news portal. The publication reports favourably on the Bharatiya Janata Party and has published misinformation on many occasions.

R. Jagannathan is the current editorial director. Originally established in 1956 as a weekly under the patronage of C. Rajagopalachari, it shut down in 1980 but was relaunched in September 2014, as a daily news website; a monthly print magazine was launched in January 2015.

== History ==
Swarajya was launched as a weekly magazine in 1956 by journalist Khasa Subba Rao, under the patronage of C. Rajagopalachari, a prominent independence activist and one of the founders of the Swatantra Party.

The magazine strongly advocated individual freedom and freedom of enterprise as against Nehru's socialist policies. Minoo Masani, Ramaswamy Venkataraman, and R. K. Laxman have contributed to the magazine. After Rajagopalachari's death in 1972, the magazine slowly began to decline and eventually closed in 1980.

=== Relaunch in 2014 ===
The magazine was relaunched as an online daily in September 2014, with Sandipan Deb as the Editorial Director; the first edition of the print magazine was launched in January 2015. Coimbatore-based Kovai Media Private Limited purchased the rights to the magazine from Chennai-based Bharathan Publishers, along with 40,000 pages from the earlier editions of the magazine. The magazine describes itself as "a big tent for liberal right of centre discourse".

In October 2016, it acquired OpIndia; in 2018, it became an independent entity. In 2018, Swarajya launched its Hindi edition.

== Reception ==
The website has misreported news on multiple occasions, according to fact-checkers including Alt News and Boom. Columnists working for Swarajya have allegedly engaged in a variety of trolling over Twitter. Journalists working for Swarajya have propagated communally charged fake news via their personal accounts. Swarajya was blacklisted from English Wikipedia in 2020 alongside OpIndia and Hindu nationalist website TFIpost.
