= Chandrika Ram =

Indian politician

Member of the Bihar Legislative Assembly
- In office 1957–1962
- Succeeded by: Raj Mangal Mishra
- Constituency: Bhorey

Member of Constituent Assembly of India
- In office 9 December 1946 – 24 January 1950
- Constituency: Bihar

Personal details
- Born: 2 July 1917
- Party: Indian National Congress

Chandrika Ram (born 2 July 1917) was an Freedom fighter Indian politician. He was a member of the Constituent Assembly of India from Bihar. He was also a member of the Bihar Legislative Assembly.

== Early life and education ==
Chandrika was born in Saran in Bihar. He studied at the Goriakothi HE School and later pursued higher education including a Law degree at Patna University. He is the first law graduate in the state from the Dalit community.

== Freedom struggle ==
He participated in the Quit India Movement in 1942 and was arrested for two and a half months. Earlier in 1941, he became the secretary of the Bihar Provincial Depressed Classes League and later he became its president. In 1946, he was elected to the Bihar Legislative Council on Congress ticket.
