= Thawe Mandir =

Hindu temple in India

Thawe Temple (Mandir)
- थावे मंदिर
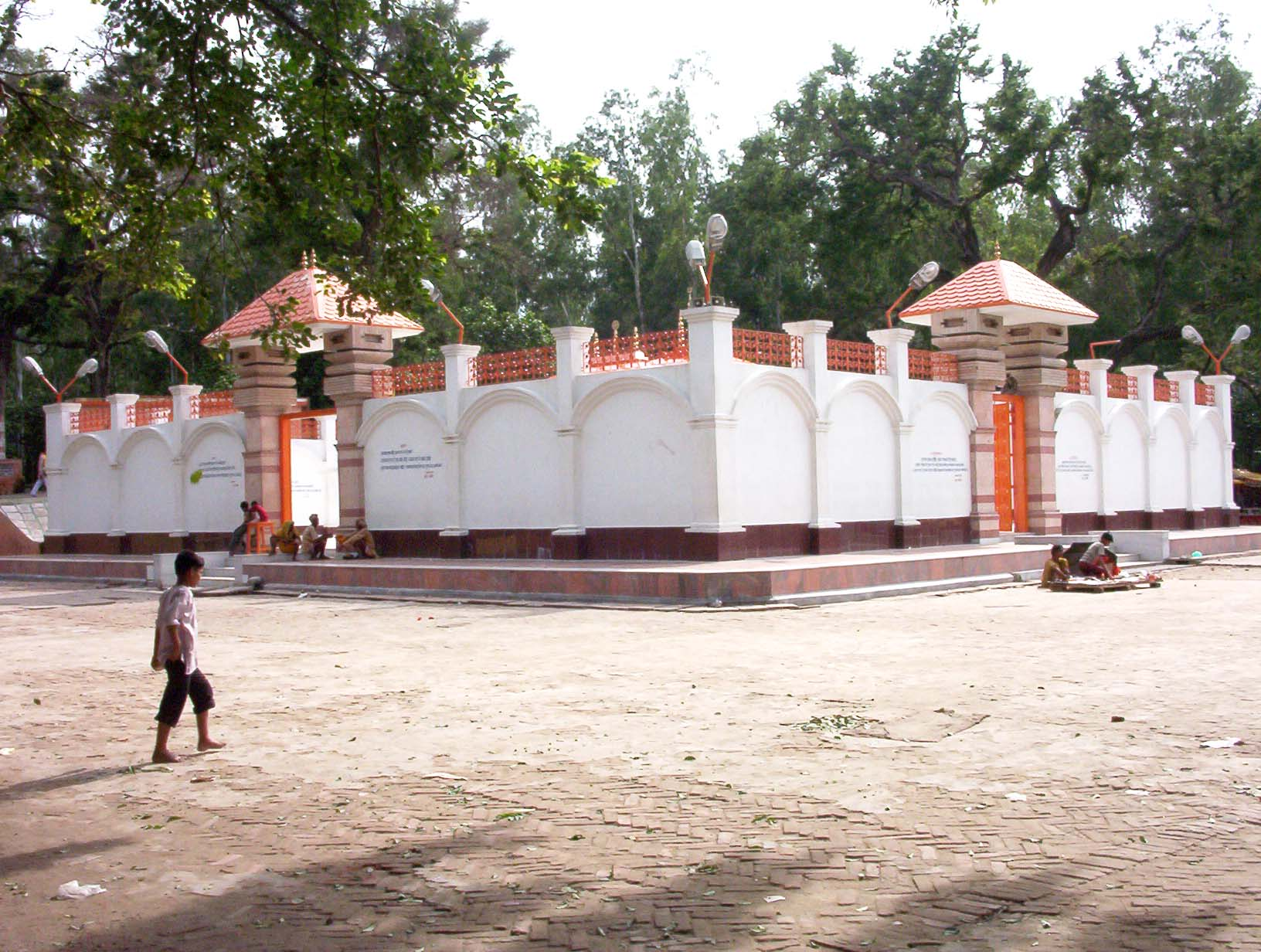

- Location within Bihar

Religion
- Affiliation: Hinduism
- District: Gopalganj

Location
- Location: Thawe
- State: Bihar
- Country: India
- Coordinates: 26°25′45″N 84°23′40″E

Architecture
- Completed: About 14th century

Website
- https://thawemandir.org/

Thawe Mandir, the Temple of Maa Thawewali is situated in Thawe, in Gopalganj District in the State of Bihar, India. It is only 6 km from Gopalganj town on the Gopalganj-Siwan National Highway.

A village is situated 6 km from District headquarters in the south-west direction where there is a junction station “Thawe” of the northeastern railway of the Masrakh-Thawe section and the Siwan-Gorakhpur loop-line. In the village there is an old fort but the history of the fort is obscure it is believed in folklore that once a king called a chamar( the person who work with leather ) once a king called him to his court and asked to call the goddess as previously when there was a drought he had requested her to save the kingdom that was the reason king wanted to see the goddess but due to goddess extreme divine power goddess hand rose out of chmars head and everyone died till today if you request the priest you can touch that hand. The King of Hathwa had a palace there but it is now in decadent state. Close by the residence of the Hathwa Raja there is an old temple dedicated to Goddess Durga. Within the enclosure of the temple there is a peculiar tree, the botanical family of which has not yet been identified. The tree has grown up like the cross. Various legends are prevalent in connection with the idol and the tree. A big fair is annually held in the month of Chaitra (March–April).

== Thawewali Maa ==
There are several names and forms of Maa Shakti. Bhaktas (devotees) worship her by many names in many forms, Maa Thawewali is one of them. There are 52 “Shaktipithas” in all over India, this place is also like a “Shaktipitha”.

The holy place of Maa Thawewali is situated in Thawe in Gopalganj District in Bihar, India. Maa has arrived here from her another holy place Kamrup, Assam where she well known as “Maa Kamakhya” on the prayer of her great devotee “Shree Rahshu Bhagat Ji”. Maa also known as “Singhasini Devi” "Rahshu Bhawani".

In the morning between 5:00am and 7:00 am and in evening 7:00 pm (depends on season) devotees worship Maa with “Laddo”, “Peda”, “Narial” & “Chunari”.

Two days in week, Monday and Friday, are very important for worshiping to please Maa. On these days devotees gather and worship Maa in large number in comparison to other days. The special Mela is organized during two times in year, in the month of “Chaitrya” (March) and “Ashvin” (October) on the great occasion of “Navratra”.

The story of the establishment of thawe Durga Temple is quite interesting. Manan Singh, the king of the Chero dynasty, considered himself a great devotee of Mother Durga, when suddenly there was a famine in the king's kingdom. At the same time, there was a devotee of Mata Rani in Thawe. Then a 16yo boy named sidheshwar found out that magically Rice started coming out when Rahshu ran pater from the tiger. That is why the people there started getting food grains. It reached the king, but the king could not believe it.The king protested against Rahshu and called him a hypocrite and asked Rahshu to call his mother here. On this, Rahshu told the king that if the mother came here, she would destroy the kingdom but did not consider it a king. At the call of Rahshu Bhagat, Goddess Maa walked from Kamakhya and reached Thawe in Gopalganj via Ami of Patna and Saran. All the buildings of the king collapsed. Then the king died. The famous Prasad of Thawe maa Bhawani is- Pidkiyaa
