= Purnmasi Ram =

Indian politician

Member of Parliament, Lok Sabha
- In office 18 May 2009 – 16 May 2014
- Preceded by: Sadhu Yadav
- Succeeded by: Janak Ram
- Constituency: Gopalganj, Bihar

Member of the Bihar Legislative Assembly
- In office 1990–2009
- Preceded by: Triloki Harijan
- Succeeded by: Kailash Baitha
- Constituency: Bagaha

Minister in the Government of Bihar

Personal details
- Born: 5 January 1950 Bihar, India
- Died: 25 February 2026 Patna, Bihar, India
- Party: Janata Dal (United)
- Spouse: Kanti Devi
- Children: 6
- Education: Matriculation; Hindi Vidyapeeth, Deoghar
- Profession: Politician

Purnmasi Ram (5 January 1950 – 25 February 2026) was an Indian politician. He was elected to Bihar Legislative Assembly consecutively five times from 1990. In 2009, he was elected a member of parliament to the 15th Lok Sabha.

In November 2019, he joined forces with IAS officer Gulrez Hoda to launch a new political party Jan Sangharsh Dal, which seeks to represent Dalits and Muslims in Bihar.

== Early life ==
Purnmasi Ram was born on 5 January 1950 to father Mohar Ram and mother Chinegee Devi in Naraipur village, in West Champaran district in the Indian state of Bihar. Purnmasi Ram attended Vidyapeeth school in Deoghar, Jharkhand, and completed matriculation from the school.

== Career ==
Purnmasi Ram was elected to Bihar Vidhan Sabha five times in a row, first in 1990. During his first term, 1990–1995, he was a Minister of State, and a Cabinet Minister for terms from 1995 to 2005 and 2005 to 2009, as a Chairman of Committee on Welfare of Scheduled Castes and Scheduled Tribes. In 2009, he was elected a member of parliament and was a member of the Committee on Food, Consumer Affairs and Public Distribution.

== Personal life ==
Purnmasi Ram married Kanti Devi on 1 January 1968. They have two sons named Ajay and Vijay and four daughters.

== Death ==
Purnmasi Ram was died on 25 February 2026 at Ruban Hospital Patna.
