= Alok Kumar Suman =

Indian politician and member of the 18th Lok Sabha

Dr. Alok Kumar Suman

Member of Parliament, Lok Sabha
- Incumbent
- Assumed office 23 May 2019
- Preceded by: Janak Ram
- Constituency: Gopalganj

Personal details
- Born: Gopalganj
- Party: Janata Dal (United)
- Profession: Social work, Politician, Surgeon

Dr. Alok Kumar Suman is an Indian politician. He was elected to the Lok Sabha, the lower house of the Parliament of India from Gopalganj in the 2019 Indian general election as member of the Janata Dal (United). He is also the National Treasurer of JD(U).

== Early life and education ==
Suman was born in a poor family at Jadopur Dukhaharan, Gopalganj district, Bihar. He worked as child labourer on farms to meet daily needs and to continue his primary education.

After completing high school, he went to Patna Science College for his Indian School Certificate and then did his Bachelor of Medicine Bachelor of Surgery (MBBS) and Master of Surgery (MS) from Patna Medical College and Hospital.

== Career ==
After his education, he worked as a resident doctor in Rammanohar Lohia Hospital, Delhi and retired as deputy director in Govt. of Bihar. He wrote a scientific thesis on "Abdominal Hernia in Children".
