= Janak Ram =

Indian politician

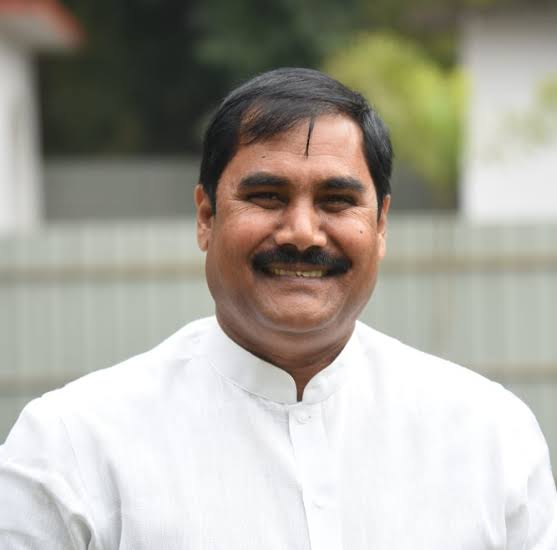

Minister of SC & ST Welfare Government of Bihar
- In office 15 March 2024 – 20 November 2025
- Chief Minister: Nitish Kumar
- Preceded by: Santosh Kumar Suman
- Succeeded by: Lakhendra Kumar Raushan

Minister of Mines & Geology Government of Bihar
- In office 9 February 2021 – 9 August 2022
- Chief Minister: Nitish Kumar
- Preceded by: Jibesh Kumar
- Succeeded by: Rama Nand Yadav

Member of Bihar Legislative Council
- Incumbent
- Assumed office 17 March 2021
- Constituency: Nominated by Governor

Member of Parliament, Lok Sabha
- In office 2014–2019
- Preceded by: Purnmasi Ram
- Succeeded by: Alok Kumar Suman
- Constituency: Gopalganj

Personal details
- Born: 5 December 1973 (age 51) Indrawa, Gopalganj (Bihar)
- Political party: Bharatiya Janata Party
- Spouse: Priyanka (m. 2008)
- Children: 1 son, 1 daughter
- Parents: Rambali Ram (father); Ilayachi Devi (mother)
- Education: M.A.
- Alma mater: Rajendra College, Chapra
- Profession: Politician

Janak Ram is an Indian politician who served as the minister of Scheduled Castes and Scheduled Tribes Welfare in the Government of Bihar. He is a former Member of the Lok Sabha from Gopalganj. He won the 2014 Indian general election as a Bharatiya Janata Party candidate.

== Political career ==
Janak Ram had contested his maiden election in 2014 Indian general election from Gopalganj on a BJP ticket where he emerged victorious by a margin of 2,86,936 votes defeating Jyoti Bharti of Congress. In 2019, he was denied ticket after Nitish Kumar had returned to NDA and the Gopalganj seat had gone to JDU in seat sharing agreement. He was later nominated as the member of Bihar Legislative Council from Governor's quota and was made the Minister of Mines & Geology in Nitish Kumar cabinet from February 2021 to August 2022. On 15 March 2024 he was inducted into Nitish Kumar cabinet and was given the charge of Department of SC/ST Welfare.

== Personal life ==
He is married to Kumari Priyanka and has 1 son, and a daughter.
