= Misha Bharti =

Indian politician

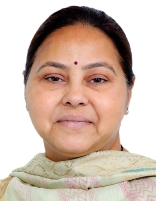

Member of Parliament, Lok Sabha
- Incumbent
- Assumed office 4 June 2024
- Preceded by: Ram Kripal Yadav
- Constituency: Pataliputra

Member of Parliament, Rajya Sabha
- In office 8 July 2016 – 3 June 2024
- Preceded by: Pavan Kumar Varma
- Constituency: Bihar

Personal details
- Born: 22 May 1976 (age 50) Patna, Bihar, India
- Party: Rashtriya Janata Dal
- Spouse: Shailesh Kumar (m. 1999)
- Relations: Tejashwi Yadav (brother); Tej Pratap Yadav (brother); Sadhu Yadav (uncle); Subhash Prasad Yadav (uncle); Tej Pratap Singh Yadav (brother-in-law)
- Children: 3 (2 daughters and 1 son)
- Parents: Lalu Prasad (father); Rabri Devi (mother)
- Education: Patna Medical College and Hospital
- Occupation: Politician

Misa Bharti also known as Misha Bharti (born 22 May 1976) is an Indian politician from the state of Bihar and the daughter of Lalu Prasad and Rabri Devi. In June 2016, she was the party's nominee for the Rajya Sabha biennial elections and was elected unopposed along with Ram Jethmalani from Bihar. She is currently serving as the Member of Parliament from Patliputra.

== Early life and education ==
Misha Bharti was born in 1976 to two former Chief Ministers of Bihar, Lalu Prasad and his wife Rabri Devi. Lalu named his daughter Misa after the Misa Act, due to which he was in prison during the Emergency when she was born. She is the eldest of her parents' nine children (7 daughters and 2 sons).

Misha joined the MBBS course in MGM Medical College, Jamshedpur in 1993 on a TISCO quota, a privilege linked to her father's political influence, despite her lacking any ties to the company. She was later shifted to Patna Medical College Hospital (PMCH) citing security reasons. Misha is alleged to have topped the MBBS exams in gynecology at PMCH through visibly unlawful means. She never practiced as a doctor, citing her commitment to marriage and managing the household as her reasons.

== Personal life ==
Misha Bharti married Shailesh Kumar, a computer engineer, on 10 December 1999. The couple has three children, two daughters and one son.

== Political career ==
Misha Bharti contested 2014 Lok Sabha elections from Pataliputra on a Rashtriya Janata Dal ticket. She lost to Ram Kripal Yadav, former most trusted man of Lalu Prasad. In June 2016, she was the party's nominee for the Rajya Sabha elections and was elected unopposed along with Ram Jethmalani from Bihar. She again contested 2019 Lok Sabha elections from Pataliputra losing to BJP's Ram Kripal Yadav. In Lok Sabha Election 2024, Lalu Prasad's daughter Misha Bharti won from the Patliputra seat by 85,174 votes.

== Criminal cases ==
She was involved in the "land-for-jobs" scam, where it was charged that land was taken from people as a bribe in return for railway jobs when Lalu Prasad Yadav was the Railway Minister (2004–2009). The Enforcement Directorate filed a chargesheet against her, her mother Rabri Devi, her sister Hema Yadav, and two companies, AK Infosystems and AB Exports for money laundering related to this case. A Delhi court accepted the chargesheet and called all of them to appear in court.

An FIR had been filed against Misa, Tejashwi, and others for allegedly offering a Lok Sabha ticket in 2019 in return for Rs 5 crore, based on a complaint by Congress leader Sanjiv Kumar Singh in the Patna CJM court on August 18, 2021. He further alleged that he received death threats after protesting. Her sister-in-law, Aishwarya Rai, who is also the wife of Tej Pratap Yadav, accused Misa to Mahila Police of assaulting her, stealing her jewellery, and creating a rift between her and her in-laws.

== Controversies ==
On March 3, 2015, she claimed to have given a lecture at the India Conference at Harvard University, but this was later debunked by the university, which revealed that she had only purchased a ticket to attend as an audience member.

=== Statements ===
Before the Loksabha election of 2019, Misa expressed in a public gathering that she felt like using a sickle to cut off Ram Kripal Yadav's hands when he had switched his loyalty

Before the Loksabha election of 2024, Misa questioned the need to visit the newly consecrated Ram Mandir. Just a couple of days later, Misa said that if I.N.D.I.A Bloc is granted a chance to rule by the People, Prime Minister Narendra Modi, along with all the BJP leaders, will be in jail. A few days later, she again attacked him referring to him as “ये बूढ़ा प्रधानमन्त्री“ (this aged Prime Minister). A month later, her rival in the constituency, Ram Kripal Yadav, was shot at. He claimed that the attackers were members of her party.
