= Amrendra Kumar Pandey =

Indian politician

- Pappu Pandey

Member of Bihar Legislative Assembly
- Incumbent
- Assumed office 26 November 2010
- Preceded by: constituency reestablished
- Constituency: Kuchaikote
- In office 7 March 2005 – 26 November 2010
- Preceded by: Kiran Devi
- Succeeded by: constituency abolished
- Constituency: Kateya

Personal details
- Born: 5 October 1974 (age 51) Nayagaon, Tulasiya, Gopalganj district, Bihar
- Party: Janata Dal (United)
- Other political affiliations: Bahujan Samaj Party
- Spouse: Ranju Pandey
- Children: 4
- Parent: Ram Ashish Pandey
- Education: Dr. Rajendra Prasad College
- As of 10 November 2020

Amrendra Kumar Pandey, generally known as Pappu Pandey is an Indian politician who has been elected six times member of the legislative assembly from Bihar. He is also serving co-chairman question and attention attraction's limited Bihar assembly. He is also holding the position of State general secretary of Janta dal united (J.D.U). Now he is serving Member of legislative assembly from Kuchaikote constituency of Bihar. In the 2020 general election, he defeated ex member of parliament Kali Prasad Pandey.

== Political career ==
Pandey of JDU represents the Kuchaikote segment in the state legislative assembly of Bihar. In 2001 he become dist. board chairman of Gopalganj. In the 2005 general election, he became a Member of the Legislative Assembly from Bahujan Samaj Party (BSP). Again in the 2005 election held Pandey got a ticket from Janata Dal (United) and won. In 2010 he won the election by defeating Aditya Narayan Pandey..

In 2015 he defeated ex-member of parliament, Kali Prasad Pandey.

In 2020 general election he again defeated ex-member of parliament Kali Prasad Pandey by 20,630 votes.

== See also ==
- Kuchaikote constituency
