= Kusum Devi =

Indian politician

Member Of Bihar Legislative Assembly
- In office 3 November 2022 – 2025
- Preceded by: Subhash Singh
- Constituency: Gopalganj

Personal details
- Party: Bharatiya Janata Party

Kusum Devi is an Indian politician and widow of Subhash Singh who is serving in the 17th Bihar Assembly from Gopalganj Assembly constituency.
