= Linebazar =

Linebazar or Lain Bazar (Village ID 230606) is a small panchayat and village of Hathua block and Gopalganj district, in the state of Bihar in India. Its population is about 60,000. Its pincode is 841438.

It is a halt railway station in newly phulwaria -Patna route. Mirganj is nearest town and junction. According to the 2011 census it has a population of 4229 living in 585 households.

There is one government primary school, Two temples, one mosque and Two madrasas in Line Bazar. There are several public schools here. K.G.N. English Academy/Mother India Public School is oldest and Reliance public school is newest among all schools. There is also a dharmashala (a place where people may stay for short duration free or with nominal charges) in Shiva temple where tourists can stay.
