= Rampravesh Rai =

Indian politician

Minister of Tourism Government of Bihar
- In office 13 April 2008 – 26 November 2010
- Chief Minister: Nitish Kumar
- Preceded by: Nand Kishore Yadav
- Succeeded by: Sunil Kumar Pintu

Member of Bihar Legislative Assembly
- Incumbent
- Assumed office 2020
- Preceded by: Md. Nematullah
- Constituency: Barauli
- In office 2000–2015
- Preceded by: Md. Nematullah
- Succeeded by: Md. Nematullah
- Constituency: Barauli

Personal details
- Born: 20 February 1956 (age 70)
- Party: Bharatiya Janata Party
- Profession: Politician

Rampravesh Rai is an Indian politician from Bihar and a Member of the Bihar Legislative Assembly. Rai won the Barauli Assembly constituency on the BJP ticket in the 2020 Bihar Legislative Assembly election.
