= Barauli, Bihar Assembly constituency =

Barauli
- Constituency No. 100 for the Bihar Legislative Assembly

Constituency details
- Country: India
- Region: East India
- State: Bihar
- Division: Saran
- District: Gopalganj
- Lok Sabha constituency: Gopalganj
- Established: 1951
- Total electors: 284,192
- Reservation: None

Member of Legislative Assembly
- 18th Bihar Legislative Assembly
- Incumbent Manjeet Kumar Singh
- Party: JD(U)
- Alliance: NDA
- Elected year: 2025

Barauli Assembly constituency is an assembly constituency in Gopalganj district in the Indian state of Bihar.

== Overview ==
In the district and a part of the Lok Sabha (parliamentary) constituency named Gopalganj, Barauli is a legislative assembly constituency of Bihar. The Barauli assembly segment is populated by 2,39,638 people who hold the adult franchise to vote in the constituency. There are 1,26,458 male and 1,13,177 female electors in the constituency. As per Delimitation of Parliamentary and Assembly constituencies Order, 2008, No. 100 Barauli Assembly constituency is composed of the following: Manjha community development block; Mohadipur Pakaria, Dewapur, Sonbarsa, Batardeh, Sarfara, Nawada Chand, Kahla, Moghal Biraicha, Kalyanpur, Sarean Narendra, Belsand, Madhopur, Mahammadpur Nilami, Bagheji, Bishunpura, Larauli gram panchayats and Barauli (NA) of Barauli CD Block.

Barauli Assembly constituency is part of No. 17 Gopalganj (Lok Sabha constituency) (SC).

== Members of Legislative Assembly ==
Year	Name	Party
1952	Abdul Ghafoor	Indian National Congress
1957	Abdul Ghafoor	Indian National Congress
1962	Gorakh Rai	Indian National Congress
1967	B. Rai	Independent politician
1969	Bijul Singh	Communist Party of India
1972	Braj Kishore Narayan Singh	Indian National Congress
1977	Abdul Ghafoor	Indian National Congress
1980	Abdul Ghafoor	Indian National Congress
1985	Adnan Khan	Indian National Congress
1990	Dhruv Nath Chaudhary	Independent politician
1995	Md. Nematullah	Janata Dal
2000	Rampravesh Rai	Bharatiya Janata Party
2005	Rampravesh Rai	Bharatiya Janata Party
2005	Rampravesh Rai	Bharatiya Janata Party
2010	Rampravesh Rai	Bharatiya Janata Party
2015	Rampravesh Rai	Bharatiya Janata Party
2020	Rampravesh Rai	Bharatiya Janata Party
2025	Manjeet Kumar Singh	Janata Dal

== Election Results ==
2025 Bihar Legislative Assembly election: Barauli
Party	Candidate	Votes	%	±%
JD(U)	Manjeet Kumar Singh	88,657	45.66	
RJD	Dilip Kumar Singh	76,283	39.29	+0.78
BSP	Reyazul Haque Urf Raju	13,397	6.9	+4.14
Independent	Sonu Kumar	4,804	2.47	
JSP	Faiz Ahmad	2,911	1.5	
Independent	Sita Devi	2,204	1.14	
NOTA	None of the above	4,006	2.06	+1.68
Majority		12,374	6.37	−1.67
Turnout		194,177	68.33	+9.65
JD(U) gain from BJP		Swing		

=== 2020 ===
2020 Bihar Legislative Assembly election: Barauli
Party	Candidate	Votes	%	±%
BJP	Rampravesh Rai	81,956	46.55	+6.43
RJD	Reyazul Haque Urf Raju	67,801	38.51	−1.94
Independent	Rudal Mahato	5,037	2.86	
Independent	Ramesh Kumar Prasad	4,927	2.8	
BSP	Shah Alam	4,856	2.76	+0.87
Independent	Wasim Akram	1,920	1.09	
Independent	Chit Lal Sah	1,790	1.02	
NOTA	None of the above	676	0.38	−0.27
Majority		14,155	8.04	+7.71
Turnout		176,066	58.68	−0.55
BJP gain from RJD		Swing		

=== 2015 ===
2015 Bihar Legislative Assembly election: Barauli
Party	Candidate	Votes	%	±%
RJD	Md Nematullah	61,690	40.45	
BJP	Rampravesh Rai	61,186	40.12	
Garib Janta Dal (Secular)	Anirudh Prasad Urf Sadhu Yadav	3,914	2.57	
Independent	Mukesh Kumar Rai	3,819	2.5	
BSP	Neyaz Ahmad	2,887	1.89	
SP	Rajesh Kumar Singh	2,770	1.82	
Independent	Dharmendra Kumar Gupta	2,531	1.66	
Independent	Yogendra Bhagat	2,464	1.62	
CPI	Manager Singh	2,311	1.52	
Sarvajan Kalyan Loktantrik Party	Dinesh Kumar	1,853	1.22	
NOTA	None of the above	988	0.65	
Majority		504	0.33	
Turnout		152,510	59.23	

=== 2010 ===
Candidate	Party	Votes	
Rampravesh Rai	Bharatiya Janata Party	45,234	—
Md. Nematullah	Rashtriya Janata Dal	34,820	—
Others	—	—	—

=== 2005 ===
Candidate	Party	Votes	
Rampravesh Rai	Bharatiya Janata Party	26,077	—
Md. Nematullah	Rashtriya Janata Dal	20,919	—
Dr. Adnan Khan	Indian National Congress	17,808	—
Jainath	Independent	7,741	—
Dhanraj Singh	Bahujan Samaj Party	6,260	—
Abrar Siddiqui	Lok Janshakti Party	3,602	—

=== 2000 ===
Candidate	Party	Votes	
Rampravesh Rai	Bharatiya Janata Party	52,085	45.07
Md. Nematullah	Rashtriya Janata Dal	42,360	36.65
Jainath Pd. Yadav	Independent	5,873	5.08
Dr. Adnan Khan	Independent	5,495	4.75
Shamsudin Ali	Bharatiya Jana Congress (Rashtriya)	3,921	3.39
F. A. Khan	Bahujan Samaj Party	2,745	2.38

== Older election results ==
=== Full candidate-wise results (1990–1995) ===
==== 1990 Bihar Legislative Assembly election ====
Candidate	Party	Votes	%
Dhruv Nath Chaudhary	Independent	(see ECI / IndiaVotes)	—
(Other candidates — see ECI)

- Full candidate list available in the ECI statistical report for 1990.*

==== 1995 Bihar Legislative Assembly election ====
Candidate	Party	Votes	%
Md. Nematullah	Janata Dal	(see ECI)	—
(Other candidates — see ECI)

- Full candidate list available in the ECI statistical report for 1995.*
