= Ramsewak Singh Kushwaha =

Indian politician

Ramsewak Singh

Member of the Bihar Legislative Assembly
- In office 2005–2010
- Constituency: Mirganj Assembly constituency

Member of the Bihar Legislative Assembly
- In office 2010–2015
- Constituency: Hathua

Member of the Bihar Legislative Assembly
- In office 2015–2020
- Constituency: Hathua

Minister for Social Welfare, Government of Bihar
- In office 2 June 2019 – 16 November 2020

National General Secretary of Janata Dal (United)
- Incumbent
- Assumed office March 2023

Member of the Bihar Legislative Assembly
- Incumbent
- Assumed office 2025
- Preceded by: Rajesh Singh Kushwaha
- Constituency: Hathua

Personal details
- Party: Janata Dal (United)

Ramsewak Singh is an Indian politician and a member of the Janata Dal (United) (JD(U)) political party. He served as a Member of the Legislative Assembly (MLA) in Bihar Legislative Assembly for four consecutive terms. Singh, who represented the Hathua Assembly constituency, became a minister for the first time in the Nitish government in 2019. Prior to this, he had held the post of Chief Whip of the ruling JD(U) for two terms. He is a resident of Asnand Tola village of Uchkagaon block. Before becoming an MLA, he was also the head of Balesra Panchayat. After winning the election of Mukhiya, he became an MLA for the first time from Hathua Assembly under the symbol of Nitish Kumar's JD(U). This was followed by his four consecutive electoral victories for the membership of Bihar Legislative Assembly.

== Political career ==
Ramsewak Singh is a member of Kushwaha, Koeri caste of Bihar. He has done MBBS and M.D and before joining politics, he was in medical profession. Singh started his political career in 2001 by running for the post of Mukhiya (Head) of Balesra Panchayat of Hathua Assembly Constituency. He won the Mukhiya election by 170 votes. For the first time in February 2005, he won election to the Bihar Legislative Assembly by 7,700 votes on the JD(U) ticket. In the mid-term elections held in November of the same year, he won election again by 8,000 votes. In 2010, he won election by 22,000 votes. Then in 2015, he won a fourth consecutive victory in the election to the state legislature by 23,000 votes.

In 2005, the Hathua assembly constituency was known as Mirganj Assembly constituency. After the delimitation exercise in 2010, the Mirganj constituency ceased to exist as such. Singh won the first assembly election in 2005 from Mirganj as well as a mid-term election later that year, and following its renaming as Hathua, he won two more elections for a total of four consecutive victories from the same constituency. Due to his political achievements, he was made Minister of Social Welfare in 2019.

In the 2020 Hathua Assembly constituency elections, he was defeated by Rajesh Kumar Singh.

In the 2025 Bihar Legislative Assembly elections, he was again fielded by the JDU against Rashtriya Janata Dal leader Rajesh Singh Kushwaha. In this election, he emerged victorious for the third time from Hathua Assembly constituency of Gopalganj district.

== Controversies ==
In 2020, Singh was accused in a murder case involving assassination of a Bajrang Dal activist, Jai Bahadur Singh, who was said to be opposing his candidacy from the ruling party, Janata Dal (United). The grandson of the victim, Dhirendra Singh, lodged a first information report (FIR) in this case in the Mirganj constituency area.

== See also ==
- Ram Balak Singh Kushwaha
- Suraj Nandan Kushwaha
- Satyendra Narayan Kushwaha
