= Gopalganj Assembly constituency =

Coordinates: 26°28′00″N 84°26′00″E

Gopalganj
- Constituency No. 101 for the Bihar Legislative Assembly

Constituency details
- Country: India
- Region: East India
- State: Bihar
- District: Gopalganj
- Established: 1951
- Total electors: 297,051

Member of Legislative Assembly
- 18th Bihar Legislative Assembly
- Incumbent Subhash Singh
- Party: BJP
- Alliance: NDA
- Elected year: 2025
- Preceded by: Kusum Devi

Gopalganj Assembly constituency is an assembly constituency in Gopalganj district in the Indian state of Bihar.

== Overview ==
As per Delimitation of Parliamentary and Assembly constituencies Order, 2008, No. 101 Gopalganj Assembly constituency is composed of the following: Gopalganj and Thawe community development blocks; Bairia Durg, Uchkagaon, Chhotka Sankhe, Harpur, Sakhekhas, Parsauni Khas, Nawada Parsauni, Luhsi, Jhirwa and Dahibhata gram panchayats of Uchkagaon CD Block.

Gopalganj Assembly constituency is part of No. 17 Gopalganj (Lok Sabha constituency) (SC).

== Members of the Legislative Assembly ==
Year	Name	Party
1952	Kamla Rai	Indian National Congress
1957	Kamla Rai	Indian National Congress
1961^	Satyendra Narayan Sinha	Indian National Congress
1962	Abdul Ghafoor	Indian National Congress
1967	Hari Shankar Singh	Samyukta Socialist Party
1969	Ram Dulari Sinha	Indian National Congress
1972	Ram Dulari Sinha	Indian National Congress
1977	Radhika Devi	Janata Party
1980	Kali Prasad Pandey	Independent politician
1985	Surendra Singh	Independent politician
1990	Surendra Singh	Janata Dal
1995	Ramawtar	Janata Dal
2000	Sadhu Yadav	Rashtriya Janata Dal
2005	Reyazul Haque	Bahujan Samaj Party
2005	Subhash Singh	Bharatiya Janata Party
2010	Subhash Singh	Bharatiya Janata Party
2015	Subhash Singh	Bharatiya Janata Party
2020	Subhash Singh	Bharatiya Janata Party
2022^	Kusum Devi	Bharatiya Janata Party
2025	Subhash Singh	Bharatiya Janata Party

^ bypoll

== Election results ==
=== 2025 ===
2025 Bihar Legislative Assembly election: Gopalganj
Party	Candidate	Votes	%	±%
BJP	Subash Singh	96,892	48.72	▲5.23
INC	Om Prakash Garg	67,920	34.15	▲13.77
BSP	Indira Yadav	14,225	7.15	
AIMIM	Anash Salam	8,079	4.15	▼14.88
Independent	Anup Kumar Shrivastava (supported by Jan Suraaj)	5,116	2.57	
SAP	Sahana Khatoon	1,806	0.91	
NOTA	None of the above	2,237	1.12	▲0.55
Majority		28,972	14.57	▼5.98
Turnout		198,872	66.95	▲11.92
BJP hold		Swing		

=== 2022 ===
By polls necessitated by the death of MLA Subhash Singh.

By-election, 2022: Gopalganj
Party	Candidate	Votes	%	±%
BJP	Kusum Devi	70,053	41.6	
RJD	Mohan Gupta	68,259	40.53	
BSP	Indira Yadav	12,214	7.25	
AIMIM	Abdul Salam	8,854	5.26	
Pragatisheel Samaj Party	Sanjay Kumar Prasad	1,964	1.17	
Jan Janwadi Party	Jagmohan Mahto	1,805	1.07	
Independent	Vinay Kumar Rai	1,593	0.95	
NOTA	None of the above	2,170	1.29	
Majority		1,794	1.07	
Turnout		1,68,405	50.81	
BJP hold		Swing		

=== 2020 ===
2020 Bihar Legislative Assembly election: Gopalganj
Party	Candidate	Votes	%	±%
BJP	Subash Singh	77,791	43.49	−2.0
BSP	Anirudh Prasad alias Sadhu Yadav	41,039	22.94	+20.87
INC	Asif Ghafoor	36,460	20.38	
Jan Sangharsh Dal	Abdul Salam	2,450	1.37	
Independent	Lalan Prasad Bind	2,418	1.35	
Independent	Waqar Ahmad	2,277	1.27	
The Plurals Party	Vivek Kumar Chaubey	2,165	1.21	
Independent	Sanjay Choubey	2,015	1.13	
NOTA	None of the above	1,028	0.57	−0.37
Majority		36,752	20.55	+17.61
Turnout		178,862	55.03	−2.73
BJP hold		Swing		

=== 2015 ===
In 2015 Bihar Legislative Assembly election, Gopalganj was one of the 36 seats to have VVPAT enabled electronic voting machines.

2015 Bihar Legislative Assembly election: Gopalganj
Party	Candidate	Votes	%	±%
BJP	Subash Singh	78,491	45.49	
RJD	Reyajul Haque Alias " Raju"	73,417	42.55	
BSP	Jay Hind Prasad	3,565	2.07	
Independent	Om Prakash Singh	3,240	1.88	
Independent	Sunil Pandey	2,937	1.7	
Independent	Surendra Ram	2,844	1.65	
Independent	Dr. Rajesh Kumar Vernwal	1,552	0.9	
NOTA	None of the above	1,618	0.94	
Majority		5,074	2.94	
Turnout		172,533	57.76	
BJP hold		Swing		
