= Mirganj, Bihar =

Mirganj
- Town
- Location in Bihar, India
- Coordinates: 26°21′50″N 84°21′50″E.
- Country: India
- State: Bihar
- District: Gopalganj

Government
  - Body: Nagar parishad

Area
  - Total: 5.48 km^{2} (2.12 sq mi)
- Elevation: 66 m (217 ft)

Population (2011)
  - Total: 26,240
  - Density: 4,790/km^{2} (12,400/sq mi)

Languages
  - Official: Hindi, Urdu
- Time zone: UTC+5:30 (IST)
- PIN: 841438
- ISO 3166 code: IN-BR
- Vehicle registration: BR-28
- Lok Sabha constituency: Gopalganj
- Vidhan Sabha constituency: Hathua

Mirganj is a town and a notified area in the Gopalganj district in the Indian state of Bihar.

== Geography ==
It's located at 26°21′50″N 84°21′50″E. It has an average elevation of 66 metres (217 ft). It occupies an area of 5.48 square kilometres (2.12 sq mi).

== Demographics ==
As of the 2011 Census of India, this town had a population of 26,240, of which 13,427 were males while 12,813 were females. Population within the age group of 0 to 6 years was 4,015 which was 15.30% of the total population of the town. It had an average literacy rate of 65% - higher than the state average of 61.8% - with male literacy of 70%, and female literacy of 59%.
