= Kali Prasad Pandey =

Indian politician (1946–2025)

Member of Parliament, Lok Sabha
- In office 1984-1989
- Preceded by: Nagina Rai
- Constituency: Gopalganj

Personal details
- Born: 28 October 1946 Bhojchhapar village, Kochaikot Taluk, Gopalganj district, Bihar Province, British India
- Died: 22 August 2025 (aged 78) Delhi, India
- Party: Indian National Congress
- Other political affiliations: Lok Janshakti Party
- Spouse: Manjumala Pandey
- Children: 3 sons and 3 daughters

Kali Prasad Pandey

Kali Prasad Pandey (28 October 1946 – 22 August 2025) was an Indian politician From The Indian National Congress. He was elected to the Lok Sabha from Gopalganj in Bihar as an Independent politician.

== Life and career ==
Pandey was previously associated with Indian National Congress from 1969 to 1977 and 1980 to 1984. He was Member of Bihar Legislative Assembly from 1980 to 1984. He was General Secretary Lok Janshakti Party till October 2020 but joined Indian National Congress and got ticket from Kuchaikote seat in 2020 Bihar Legislative Assembly election.

Kali Prasad Pandey died on 22 August 2025, at the age of 78.
