= Bhorey Assembly constituency =

Bhore
- Constituency No. - for the Bihar Legislative Assembly

Constituency details
- Country: India
- Region: East India
- State: Bihar
- District: Gopalganj
- Established: 1957
- Reservation: SC

Member of Legislative Assembly
- 18th Bihar Legislative Assembly
- Incumbent Sunil Kumar
- Party: JD(U)
- Alliance: NDA
- Elected year: 2025

26°27′05″N 84°06′53″E

Bhore Assembly constituency is an assembly constituency in Gopalganj district in the Indian state of Bihar. It is reserved for scheduled castes.

== History ==
It is believed that Bhore is named on the name of a King Bhurishrava (Hindi: भूरिश्रवा) who reigned on this land in Dvapara Yuga (The Age of Krishna). He fought in the great Kurukshetr War in support of Kaurava. He got boon for a magical Elephant which could travel from Bhore to Kurukshetra within one day.

== Overview ==
As per Delimitation of Parliamentary and Assembly constituencies Order, 2008, No. 103 Bhore Assembly constituency (SC) is composed of the following: Bhore, Kateya and vijaipur community development blocks.

Bhore Assembly constituency is part of No. 17 Gopalganj (Lok Sabha constituency) (SC).

== Members of Legislative Assembly ==
| Year | Name | Party |
|---|---|---|
| 1957 | Chandrika Ram | Indian National Congress |
| 1957 | Rambali Pandey | Praja Socialist Party |
| 1962 | Raj Mangal Mishra | Indian National Congress |
| 1967 | Raj Mangal Mishra | Indian National Congress |
| 1969 | Raj Mangal Mishra | Indian National Congress |
| 1972 | Raj Mangal Mishra | Indian National Congress |
| 1977 | Jamuna Ram | Janata Party |
| 1980 | Alagu Ram | Indian National Congress (I) |
| 1985 | Anil Kumar | Indian National Congress |
| 1990 | Indradev Manjhi | Janata Dal |
| 1995 | Indradev Manjhi | Janata Dal |
| 2000 | Acharya Vishwanath Baitha | Bharatiya Janata Party |
| 2005 | Anil Kumar | Rashtriya Janata Dal |
| 2005 | Anil Kumar | Rashtriya Janata Dal |
| 2010 | Indradev Manjhi | Bharatiya Janata Party |
| 2015 | Anil Kumar | Indian National Congress |
| 2020 | Sunil Kumar | Janata Dal (United) |
| 2025 | Sunil Kumar | Janata Dal (United) |

== Election results ==
=== 2025 ===
2025 Bihar Legislative Assembly election: Bhorey
| Party | Candidate | Votes | % | ±% |
|---|---|---|---|---|
| JD(U) | Sunil Kumar | 101,469 | 47.61 | +7.11 |
| CPI(ML)L | Dhananjay | 85,306 | 40.03 | −0.22 |
| JSP | Priti Kinnar | 8,602 | 4.04 | |
| BSP | Surendra Kumar Ram | 6,132 | 2.88 | |
| AAP | Dharmendra Kumar Ram | 4,095 | 1.92 | |
| NOTA | None of the above | 7,517 | 3.53 | −0.85 |
| Majority | | 16,163 | 7.58 | +7.33 |
| Turnout | | 213,121 | 63.13 | +9.15 |
| JD(U) gain from CPI(ML)L | | Swing | | |

=== 2020 ===
2020 Bihar Legislative Assembly election: Bhore
| Party | Candidate | Votes | % | ±% |
|---|---|---|---|---|
| JD(U) | Sunil Kumar | 74,067 | 40.5 | |
| CPI(ML)L | Jitendra Paswan | 73,605 | 40.25 | |
| LJP | Pushpa Devi | 4,520 | 2.47 | |
| JAP(L) | Manoj Kumar Baitha | 4,328 | 2.37 | |
| Bhartiya Jan Nayak Party | Ajay Kumar Bharti | 3,686 | 2.02 | |
| Independent | Dularchand Ram | 3,569 | 1.95 | |
| The Plurals Party | Bishal Kumar Bharti | 3,352 | 1.83 | |
| Jan Sangharsh Dal | Rinki Devi | 3,308 | 1.81 | |
| Independent | Jitendra Ram | 1,790 | 0.98 | |
| NOTA | None of the above | 8,010 | 4.38 | +0.25 |
| Majority | | 462 | 0.25 | −8.61 |
| Turnout | | 182,861 | 53.98 | +1.46 |
| JD(U) gain from INC | | Swing | | |

=== 2015 ===
2015 Bihar Legislative Assembly election: Bhore
| Party | Candidate | Votes | % | ±% |
|---|---|---|---|---|
| INC | Anil Kumar | 74,365 | 44.32 | |
| BJP | Indradev Manjhi | 59,494 | 35.46 | |
| CPI(ML)L | Jitendra Paswan | 14,011 | 8.35 | |
| Independent | Satyajeet Kumar | 3,525 | 2.1 | |
| BSP | Rajendra Ram | 1,764 | 1.05 | |
| NOTA | None of the above | 6,936 | 4.13 | |
| Majority | | 14,871 | 8.86 | |
| Turnout | | 167,777 | 52.52 | |
