= Nagina Rai =

Indian Politician

Member of Parliament, Lok Sabha, Agricultuer And Coperative Minister
- In office 1980-1984
- Preceded by: Dwarika Nath Tiwary
- Succeeded by: Kali Prasad Pandey
- Constituency: Gopalganj, Bihar

Personal details
- Born: Gopalpur
- Died: 10 April 1991
- Party: Janata Dal
- Other political affiliations: Indian National Congress
- Children: 5.mahesh rai .dinesh rai .sanjana rai .ranjana rai.guddia rai

Nagina Rai was an Indian politician. He was elected to the Lok Sabha, the lower house of the Parliament of India from Gopalganj, Bihar. He was also 4 times minister and 3 times M.L.A from congress party. He was murdered on 10 April 1991 and he was also a strongman from gopalganj district.

== See also ==
- List of assassinated Indian politicians
