= Garib Janta Dal (Secular) =

Indian political party

The Garib Janta Dal (Secular) (Hindi: गरीब जनता दल (सेक्युलर), abbreviated GJD(S)) is a political party in Bihar, India. The party was founded by Lok Sabha MP Anirudh Prasad Yadav ('Sadhu Yadav') ahead of the 2015 Bihar Legislative Assembly election. Yadav named former Rajya Sabha MP Brahmadev Anand Paswan as party president.

According to preliminary vote count, GJD(S) gathered 510,279 votes in the 2015 election (1.4% of the statewide vote).
