= Gopalganj, Bihar =

Gopalganj
- Town
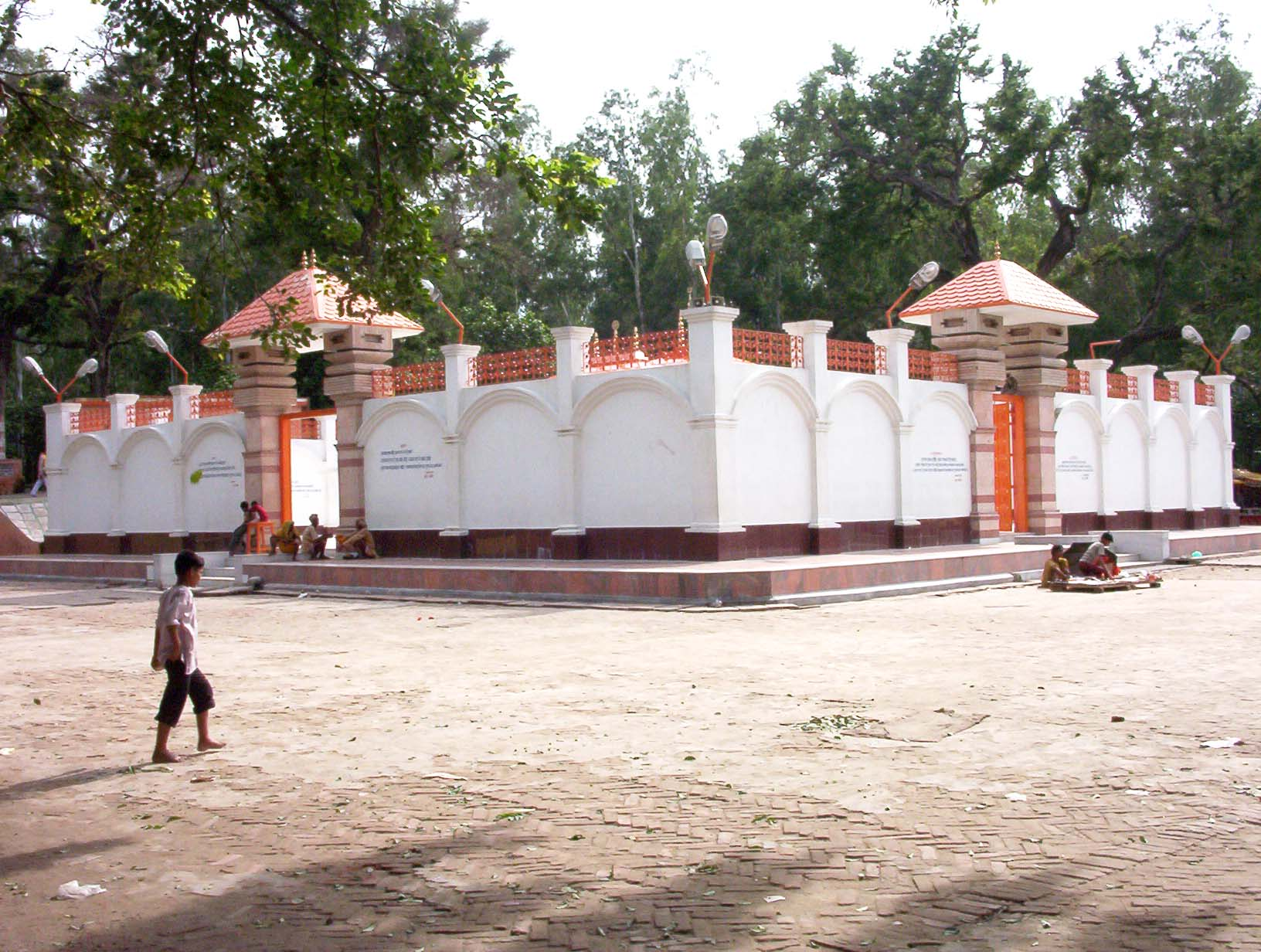
- Thawewali Temple

- Location in Bihar, India
- Coordinates: 26.47°N 84.43°E
- Country: India
- State: Bihar
- District: Gopalganj

Government
  - Body: Nagar Palika

Area
  - Total: 11.11 km^{2} (4.29 sq mi)
- Elevation: 66 m (217 ft)

Population (2011)
  - Total: 67,339
  - Density: 6,061/km^{2} (15,700/sq mi)

Languages
  - Official: Hindi, Urdu
  - Regional: Bhojpuri
- Time zone: UTC+5:30 (IST)
- PIN: 841428
- ISO 3166 code: IN-BR
- Vehicle registration: BR-28
- Lok Sabha constituency: Gopalganj
- Vidhan Sabha constituency: Gopalganj

Gopalganj is a town, municipality and headquarters of Gopalganj district in the Indian state of Bihar.

== Geography ==
Gopalganj Town occupies an area of 11.11 square kilometres (4.29 sq mi). It is located at coordinates 26.47°N 84.43°E Latitude and longitude. It has an average elevation of 66 metres (217 ft). Gandaki River, which often causes flooding, flows southwards. It is surrounded by Muzaffarpur and East Champaran in east, West Champaran in north, Saran and Siwan in south and Kushinagar district of Uttar Pradesh in west.

== Demographics ==
As of the 2011 Census of India, Gopalganj town had a population of 67,339, of which 34,603 are males while 32,736 are females. Population within the age group of 0 to 6 years was 10017 which is 14.88 % of total population of Gopalganj town. Female Sex Ratio is of 1021 against state average of 918 and Child Sex Ratio in Gopalganj town is around 927 compared to Bihar state average of 935. Literacy rate of Gopalganj city is 80.66 % higher than state average of 61.80 % with male literacy of 86.92 % and female literacy rate of 74.07 %.

=== Religion ===
Religions in Gopalganj Nagar Parishad
Religion	Percent
Hindus	79.91%
Muslims	19.67%
Others	0.42%

Majority of the people follow Hinduism (79.91%), followed by Islam (19.67%). Small populations of followers of Christian, Sikhism, Buddhism are also present in the town.

== Transport ==
=== Roads ===
State highways and Road Link district headquarters at Gopalganj to all 14 blocks. National Highway 27 passes through Gopalganj to Mehsi., Muzaffarpur.

=== Railway ===
Connected by Rail with a station at Gopalganj.

== Radio stations ==
Radio Varsha, 90.8 MHz, Rajeev Nagar, Gopalganj.

Radio Rimjhim, 90.4 MHz, Banjari Mor, Gopalganj
