= Gopalganj Lok Sabha constituency =

Lok Sabha Constituency in Bihar

Coordinates: 26.5°N 84.4°E

Gopalganj
- Lok Sabha constituency

Constituency details
- Country: India
- Region: East India
- State: Bihar
- Established: 1952
- Total electors: 20,24,673 (2024)
- Reservation: SC

Member of Parliament
- 18th Lok Sabha
- Incumbent Alok Kumar Suman
- Party: JD(U)
- Alliance: NDA
- Elected year: 2019

Gopalganj Lok Sabha constituency is one of the 40 Lok Sabha constituencies in Bihar state in eastern India. It has been reserved for Scheduled Castes.

== Assembly segments ==
Presently, Gopalganj Lok Sabha constituency comprises the following six Vidhan Sabha (legislative assembly) segments:

#	Name	District	Member	Party	2024 lead
99	Baikunthpur	Gopalganj	Mithlesh Tiwari	BJP	JD(U)
100	Barauli	Gopalganj	Manjeet Singh	JD(U)	JD(U)
101	Gopalganj	Gopalganj	Subhash Singh	BJP	JD(U)
102	Kuchaikote	Gopalganj	Amrendra Pandey	JD(U)	JD(U)
103	Bhore (SC)	Gopalganj	Sunil Kumar	JD(U)	JD(U)
104	Hathua	Gopalganj	Ramsewak Kushwaha	JD(U)	JD(U)

== Members of Parliament ==
Year	Name	Party
1952	Syed Mahmud	Indian National Congress
1957	Syed Mahmud	Indian National Congress
1962	Dwarika Nath Tiwary	Indian National Congress
1967	Dwarika Nath Tiwary	Indian National Congress
1971	Dwarika Nath Tiwary	Indian National Congress
1977	Dwarika Nath Tiwary	Janata Party
1980	Nagina Rai	Indian National Congress (I)
1984	Kali Prasad Pandey	Independent
1989	Raj Mangal Mishra	Janata Dal
1991	Abdul Ghafoor	Janata Dal
1996	Lal Babu Prasad Yadav	Janata Dal
1998	Abdul Ghafoor	Samata Party
1999	Raghunath Jha	Samata Party
2004	Sadhu Yadav	Rashtriya Janata Dal
2009	Purnmasi Ram	Janata Dal (United)
2014	Janak Ram	Bharatiya Janata Party
2019	Alok Kumar Suman	Janata Dal (United)
2024	Alok Kumar Suman	Janata Dal (United)

== Elections results ==
=== General election 2024 ===
2024 Indian general elections: Gopalganj
Party	Candidate	Votes	%	±%
JD(U)	Alok Kumar Suman	511,866	48.15	
VIP	Premnath Chanchal	3,84,686	36.19	
AIMIM	Dinanath Manjhi	29,992	2.82	
NOTA	None of the Above	42,863	4.03	
Majority		1,27,180		
Turnout		10,64,581	52.52	▼3.26
JD(U) hold		Swing		

=== General election, 2019 ===
2019 Indian general elections: Gopalganj
Party	Candidate	Votes	%	±%
JD(U)	Alok Kumar Suman	568,150	55.44	
RJD	Surendra Ram	2,81,716	27.49	
NOTA	None of the Above	51,660	5.04	
BSP	Kunal Kishor Vivek	36,016	3.51	
IND	Dinanath Manjhi	15,600	1.52	
Majority		2,86,434	27.95	
Turnout		10,26,056	55.78	
JD(U) gain from BJP		Swing		

=== General election, 2014 ===
2014 Indian general elections: Gopalganj
Party	Candidate	Votes	%	±%
BJP	Janak Ram	4,78,773	52.99	+52.99
INC	Dr. Jyoti Bharti	1,91,837	21.23	+17.00
JD(U)	Anil Kumar	1,00,419	11.11	−28.53
BSP	Chandradip Ram	16,751	1.85	
BED	Surendra Ram	16,680	1.85	
NOTA	None of the Above	17,841	1.97	+1.97
Majority		2,86,936	31.76	+23.34
Turnout		9,03,583	54.60	+17.91
BJP gain from JD(U)		Swing	+52.99	

== See also ==
- Gopalganj district
- List of constituencies of the Lok Sabha
