= Gopalganj district, India =

District in Bihar, India

Gopalganj district
- District of Bihar
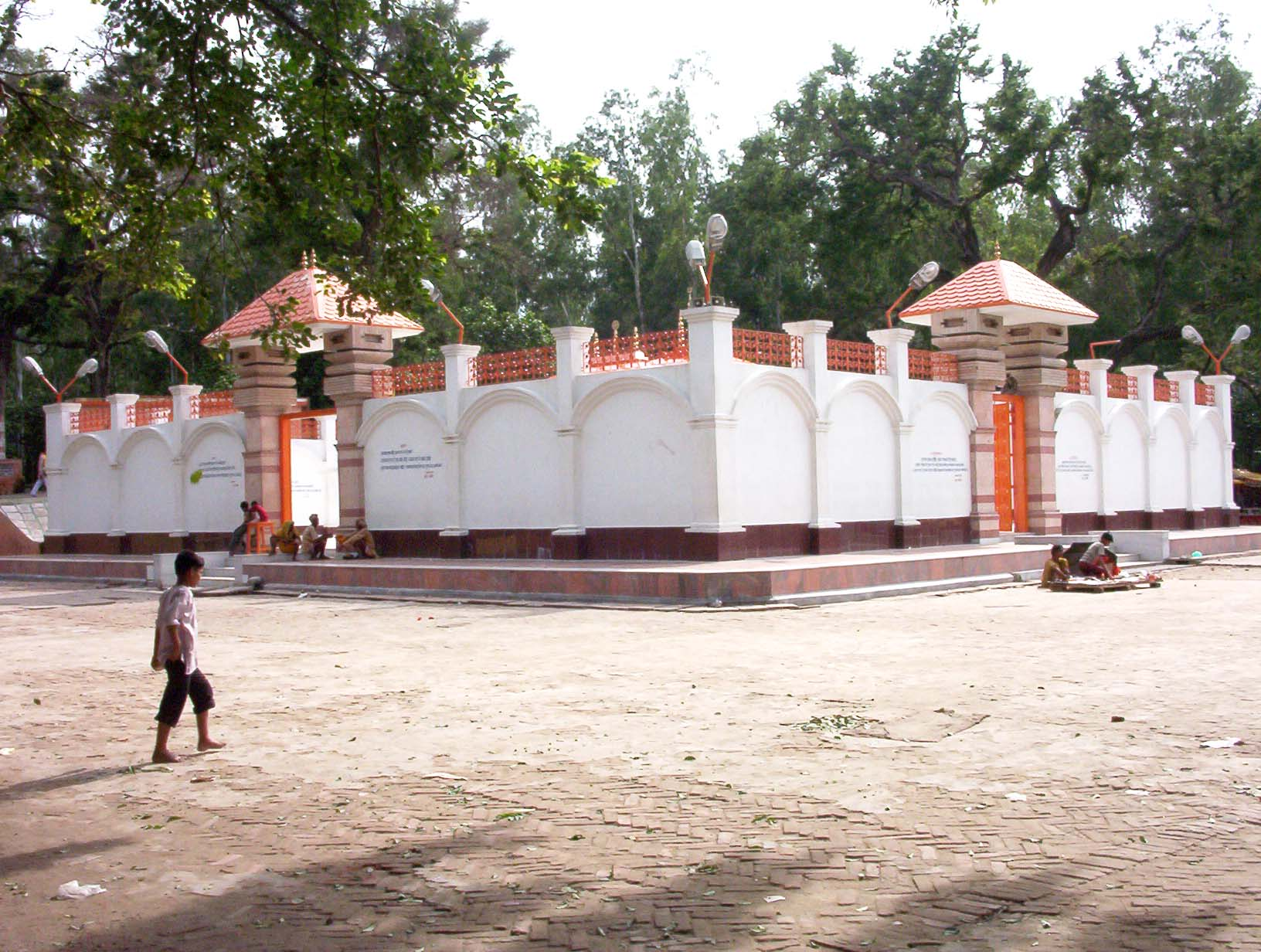
- Exterior of Thawe Mandir
- Interactive map of Gopalganj district
- Coordinates (Gopalganj, Bihar|Gopalganj): 26.4654°N 84.4416°E
- Country: India
- State: Bihar
- Division: Saran
- Headquarters: Gopalganj

Government
  - Lok Sabha constituencies: Gopalganj
  - Vidhan Sabha constituencies: Baikunthpur, Barauli, Gopalganj, Kuchaikote, Bhore, Hathua

Area
  - Total: 2,033 km^{2} (785 sq mi)
  - Rank: 26th in the state of Bihar

Population (2011)
  - Total: 2,562,012
  - Density: 1,260/km^{2} (3,300/sq mi)

Demographics
  - Literacy: 82.9% (2024)
  - Sex ratio: 1021
- Time zone: UTC+05:30 (IST)
- Vehicle registration: BR-28
- Major highways: NH-28
- Website: gopalganj.nic.in

Gopalganj district is one of the administrative districts in the Indian state of Bihar. The district headquarters is the town of Gopalganj, and the district is part of Saran Division. Major languages spoken are Hindi and Bhojpuri. Gopalganj is located in west Bihar.

== Geography ==
Gopalganj district, India occupies an area of 2,033 square kilometres (785 sq mi), comparatively equivalent to Spain's Tenerife Island.

== Demographics ==
Historical population
Year	Pop.	±% p.a.
1901	628,381	—
1911	597,141	−0.51%
1921	610,307	+0.22%
1931	648,526	+0.61%
1941	746,012	+1.41%
1951	822,854	+0.99%
1961	926,736	+1.20%
1971	1,107,464	+1.80%
1981	1,362,123	+2.09%
1991	1,704,310	+2.27%
2001	2,152,638	+2.36%
2011	2,562,012	+1.76%

Religions in Gopalganj district (2011)
Religion	Percent
Hinduism	82.72%
Islam	17.02%
Other or not stated	0.26%

According to the 2011 census Gopalganj district, India had a population of 2,562,012, roughly equal to the nation of Kuwait or the US state of Nevada. of which 1,267,666 are males while 1,294,346 are females. This gives it a ranking of 163rd in India (out of a total of 640). Population within the age group of 0 to 6 years was 449,530 which is 17.54% of total population of Gopalganj district. The district had a population density of 1,260 inhabitants per square kilometre (3,300/sq mi). Its population growth rate over the decade 2001-2011 was 19.02%. Gopalganj had a literacy rate of 65.47% and sex ratio of 1021 females for every 1000 males, Gopalganj ranks first in terms of sex-ratio (1,021) against the state's 918. 6.35% of the population lives in urban areas. The Scheduled Castes and Scheduled Tribes population was 320,064 (12.49%) and 60,807 (2.37%) respectively. Gopalganj district had 411,930 households in 2011.

Languages of Gopalganj district (2011)
1. Bhojpuri (96.1%)
2. Hindi (1.85%)
3. Urdu (1.76%)

At the time of the 2011 Census of India, 96.09% of the population in the district spoke Bhojpuri, 1.85% Hindi and 1.76% Urdu as their first language.

Based on the 2011 census:

- Population: 2,562,012 (2.62% of the state)
- Density of population: 1260
- Men: 1,267,666 (49.48%)
- Women: 1,294,346 (50.52%)
- Urban population: 162,805 (6.35%)
- Rural population: 2,399,207 (93.65%)
- % of Scheduled castes: 12.49%
- % of Scheduled tribes: 2.37%

== Politics ==
District	No.	Constituency	Name	Party	Alliance	Remarks
Gopalganj	99	Baikunthpur	Mithlesh Tiwari	BJP	NDA	
Gopalganj	100	Barauli	Manjeet Kumar Singh	JD(U)	NDA	
Gopalganj	101	Gopalganj	Subhash Singh	BJP	NDA	
Gopalganj	102	Kuchaikote	Amrendra Kumar Pandey	JD(U)	NDA	
Gopalganj	103	Bhore (SC)	Sunil Kumar	JD(U)	NDA	
Gopalganj	104	Hathua	Ramsewak Singh Kushwaha	JD(U)	NDA	

== Administrative Division ==
Gopalganj is divided into 2 sub-divisions, 14 Blocks, 4 municipalities and 234 Gram Panchayats (village councils).

Subdivision	CD Block	Hindi name	Area (KM^{2})	Population (2011)
2	14	१४	2,033	2,562,012
Gopalganj	Baikunthpur	बैकुंठपुर	204.11	217,165
Gopalganj	Barauli	बरौली	184.38	263,876
Gopalganj	Gopalganj	गोपालगंज	195.47	219,527
Gopalganj	Kuchaikote	कुचायकोट	251.43	332,041
Gopalganj	Manjha	मांझा	141.47	199,452
Gopalganj	Thawe	थावे	69.99	116,106
Gopalganj	Sidhwaliya	सिधवलिया	120.13	141,563
Hathua	Bhorey	भोरे	147.73	178,199
Hathua	Hathua	हथुआ	146.65	221,804
Hathua	Kateya	कटेया	126.17	130,830
Hathua	Panchdewari	पंचदेवरी	92.82	99,933
Hathua	Phulwariya	फुलवरिया	95.56	130,801
Hathua	Uchkagaon	ऊँचकागांव	113.29	177,677
Hathua	Vijayipur	विजयीपुर	130.40	133,038

=== Urban councils ===
There are 4 urban areas in Gopalganj district. 3 Nagar Panchayat and 1 Nagar Parishad. Although Hathua is also an urban area categorized as Census town but not counted as municipality.

Urban council	Council's type	Hindi name	part of (Block)	Area (KM²)	Population (2011)
Gopalganj	Nagar Parishad	गोपालगंज	Gopalganj	11.11	67,339
Kataiya	Nagar Panchayat	कटैया	Kataiya	12.06	20,193
Mirganj	Nagar Parishad	मीरगंज	Unchkagaon	5.48	26,240
Barauli	Nagar Parishad	बरौली	Barauli	22.21	41877

=== Village councils ===
There are 234 Gram Panchayats in Gopalganj district grouped into 14 blocks. There are a total of 1566 villages in Gopalganj District. There are 169 uninhabited villages (out of 1,566 total villages) in the district of Gopalganj.

== Constituencies ==
=== Vidhan Sabha Constituencies ===
1. Baikunthpur
2. Barauli
3. Gopalganj
4. Kuchaikote
5. Bhore
6. Hathua

=== Lok Sabha constituencies ===
1. Gopalganj

== Education ==
Initially, Gopalganj had little to offer in terms of good quality education to its residents. Presently Schools and colleges in the city are either run by the government or by private trusts and individuals. The schools are each affiliated with either the Central Board for Secondary Education (CBSE), or the Bihar School Examination Board. English is the medium of instruction in most private schools; though government run schools offer both English and Hindi. The Sainik School prepares boys for entry into the National Defence Academy. After completing their secondary education, which involves ten years of schooling, students typically enroll at Higher Secondary School in one of the three streams—Arts, Commerce or Science. Imperial Public School (located in Hathwa), DAV Thawe and Sainik School are few major CBSE affiliated Schools in the district, providing quality education up to higher secondary level. One Government Engineering college And two Government polytechnic colleges started recently. Government teacher training college, para medical college and Govt ITI colleges setup recently. The Bihar Government announce that the new medical college and hospital will be located in Gopalganj.

== Economy ==
Gopalganj district is famous for sugar industries. Now three Sugar factories are in running position situated in Sasamusa, Gopalganj City and Sidhwaliya. Two grain and sugar cane based ethanol plants recently started their production. Many rice mills, milk packaging plants, mustard oil plants, flour mills, cattle seeds plants, ply factory, egg layer firms, cement bricks plants and many more small scale industries are operational in district. Maximum people depends on agriculture mainly paddy, wheat, sugarcane and vegetables. Government has allotted industrial area in Gopalganj districts in which many factories are coming in next coming years. Gopalganj is at the top in Bihar and ranked among the ten highest districts in India among foreign exchanged currency because many people go to the Gulf countries through the district such as Saudi Arabia, Oman, UAE, Bahrain, Iraq, Qatar, Kuwait and Yemen. Gopalganj is among top ten in per capita income in 38 Districts of Bihar, ranked 7 last year ranked by Niti Ayog.

== Transport ==
NH 28 passes through Gopalganj one can find the multiple buses for commuting in state and other state.

Siwan Junction railway station is the main railway station for Gopalganj. Thawe station also serves local passenger other small station: Hathua Road, Sasamusa, Sipaya-(Serves Kuchaikote, Khutwania, Dubey Khariya, Vinod Khariya and nearby Villages), Tamkuhi Road and Gopalganj railway station. Now Thawe to Lucknow, thawe to taranagar and thawe to patna, thawe to gorakhapur train started.

Sabeya Airport, Jay Prakash Narayan Airport Patna and Mahayogi Gorakhnath Airport, Gorakhpur are the nearest commercial airports. Sabeya Airport is now included in the government UDAN scheme. Preliminary paperwork and mapping of the airport area have begun, and boundary identification will soon start.

== Notable people ==
- Ram Dulari Sinha of Indian National Congress, freedom fighter, former Union-Minister and Former Governor of Kerala, and freedom fighter, first Women to attain master's degree from Bihar and the first woman from Bihar to become Governor
- Kamla Rai was Freedom Fighter and two times MLA of Gopalganj in 1952 and 1957. He was the first Chairman of Saran District Board in 1947. He was the Founder of Kamla Rai College, Gopalganj
- Gorakh Rai was Freedom Fighter and renowned Politician.He was MLA from Barauni constituency in 1962
- Mukesh Kumar (cricketer)
- Abdul Ghafoor, former Chief Minister of Bihar, 1973 to 1975
- Lalu Prasad Yadav, former Chief Minister of Bihar and former Rail Minister of India
- Rabri Devi, 1st woman chief minister of bihar
- U. K. Sinha, Chairman of the Securities and Exchange Board of India
- Anurag Kumar, Director, IISc.
- Pankaj Tripathi, actor
- Alok Kumar Suman, MP
- Subhash Singh (politician), Politician.
- Janak Ram, Politician.
- Amrendra Kumar Pandey, Politician.
- Shambhu Sharan Shrivastava, Politician
- Nagina Rai, Member of parliament from Gopalganj Lok Sabha.
- Avinash Tiwary, Actor
