= Maharani (2021 TV series) =

Indian web-series

- Poster of Maharani Season 4
- Genre: Political drama
- Created by: Subhash Kapoor
- Written by: Subhash Kapoor; Nandan Singh; Umashankar Singh
- Directed by: Karan Sharma (season 1); Ravindra Gautam (season 2); Saurabh Bhave (season 3); Puneet Prakash (season 4)
- Starring: Huma Qureshi; Vipin Sharma; Shweta Basu Prasad; Sohum Shah; Amit Sial; Vineet Kumar; Kani Kusruti; Anuja Sathe; Inaamulhaq
- Music by: Rohit Sharma
- Country of origin: India
- Original language: Hindi
- No. of seasons: 4
- No. of episodes: 36

Production
- Producers: Naren Kumar; Dimple Kharbanda
- Cinematography: Anup Singh (season 2) [Anurag Solanki] (season 4)
- Editor: Kunal Walve
- Running time: 33–67 minutes
- Production company: Kangra Talkies

Original release
- Network: SonyLIV
- Release: 28 May 2021 – present

Maharani (transl. Empress) is an Indian Hindi-language political drama streaming television series created by Subhash Kapoor. Four seasons of the web series have been released with Huma Qureshi portraying the title character.

Season 1 of the series is directed by Karan Sharma, Season 2 by Ravindra Gautam and Season 3 by Saurabh Bhave.

The series stars Huma Qureshi along with Sohum Shah, Amit Sial, Kani Kusruti and Inaamulhaq.

The multi-seasons political series is partly inspired by events in Bihar in the 1990s when Lalu Prasad Yadav made his homemaker wife Rabri Devi his successor. The story of season 1 is from 1995 to 1999 and is inspired by real-life events and characters like Ranvir Sena, left-wing militants, Naxalite groups, the Communist Party of India (Marxist–Leninist) Liberation, 1997 Laxmanpur Bathe massacre, Fodder Scam, Brahmeshwar Singh.

The first season premiered on SonyLIV on 28 May 2021.

The story of season 2 is from mid-1999 and is inspired from real-life events and characters like Shilpi-Gautam Murder, Sadhu Yadav, Rajiv Goswami, Shibu Soren, Mohammad Shahabuddin, Indian Political Action Committee (I-PAC) and 2000 Bihar Legislative Assembly election.

The teaser of the second season was launched on 16 July 2022 and the trailer was released on 1 August 2022. The second season was released on 25 August 2022 on SonyLIV.

The third season trailer been released on 19 February 2024. And the season was released on Sony LIV on 7 March 2024. It is again inspired by and related with many real life events, including the Jitan Manjhi episode.

The trailer of season 4 released on 9 October 2025, the show completely released on SonyLIV on 7 November 2025.

== Plot ==
This is a fictional story, where Rani Bharti is a homemaker and the wife of Bihar's chief minister Bheema. All she cares about is her house and her husband. She wants to pack her bags and go back to the village after her husband resigns from the post of Bihar's CM. But her life takes a turn when her husband and Bihar's CM is made to announce the name of his successor. While his party members look excited to hear who has been appointed, he makes Rani his successor, leaving everyone surprised.

=== Season 1 ===
After being shot, Bihar CM Bheema Bharti names his wife, Rani, as his successor. Rani was an uneducated woman who was content with her simple ways of life and regular family routine and is suddenly thrust into the world of government files she cannot read, corruption, and caste massacres across the state. Amid caste arithmetic, traditional satraps, and emerging voices of dissent, can an illiterate women like Rani Bharti survive the turbulent world of politics?

=== Season 2 ===
As Bheema Bharti runs a proxy government from prison, CM Rani Bharti is accused of misgovernance while Bihar fights anti-incumbency, jungle raj, and corruption. Lawlessness has gripped the state of Bihar and the opposition holds Rani responsible for the state's ‘jungle raj’.

Facing a constant turmoil of opposition from her own party and dealing with a husband and political enemies who are obstinately plotting to overthrow her government, she is forced to make some moves that will disrupt the whole political scenario. With elections right around the corner, will Rani's acumen turn victorious, given her own husband is her greatest enemy?

=== Season 3 ===
Step into the gripping world of Bihar politics, where Rani finds herself unjustly imprisoned for three long years. Navin Kumar grabs the CM seat. With Bheema Bharti eliminated, the blame falls on Rani and a chilling tale of vengeance unfolds in Season 3.

Prepare for a relentless pursuit of justice, intertwined with personal vengeance and political motives.

=== Season 4 ===
The fourth season of Maharani fast-forwards to 2012, where Rani Bharti reigns as Bihar's two-term Chief Minister and a potential contender for national leadership. In Delhi, Prime Minister Sudhakar Sriniwas Joshi struggles to hold together a collapsing coalition, leading to a political confrontation. As ambitions collide and loyalties fracture, Rani and Joshi find themselves in a high-stakes battle for power that could reshape the country's future. Maharani Season 4 depicts themes of political rivalry, corruption, and changing loyalties within India's coalition era.

== Cast ==
- Huma Qureshi as Rani Bharti, wife of Bihar's chief minister Bheema character inspired by Rabri Devi
- Vipin Sharma as Prime Minister Joshi (Season 4)
- Sohum Shah as Bihar's chief minister Bheema Bharti character inspired by Lalu Prasad Yadav (Season 1–2)
- Amit Sial as Navin Kumar Character inspired by Nitish Kumar, chief of Bihar People's Party
- Kani Kusruti as Kaveri Sridharan, Rani's secretary
- Pramod Pathak as Satyendranath Mishra, RJSP chief secretary
- Inaamulhaq as Parvez Alam (Season 1)
- Vineet Kumar as Gauri Shankar Pandey
- Anuja Sathe as Kirti Singh
- Tanu Vidyarthi as Khyati
- Harish Khanna as Shankar Mahto
- Mohammad Aashique Hussain as Prem Kumar Chaubey
- Sushil Pandey as Kunwar Singh
- Kannan Arunachalam as DGP Siddhant Gautam
- Atul Tiwari as Governor Govardhan Daas
- Pankaj Kashyap (Pankaj Jha) as Diwakar Jha
- Neha Chauhan as Kalpana Kaul, director of political consultancy firm I-ACT (Season 2)
- Anushka Kaushik as Shilpa Agarwal (Season 2)
- Sukumar Tudu as Dulari Yadav (Season 2)
- Robin Das as Ekkal Munda (Season 2)
- Ansha Sayed as Sanjana Dutt, a TV news reporter (Season 2)
- Danish Iqbal as Dilshad Mirza
- Leysan Karimova as Zehra Shaikh
- Dibyendu Bhattacharya as Martin Ekka (Season 2)
- Kumar Saurabh as Sanyasi Rai (Season 2)
- Pranay Narayan as Kamta Prasad
- Agasthya Shanker as Jagganath Tripathi
- Vishwa Bhanu as Hemraj
- Alok Chatterjee as Mukhiya
- Neeraj Kashyap
- Divyashekhar Jha as Shrawan Kumar a.k.a. Shaun (Season 2)
- Shweta Basu Prasad as Roshni Bharti (Season 4)
- Rajeshwari Sachdev (Season 4)
- Darsheel Safary as Surya (Season 4)

== Episode Summary ==
Season	Episodes	Originally released
1	10	May 28, 2021
2	10	August 25, 2022
3	8	March 7, 2024
4	8	November 7, 2025

=== Season 1 (2021) ===
Episode No.	Title	Synopsis	Director	Duration
1	Jaat Na Poocho Sadhu Ki	1998 - Bihar is going through a financial crisis and caste wars are rampant throughout the state. Dileep Ram, a Dalit, is killed by Thakur Saheb, a landlord because Dileep refused to send his wife to work at Thakur's mansion. In reprisal, Naxal leader Shankar Mahto kills Thakur along with eight of his men. This leads to political unrest in Bihar and brings the factionalism in the ruling party out in the open.	Karan Sharma	46 mins
2	Dekh Tamasha Kursi Ka	CM Bheema Bharti survives the fatal attack but is bedridden. RJSP central observer Ramjeevan Bohra informs Bheema that due to his ill health, the party has decided to elect a new CM. Bheema agrees to resign with a condition that if he gets maximum votes then he will announce his successor and Bohra agrees. A triangular fight ensues between Bheema Bharti, Naveen Kumar and Party President Gauri Shankar Pandey.	Karan Sharma	47 mins
3	Ghoonghat Ke Pat Khol Re	Illiterate and shy Rani Bharti is completely out of depth while taking CM's oath in cabinet meeting. She feels extremely humiliated as media roasts her and calls her rubber-stamp CM. She decides not to go to the office but when Bheema's PA Mishra Ji reminds her that her reluctance to take charge as CM could lead to another murder attempt on Bheema, Rani gets the message. She orders DGP to find people who were behind murder attempt on Bheema.	Karan Sharma	57 mins
4	Sadho Yeh Murdon Ka Gaon	CM Rani Bharti faces the first big crisis in the office when Veer Sena, an army of upper-caste people, massacred 37 lower caste people in Laxmanpur village. Rani Bharti gives a 13-day ultimatum to DGP to catch Mukhiya. DGP nabs Mukhiya's right-hand man Kunwar Singh in a daring operation but he refuses to divulge Mukhiya's whereabouts. Meanwhile, Rani gets to know from Finance Secretary Parvez Alam that the state has no money to even pay its employees and all state treasuries are empty.	Karan Sharma	43 mins
5	Kaun Thagwa Nagariya Lootal Ho	Ranchi DM Manak Gupta pays a visit to Machan Baba, a religious leader, and informs him about the Finance Secretary's visit to Ranchi treasury for audit. Machan baba asks him to be alert. Parvez Alam and his Deputy Anjani Srivastav visit the treasury office in the night and find suspicious bills. Parvez reports to CM Rani that Animal Husbandry Dept (AHD) has done fraudulent withdrawals in millions from Ranchi treasury. CM orders him to investigate AHD withdrawals from all 48 treasuries of Bihar.	Karan Sharma	39 mins
6	Na Kahu Se Dosti, Na Kahu Se Bair	Parvez Alam interrogates 4 AHD officials of Ranchi and gets to know withdrawals were done by submitting fake bills of supply of seeds, fodder, medical equipment by companies such as VC Foods. He also gets to know fraud was happening with AHD minister Prem Kumar's approval. Rani confronts Prem and asks for his resignation. Prem reminds her that if he goes, her govt will fall too.	Karan Sharma	47 mins
7	Bahot Kathin Hai Dagar Panghat Ki	Mukhiya with help of SP Nishikant traps and kills ASI Ranjana Kumari, a Naxal sympathizer, who had helped DGP to arrest Kunwar Singh. Shankar Mahto vows revenge. Rani Bharti dismisses Prem Kumar and orders CID investigation into the scam. Infuriated Prem Kumar, on the advice of Gauri Shankar Pandey, leaves RJS party and joins hands with Naveen Kumar along with 8 more MLAs from RJS on the occasion of Makar Sankranti. This brings Rani's Govt into a minority.	Karan Sharma	49 mins
8	Maaya Maha Thagni Hum Jaani	Bheema, who could now walk with the help of a stick, meets Governor and asks him why did he try to kill him? After all, Machan baba couldn't do anything without Governor's approval. Governor reminds him that he had gone back on his words. Bheema offers Governor a deal - that he won't touch Machan Baba and in return, Governor won't call Rani Govt, which was in minority, for floor test as demanded by Naveen. Bheema, true to his word, stops Rani from arresting Machan baba.	Karan Sharma	39 mins
9	Chah Gayi Chinta Miti Manua Beparwah	Rani meets Governor at midnight and demands an explanation. Governor drops a bombshell, tells her Bheema Bharti too was part of the Seed Scam. In fact, 3 years ago, post elections, his party RJSP was short of a majority in the Assembly and Bheema became CM only after he agreed to make Virender Thakur, Governor Protege, and Animal Husbandry Minister in the previous govt, as AHD minister in his government too.	Karan Sharma	35 mins
10	Jo Ghar Phoonke Apnau, Chale Hamaare Saath	Rani confronts Bheema about the scam, death of Virendra Thakur and his association with Naxal leader Shankar Mahto. Bheema says Virender had joined hands with Mukhiya to kill backward caste people and destabilize his govt, so he asked his college friend Shankar Mahto to kill him. Later he made Prem Kumar as AHD minister with approval from Governor. Bheema adds he did nothing wrong as these are small prices to pay for the social change he brought in Bihar.	Karan Sharma	48 mins

=== Season 2 (2022) ===
Episode No.	Title	Synopsis	Director	Duration
1	Jungleraj	Eight months after Rani sent Bheema Bharti to jail from the Assembly floor and promised a fair and transparent administration to the people of Bihar, she is struggling on both personal and professional fronts. Bheema runs a proxy government from jail and there is lawlessness in Bihar. When a young girl is raped and murdered, the opposition dubs Rani's government as Jungle Raj and demands her resignation.	Ravindra Gautam	51 mins
2	Daagi Bane Baagi	As Rani takes steps to get rid of the Jungle Raj in the state, her own party's MLAs rebel against her. Meanwhile, Naveen Kumar meets Govardhan Das to discuss their next move.	Ravindra Gautam	37 mins
3	Vibhajan	RJSP, the ruling party, elects Musafir Baitha as the CM designate. Rani and Naveen eye Jharkhand Jan Party leader Ekkal Munda's support to prove a majority. Bheema walks out of jail and asks Rani to resign. Rani's political move stuns not only her husband but the opposition too.	Ravindra Gautam	47 mins
4	Ashirvaad	Violence erupts and spreads throughout Bihar. Rani imposes Section 144 in the state and orders Naveen's arrest. Ex-Governor Govardhan Das returns to Bihar to investigate the violence. Prem Kumar, out on bail, makes a revelation, which breaks Rani's heart.	Ravindra Gautam	44 mins
5	Vinashkale Viprite Buddhi	Bihar is gripped by a violent uprising that quickly spreads. On the personal front, Rani's heart is broken by a disclosure made by Prem Kumar, who is on bail.	Ravindra Gautam	39 mins
6	Pati Patni Aur Woh	The word of Bheema's love interest gets out to the media while Rani struggles to accept her new reality. Bheema launches a new political party as the elections are announced. Govardhan discloses the truth behind the Siwan violence and Bheema being bombed to Rani.	Ravindra Gautam	47 mins
7	Kingmaker	People cast their votes in the elections. Who will Bihar choose as its next chief minister? Rani, Bheema or Naveen?	Ravindra Gautam	41 mins
8	Shah Aur Maat	Suspense on the formation of the government continues while Naveen brings Bheema an exciting proposal. Bheema throws a Holi party and invites newly-elected MLAs from the RJSP and BVP parties to form a government.	Ravindra Gautam	33 mins
9	Hawamahal	Martin Ekka is appointed as the head of a three-member committee to investigate Bheema Bharti's unexplained death. President's rule is imposed on the state. Mishra decides to unravel the mystery by himself. A new light shines on the case when the committee investigates all the MLAs present at the Holi party.	Ravindra Gautam	33 mins
10	Mastermind	Govardhan Das is reappointed as the Governor of Bihar and calls the single largest party, BPP, to form the government. Martin meets Rani to tell her the truth behind Bheema Bharti's death.	Ravindra Gautam	61 mins

=== Season 3 (2024) ===
Episode No.	Title	Synopsis	Director	Duration
1	Pariksha Ki Tayari	Rani Bharti has spent three years in jail without a trial, while CM Navin Kumar has become popular after introducing liquor ban in the state. The high court hands over Dr Sinha's son Manoj Sinha's murder case to the CBI; however, Dulari Yadav, the main accused is found dead.	Saurabh Bhave	43 mins
2	Andhere Mein	Dulari Yadav's unexpected demise sends shockwaves through Navin's cabinet, breeding mistrust amongst them. Kalanaag, frustrated with the treatment meted out to him by the chief minister, brews a plan to malign Navin's government. Meanwhile, Rani's children are shot at outside the school.	Saurabh Bhave	39 mins
3	Charo Khane Chit	Rani, out on bail, gives a ticket to Dulari's widow, Saroj Yadav, from the Sargunia seat against Kirti Singh, who is the CM's candidate. However, Saroj Yadav loses the bypoll election after news comes out that Rani herself ordered the hit on her kids.	Saurabh Bhave	46 mins
4	Behti Ganga	Kalanaag meets Veer Sena Commander Kunwar Singh and convinces him to sell fake liquor in the state. Martin Ekka is investigating Kirti's husband Sunil Singh's murder and reaches the doorstep of truck driver Mahendra Rai, who is absconding, in Siwan some 100 people die after consuming spurious liquor.	Saurabh Bhave	40 mins
5	Nyay Ya Badla	CM Navin Kumar blames Kunwar Singh and raids his hideout. Dilshad Mirza's right hand man, Iliyas, is kidnapped and, on camera, he confesses to running the biggest liquor syndicate in Bihar. Rani confronts Navin in the Bihar Assembly and demands his resignation.	Saurabh Bhave	43 mins
6	Maati Ka Khilona	As Sanyasi Rai posts bail, Rani vows to bring down Navin's government and decides to celebrate the Sama-Chakewa festival. Meanwhile, Martin and Mishra confront Mahendra Rai, out on bail, and learn the truth behind Sunil Singh's murder.	Saurabh Bhave	35 mins
7	Raj Tilak	Navin is forced to resign as Chief Minister after the double murder and Makhdoomabad hooch tragedy, and announces Kirti's Singh as his successor. The investigative report for both the cases submitted by the Bihar Police reveals a shocking truth.	Saurabh Bhave	41 mins
8	Bihar Ki Maharani	A series of events compels Musafir Baitha to change his mind. When Navin asks him to step down from the Chief Minister's post, he refuses as Rani extends her support to him.	Saurabh Bhave	51 mins

=== Season 4 (2025) ===
Episode No.	Title	Synopsis	Director	Duration
1	File Hai Toh Kursi Hai	Maharani Season 4 opens in 2012 as PM Sudhakar Joshi's coalition nears collapse after losing West Bengal CM's support. Joshi's aide seeks Bihar CM Rani Bharti's backing, but she refuses. As Rani asserts her leadership in Bihar, Joshi allies with her jailed rival, Naveen Kumar, to undermine her. Soon, a commission report implicates Rani in an old murder case, triggering a CBI probe. The episode ends with a charged face-off between Rani and Joshi, setting the stage for a fierce political war.	Puneet Prakash	54 mins
2	Jootam Paijar	Rani Bharti resigns as Bihar's CM after rejecting the Maheshwari Commission's allegations, declaring she will take her fight to Delhi. Her son Jai's growing ambition clashes with the old guard of Rani's party like S N Mishra and Kaveri. Meanwhile, Joshi manipulates Tamil Nadu CM Sunderraja to not switch sides and remain in his coalition. CBI arrives in Patna to arrest Rani, but she secures anticipatory bail. The episode ends dramatically as Rani names Roshni Bharti the new CM.	Puneet Prakash	48 mins
3	Beti Se Baat Karo	There is heavy backlash over Rani Bharti's decision to appoint her daughter as Bihar's CM. Party veterans like Kaveri and Mishra openly question the move, accusing Rani of promoting dynasty politics. As PM Joshi runs a social media campaign called #NangaNepotism against Rani and Roshni, tensions rise. Roshni soon faces funding cuts from the Centre, testing her leadership. In a fiery Assembly speech, she boldly challenges PM Joshi proving, she's more than just Rani Bharti's daughter.	Puneet Prakash	49 mins
4	Vibhishan	The political storm deepens as PM Joshi targets Rani Bharti's family through a coal-mining deal linked to her son Jai. While Rani seeks alliances in Tamil Nadu to counter Joshi, he cunningly manipulates Kaveri - sending her to the UN. Distrust brews within Rani's camp as Jai clashes with Roshni over his business ties with Rishi Agarwal, and Kaveri begins doubting Rani's motives. When Kalanaag warns that Kaveri's betrayal is imminent, Rani is forced to choose between loyalty and survival.	Puneet Prakash	39 mins
5	National Star	Kaveri represents India with a powerful UN speech as Rani and Roshni tighten control in Bihar, cancelling all Akshanta Group contracts tied to Jai. This sparks a family confrontation, leading Rani to placate an angry Jai and enlist him for Delhi's political battle. PM Joshi counters Rani's growing alliance against him by framing CM Sunderraja's family in a scandal. As Rani unveils her new opposition front - Rashtriya Jan Sammaan Morcha - Joshi's sabotage forces Sunderraja to leave her coalition.	Puneet Prakash	43 mins
6	Gathbandhan	The personal and political turmoil in Rani Bharti's world deepens. Jai seeks Aditi's hand, but Balmukund's acceptance comes with a secret condition that could shake Bihar's power structure. As Rani tries to unite allies, Kaveri warns her that Jai is entangled in a coal scam. Kalanaag manipulates Mishra and fuels divisions within Rani's circle. Just as Rani begins to steady her ground, the CED arrests Jai from his own engagement, and PM Joshi dissolves Parliament, calling early elections.	Puneet Prakash	37 mins
7	Personal Is Political	Jai is forcibly brought to Delhi by CED for questioning over alleged money laundering linked to coal block deals. Despite harsh custody conditions, he resists pressure to admit to the charges. Meanwhile, Rani and Roshni uncover Skyron corruption, tracing illicit payments to Nachiket. Jai is granted bail, and Rani nominated him as a candidate in the upcoming elections. Jai exposes Joshi's financial scandals publicly and reveals that Nachiket is the illegitimate son of PM Joshi.	Puneet Prakash	48 mins
8	Takht	Election results end in a hung parliament, plunging Delhi into chaos. Rani prepares to stake claim for power, but betrayal brews within - Kaveri and Mishra rebel, splitting the RJSP. Meanwhile, Jai's secret dealings spiral into tragedy, shaking Rani's world to its core. As Joshi triumphantly returns as Prime Minister, Roshni is arrested, and Bihar slips from Rani's grasp. In a searing final confrontation, a shattered Rani vows vengeance, promising to uncover the truth at any cost.	Puneet Prakash	72 mins

== Production ==
Sohum Shah gained a 12 kg to get look of the politician Bheema, which has been modelled on the basis of Lalu Prasad Yadav. In November 2020, some portions were shot in Kachnariya Kothi, Bhopal. In April 2021, the shooting for web series was also done in Legislative Assembly (LA) Jammu complex of the erstwhile Jammu and Kashmir state and Govt. Gandhi Memorial Science College, Jammu. Around 250 local artists from the theatre and cultural department in Jammu and Kashmir were brought in for the web-series. Some drone shots of J.P. Setu and Buddha Smriti Park were also shown in the web series. The shooting of Maharani was completed in seven months.

== Reception ==
=== Critical response ===
==== Season 1 ====
Writing for The Firstpost, Prathyush Parasuraman gave the series 3 stars and stated that Huma Qureshi shines in a sanitised portrayal of Rabri Devi. Rohan Naahar stated in The Hindustan Times that the series is over-plotted yet underwritten. Archika Khurana wrote in Times of India that the web series is engaging at most times.

The Times Of India described it as a "well-structured screenplay", while Biz Asia pointed out how the show brings the importance of virtue to the forefront. Actress Twinkle Khanna praised the performance of Huma Qureshi in the web series. Actor Shatrughan Sinha also praised Maharani and said that Huma Qureshi has the potential of becoming a role model for other artists.

Rishita Roy Chowdhury of India Today said the series is about Saheb, Biwi aur Bihar. Rohit Vats of News18 gave Maharani 2.5 stars. Aditya Menon in The Quint wrote that the web series trid to invert the ‘Jungle Raj’ tag that was put on the Lalu Yadav-Rabri Devi period in Bihar. Saibal Chatterjee of NDTV wrote that Maharani is a passable account of a state fighting steady decline and seeking regeneration.

Shubhra Gupta of The Indian Express stated that Huma Qureshi flourishes in a web series with banal writing.

Subhash. K.Jha called it a taut political drama with surprising twists and turns. Nandini Ramnath of Scroll.in wrote that the cast of Maharani has brilliant performances.

Rony Patra from LetsOTT stated that strong characters and an authentic Bihari milieu coupled with "bombastic dialogues" made the series a gripping watch. Rishita Roy Chowdhury of India Today went on to applaud Huma Qureshi's performance saying" she brings nuances and emotional gradients to her character.

Bollywood Life called it a sensational and intriguing game of political chess. Kriti Tulsiani from ZoomTV wrote that the show boasts of a captivating premise but falls victim to the makers’ linear storytelling approach.

BINGED called it a well-crafted chronicle of a story that needed telling.

Spotboye made the parallel with Scam 1992, calling it another big winner for SonyLIV.

==== Season 2 ====
The Times of India gave it 3.5 stars out of 5 while stating that it is "An enthralling political drama with compelling performances." Shashank Pandey of Dainik Bhaskar also gave the series a 3.5 out of five and hailed it as, ‘Emotion aur entertainment ki Maharani.’ ABP News, with its 4 stars out of 5, mentioned that ‘Maharani continues to rule the world of OTT’.

Abhimanyu Mathur of Hindustan Times remarked ‘Huma Qureshi reigns supreme in a show that is a lesson in how political thrillers should be made.’ Namrata Thakur of Rediff said, ‘The second season of Maharani 2 is bigger, better, and far more brutal’.

TV9 said that the second season was ‘Full of Unexpected twists and turns and gave it 4 stars out of 5.

Zoya Bhatti of ThePrint gave the Huma Qureshi starrer a 3.5 out of 5, commenting "Maharani 2 sees Rani Bharti go from political pawn to queen bee."

Nandini Ramnath from Scroll called the series "Another, more focused, round of self-serving politics." Koimoi’s Shubham Kulkarni also gave the second season 3.5 stars out of 5 and said, "Huma Qureshi Continues To Reign."

==== Season 3 ====
Aditya Sagar of Republic World gave the show a 3/5 rating and an excerpt of his review read - "For someone who is drawn to the thrills of conspiracy, revenge, and drama, packaged as an edge-of-the-seat experience, Maharani 3 makes for a wholesome streaming experience."

Prabhatha Rigobertha in South First wrote- "Maharani Season 3 is a must-watch for those who like political thrillers."

Yatamanyu Narain in News18 said -"In a nutshell, Maharani 3 is a vicious take of revenge and regaining power once again, not quite on the lines of a conventional political drama, quite atypical and insidious even, but quite honest to its unique treatment. The talented bunch of actors adds grittiness to the plot."

=== Season 4 ===
- Yatamanyu Narain of News18 rated the season 3.5 out of 5 stars, writing that “Huma Qureshi and Vipin Sharma shine in a ruthless game of power and betrayal."
- Archika Khurana of The Times of India also gave the season 3.5 out of 5 stars, calling it “a fierce, emotionally layered political drama” led by Huma Qureshi’s commanding performance"
- Pritinanda Behera of India Today also gave the season 3.5 out of 5 stars, writing "If politics fascinates you, 'Maharani Season 4' is a must-watch. And even if it doesn't, the timing, coinciding with the Bihar Assembly Elections, makes it an intriguing mirror to the real world outside your screen."
- Radhika Sharma of NDTV rated it 3 out of 5 stars, noting that “Huma Qureshi brings Bihar politics to New Delhi, mirroring the mood of the nation.
- Deepa Gahlot of scroll.in reviewed the series and wrote "The game of thrones adds monotony as a new player".
- Ahana Tiwari of zeenews rated the series 3 out of 5 stars, describing it as “a power-packed political thriller” and praising Qureshi’s return as Rani Bharti.
- Prathyush Parasuraman of hollywoodreporterindia wrote "Huma Qureshi Confidently Steers The Strongest Season Yet"

=== Controversy ===
After the release of first trailer on 9 May 2021, the Yadav community protested over a dialogue in the series and filed FIR. The makers of series later apologized and removed that dialogue from the web series.

== See also ==
- Madam Chief Minister
- Caste-related violence in Bihar
- Khakee: The Bihar Chapter
- Article 15
