= 2005 Jahanabad prison attack =

Maoist insurgency in Bihar, India

Jahanabad prison break incident
- Part of Naxalite-Maoist insurgency
- 2005 Jahanabad prison attack (Bihar)
- Location: 25°12′45″N 84°59′07″E; Jehanabad district
- Date: 13 November 2005; 20 years ago
- Victim: Ranvir Sena members
- Perpetrator: People's Liberation Gurriella Army

The Jahanabad prison attack, also known as the Jahanabad jail break incident was a naxalite operation, conducted by the members of Communist Party of India (Maoist) against the state of Bihar, on 13 November 2005. In the backdrop of legislative assembly elections being conducted in the state and lack of elected government in power, the state machinery was involved in conducting the elections in free and fair manner. The President's rule (imposed earlier) was being implemented in the state, and the Naxalites found it a good opportunity to conduct this massive operation. As per various reports, around 12 people, all belonging to Ranvir Sena (who were incarcerated in Jahanabad prison) were killed by the naxalites in this incident. This event was not centred around the prison only, which was the centre of operation, but around 1000 Naxalites were inside the city of Jahanabad, who virtually controlled the city for a short span of time. A total of 389 prisoners were freed by the Naxalites in this operation codenamed 'Operation Jailbreak'. Those who were freed, also included Ajay Kanu— a top level Naxal commander, and many of the Maoists. The operation was conducted by People's Liberation Guerrilla Army (India)— a militant underground unit of CPI (Maoist).

== Incident ==
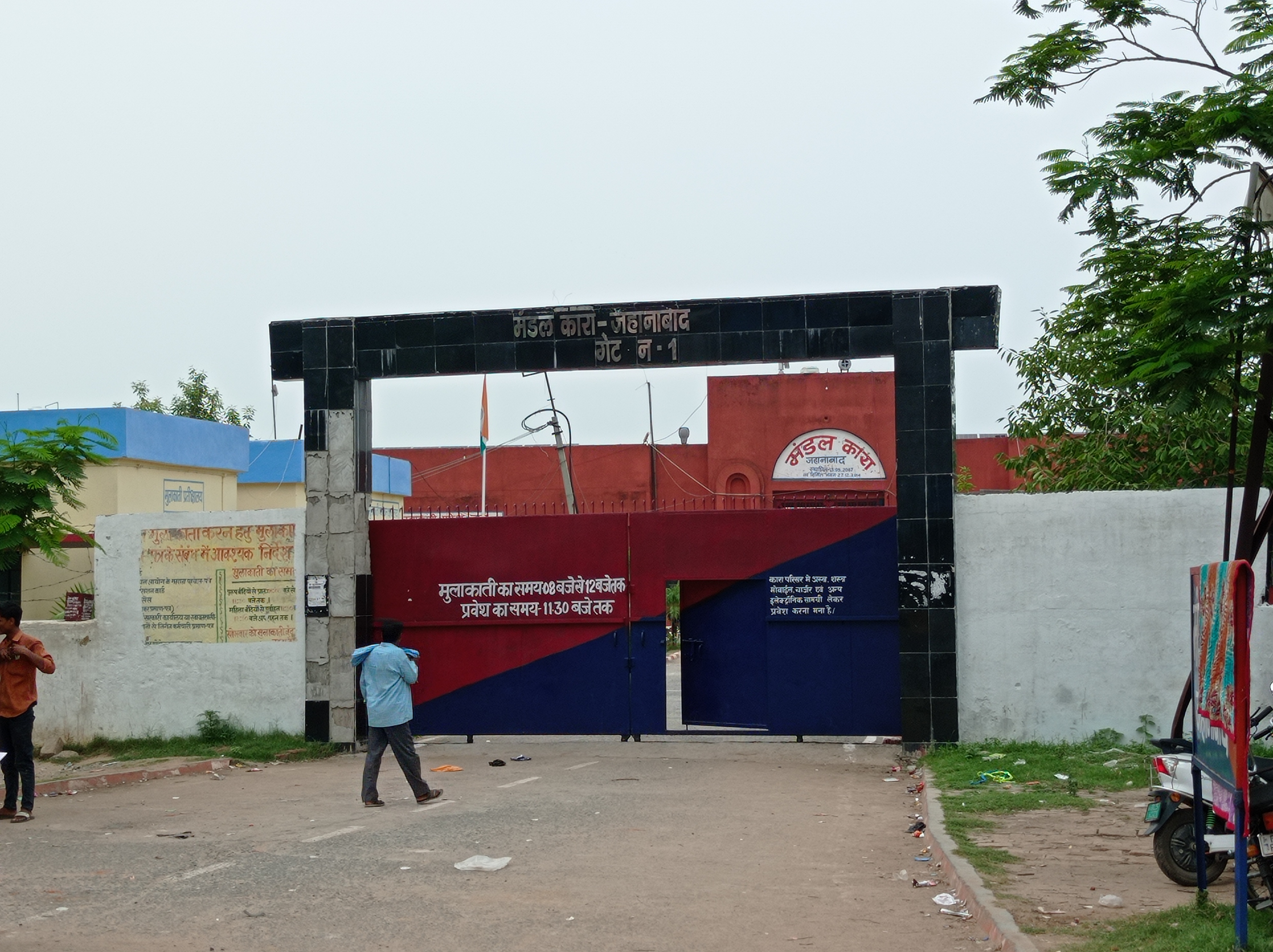
Entrance of Jahanabad prison, which is located in Kako Road, 10 KM ahead of Jahanabad bus stand.

On 13 November 2005, late in the evening, the Naxalites entered the town of Jahanabad in central Bihar. According to estimates, they were over thousand in number. As per various reportings, the Maoists (Naxalites) had arrived on vehicles with 'police' written on them and they were all dressed in police uniform. However, the spectators are said to have witnessed the loose fitting uniforms worn by many of them, which caused suspicion. The attack was pre-planned and before they arrived, the electricity of the whole city went off. Since, in those days, the supply of electricity in the state was erratic and irregular, it appeared to be a normal incident for most of the inhabitants of the city. Some people are reported to have observed the bathroom slippers, below the police uniform, worn by many of the Maoists, which caused uneasiness among them. After entering, they dispersed throughout the city and captured the strategic locations to avoid any counter measures by the state and the security forces.

A band of Maoists, in the vicinity of prison, moved towards the nearby locality announcing the people to stay inside their houses. On megaphones, they announced that, they have no quarrel with the common people and their mission is only against the state administration (Prashashan). Around 9:05 P.M, a bomb was exploded, which was the call to start the operation. The attack was simultaneously made on the police line (the official accommodation provided to the constabulary and lower rank police officials by the Government of Bihar) and the prison. The police line also included district armoury, and at the time of attack, it was ill-equipped due to lack of manpower. Since the elections were going on the state, most of the policemen were on election duty, posted away from the police line.

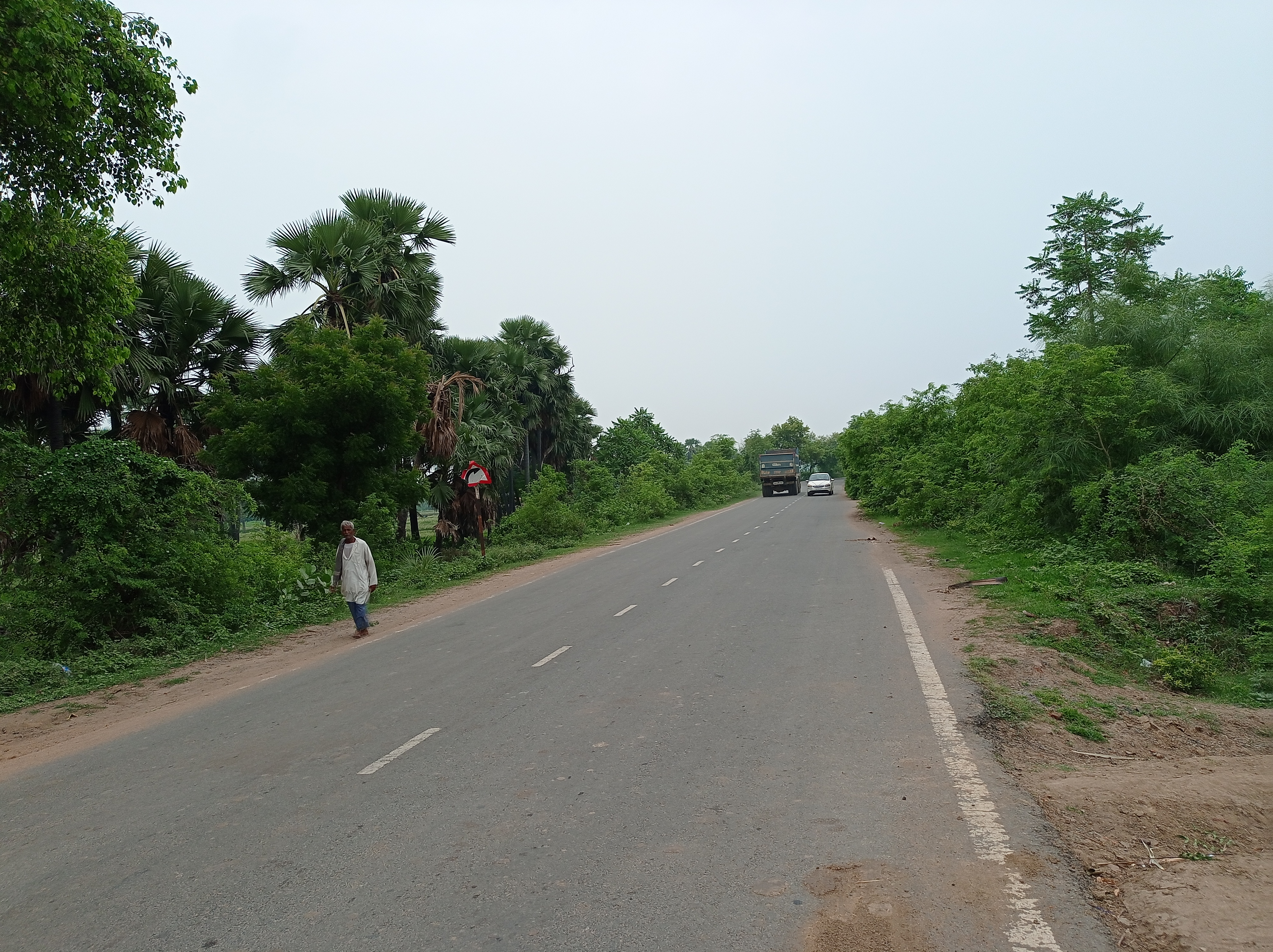
A scene of main route between Jahanabad Bus Station and Jahanabad Prison, located in Kako Road. The main route is connected to many small routes, which traverse across low population density areas, finally connecting to Highway joining nearby Patna and Gaya district.

Jahanabad was surrounded by Gaya and Patna district and for the same reason (policemen sent on election duty) the arrival of reinforcement from these districts was not possible. Some of the Maoists also planned to raid the district armoury, but the District Magistrate's had deployed 8 guards and 11 policemen to save the weapons from being robbed by the Maoists; the Maoists thus played safe and retreated without making any attempt on the armoury. However, latter retreated only after two hours of exchange of fire between them and the authorities. In the south of the police line, there existed a railway track and two Maoists had arrived there possibly with the intent to break the railway track by exploding a bomb. However, after the incident, the authorities found both of them in critical situation; one, who was holding a bomb, that had exploded, was dead and other was severely wounded.

The jail was also suffering from manpower crunch, and when the Maoists attacked it, they started searching for their cadres and leaders incarcerated here. They were successful in finding Ajay Kanu, one of their leading commander and some other supporters. In the meantime, Bade Sharma, one of the leading member of Bhumihar caste led militia Ranvir Sena was found and immediately killed by the Maoists; they also killed another member of Sena, Biseswar Rai, soon after it. According to Bela Bhatia, the attackers also took away 9 Rifles and 376 bullets with them. By next day morning, a total of 389 prisoners had escaped. It was reported that majority of them were petty criminals and they had escaped just to save themselves as they thought that the Maoists were planning to explode the prison altogether.

On 11 December 2005, 269 prisoners among those who escaped, returned to the jail, but the 60-70 hardcore criminals, which included supporters and cadres of left organisations, members of Ranvir Sena and habitual offenders didn't return. One such case was the successful escape of some of the members of criminal "Bindu Singh" and "Chunnu Sharma" groups.

== Situation before attack ==
The problem of overburdening in the Indian prisons was more true in the case of Jahanabad. During the attack, the jail carried 659 inmates, while the original capacity of it was only 140. In past, the members of left movement incarcerated in the jail went on strike for better condition of the inmates. Such a strike was common feature, but according to media reports, the condition was hardly reformed. The jail also housed a majority of undertrial prisoners; only 30 out of all inmates were convicted during the attack. It is also reported that there also existed discrimination between the prisoners on the basis of caste and class. Ajay Kanu had been involved in numerous demonstrations inside the Jahanabad prison for better living condition for all the prisoners, but the administration planned to send troublemakers like him to Gaya jail. However, Gaya jail administration refused to take him and the administration of Jahanabad prison planned to transfer him to Bhagalpur jail. However, before executing the plan, the attack took place.

Bela Bhatia has described the hobnobbing between prison administration and influential criminals, who manage to get into private wards of local government hospitals on the basis of fake medical certificates, living a life of luxury even while serving a sentence. Bhatia interviewed a doctor, who was sent to prison on deputation. According to him, the laxity in providing the medicines for the prison inmates suffering from serious ailments was widely prevalent among the prison staffs. Apart from the poor situation of prison inmates, there were routine massacres of Dalit agricultural labourers in Jahanabad, which incited popular opinion against the state. When Arwal district was carved out of Jahanabad, the infamous Laxmanpur Bathe massacre took place in 1997. Many a times, police also acted in connivance with the upper caste militia, killing Dalits. Hence, there existed accumulated anger among the people against the state administration. The administration also viewed people with suspicion. While discussing about this 'prison break incident', officials present in the police line commented:

Yaha ka sara Janata hi ugarwadi hai (Here everyone is a terrorist)

Bhatia stated that the state administration during those days used to participate in fake encounters on the basis of suspicion of being supporters of the Maoists in complicity with the caste based Senas (Private armies) of the landlords. The incident of prison break and selective targeting of the members of Ranvir Sena resulted in chances of reprisal by latter. Hence, in the aftermath of this event, it was thought that the relative peace that was prevalent for few years due to dormancy of caste based Senas may break as a response to killing of leading commanders like Bade Sharma.

== Aftermath ==
The dead body of the leading member of Ranvir Sena in prison infuriated a section of 'landed gentry'. There was a demonstration on the streets of Jahanabad by latter, in which, they promised to take the revenge from the Naxalites for this killing. Following the incident, Superintendent of Police for Jahanabad district, Sunil Kumar was suspended by government of Bihar, for his failure to prevent the naxal onslaught. According to contemporary news reports, Bihar Home Secretary HC Sirohi had informed SP about possible attack by the extremists earlier, despite this, the district administration was unable to prevent the jailbreak. Government of India rushed over thousand paramilitary personnels to Bihar, after the incident, and a plan to airdrop the security forces was formulated.

In the aftermath of this incident, the Government of Bihar under Nitish Kumar took immediate steps to obtain conviction from many of the Maoists. Between 2007-2009, a total of 109 Maoists were convicted. The speedy trial mechanism was followed by the government to settle many cases related to Maoist activities. However, top naxal leaders like Ajay Kanu were an exception to this. Kanu was arrested in February 2007 by Bihar Police, but speedy trial mechanism was not followed in his case; he was kept under high security in Beur Jail and his property at his native village was confiscated.

According to author Arun Sinha, since most of the Maoist leaders and activists were convicted in retaliatory actions against the landlords and they attacked either landlords or upper caste, who provided tacit support to landlord's militias, Nitish Kumar's government deliberately kept the speedy trial of top naxal leaders pending. By doing so, it wanted to give the Maoists a signal that they are not leveraging their whole power to decimate the existence of Maoists. The government under Kumar was aware of the fact that these Maoists were supported by the lower castes and in case of strict action against them, the lower castes may slide towards extremism, hence they also took steps to bring members of many landlord militia under speedy trial. This step was taken to present a fair image of government to the Maoists.

About 369 cases of violence by upper caste militia was identified and government sent its recommendations to Patna High Court for speedy trial in those cases. As a result of it, sixteen members of Ranvir Sena were sentenced to death in connection with Laxmanpur Bathe massacre. Similarly, for Bathani Tola massacre, three were awarded death sentence and twenty were given life imprisonment. The dual policy of placating Maoists and speedy trial of both private militia of landlords and some of the Maoists, broke the chain of such incidents, bringing peace in long term.

One of the important naxal leader Kaviji, who previously worked as Zonal commander of the Magadh region of the CPI (Maoist) was arrested by Patna police in 2020. Kaviji also known as Krishna Vallabh Lal was hiding in Dahiya village of Patna district and due to lockdown imposed in the state, in course of COVID outbreak, he was not able to move. It was reported that after his arrest, Police had to face difficulties in taking him into custody, as the villagers, after being informed about arrest of naxal commander, stopped the police and clashes between both sides occur.Reportedly, firing from the sides of villagers in support of naxal commander was also done, to which police also retaliated by counter attack. Another accused of prison break, Shankar Rajak also known as 'Baba' died in Beur Jail in 2022. He was suffering from prolonged illness, and was transferred from Gaya to Patna's Beur Jail, for medical treatment. According to his medical reports, he died of kidney failure.

== See also ==
- 1970 Bhojpur uprising
- Pararia mass rape (1988)
- Dalelchak-Bhagaura massacre
- Afsar massacre
- Jehanabad - Of Love & War
