= Caste-related violence in Bihar =

Caste wars of Bihar, India

The Caste based violence in Bihar has a history of conflict between the Forward Castes, who controlled vast swathes of land, and the Lower Castes who were mostly poor. The Zamindari abolition and communist upsurge in Bihar gave rise to a tug of war between upper and the lower castes. The tussle between the Marxists and the landed proprietors was not divided along caste lines as some of the middle peasant castes were also proprietors. The decade of 1960s witnessed communist upsurge in the Bhojpur region of Bihar led by Jagdish Mahto under the banner of Communist Party of India (Marxist–Leninist) Liberation, while the 1990s saw dreaded caste wars. The belligerents were Dalits and poor peasantry of middle peasant castes who were fighting for their rights with the supporters of the status-quo, i.e., upper castes as well as the affluent section of the middle peasant castes (Yadav, Kurmi and Koeri). Its first mass leader was Jagdish Mahto, a Koeri teacher who had read Ambedkar before he discovered Marx, and started a paper in the town of Arrah called Harijanistan("dalit land"). Religious sentiments also became the cause of bitter strife. The violence that happened in Bhagalpur is a precedent.

The mass cremation of the victims of Dalelchak-bhagora massacre 1987, the incident in which as many as fifty people were slaughtered by the "upper backward caste" led militia.

== Bhojpur Killings (1971–76) ==
External videos
- Mobilisation of Dalits by Communist Party of India (Marxist -Leninist) liberation, clashes between caste based militias of upper caste and Naxalites and Emergence of OBC leadership in Bihar. Natakvalas performance art LLP , 8 May 2023

Bhojpur is an historical region in Bihar, known for its association with Ujjainiya Rajputs. The region is also known for the worst form of landlordism, which was the cause of the popular movement Bhojpur rebellion" led by newly educated backward caste youths Jagdish Mahto, Rameswar Ahir, Ramnaresh Ram and Maharaj Mahto. These youths took up arms against the landlord class, when mobilised by the communists. Between 1971 and 1976, as per author Santosh Singh, a large number of Bhumihar landlords and landlords of other upper-castes were killed. After Mahto's death, the movement faded away, bringing long-lasting peace to the region.

== Belchhi massacre 1977 ==
In the 1970s, the Belchhi village in Bihar witnessed one of the severest massacres of Bihar's history. The incident occurred on May 27, 1977, when members of the land-owning Kurmi caste shot dead 11 men with their hands tied, including eight dalits (lower caste) and three members of the backward caste, Sunar. Subsequently, their bodies were burned in a common pyre. Subsequently, based on the testimony of survivor Janaki Paswan, 2 of the accused received death sentences, 11 others were given life sentences. The root cause was caste conflict between Paswan landless peasants and Kurmi landlords. This massacre parted the way between Kurmis and Paswans and made them sceptical of each other's activities. Mahavir Mahto was accused of the carnage in which Dusadh people were the victim.

== Parasbigha and Dohia incidents 1979-80 ==
Parasbigha and Dohia, which were located few kilometres south of Patna, were disturbed since the abolition of Zamindari in 1950. The contest for grabbing more and more lands from the erstwhile Tekari Raj pitted Yadavs and Bhumihars against each other. The Yadavs here sided with Dalits in a long and protracted struggle that reached its zenith in 1979 when an attack took place at Parasbigha by the Bhumihars in which 11 people, including one Yadav, were killed. The Bhumihars attacked in retaliation for the action of Yadav-led Dalit naxalites who beheaded a notorious Bhumihar landlord a few days earlier. Two days after Parasbigha killings, the Yadavs descended upon the Dohia village in search of Bhumihar perpetrators who dispersed soon after the incident of Parasbigha from the latter's village. Since the men were not found, the Yadavs raped their girls, killed an old women and disappeared after looting the village.

According to reports, a total of 2000 people belonging to middle range castes had assembled before the incident of Dohia; they were seeking retaliation for the incident of Parasbigha where Bhumihars were the perpetrators. The mob then entered the Dohia village where a number of Bhumihar families lived; they engaged in mass rape and molestation of the women belonging to many Bhumihar families. Plunder was followed by the beating and abuse of Bhumihar women.

== Pipra Massacre, 1979-80 ==
Pipra is a village in Jehanabad district. Here the landowners are Kurmi, a backward caste. In the past the land owners were Muslim zamindars who left the village during partition with the help of their Dalit kamias, against the wish of many Kurmis who planned to burn the Muslim's houses. Later the zamindars sold their land to the Kurmi buyers who started expecting respect from Dalit workers on a par with older zamindars. With time, Dalits became sympathetic to the Naxal Movement. Things worsened due to a drought in 1978–79, which made their condition desperate. In December 1979, Naxals killed a Kurmi landlord, in retaliation for which on February 25, 1980, heavily armed men attacked Dalit houses in Pipra village. 27 houses were burnt and 5 women, 3 adults and 6 children were killed.

== 1983, Munger massacre ==
In a bloody showdown in Munger district of Bihar on the south bank of Ganges, the Yadavs killed 4 men of the Dhanuk caste . In the same year the Dhanuks in vendetta kidnapped fourteen children of the Yadavs from Piparia village and crossed the river to gather fodder. Except three, all the children were murdered and the dead bodies were chopped into pieces so that they could never be identified.

== Munger-Chhotaki Chhechani-Darmian massacres, 1985 ==
In 1985 in a series of attack and retribution between Rajputs and Yadavs, three subsequent massacres took place in Munger district of Bihar. There was a land dispute between Yadavs and Rajputs. The later had brought Bhinds, a tribal caste for cultivating the disputed land. The Yadavs descended the village on horses and foot and nine people died in the attack. The raiders also plundered four hundred houses of the inhabiting Rajputs. An infant girl was also killed during the raid.

In a separate event in 1986 at Chhotki Chhechani village, Rajput raiders killed seven Yadavs. Following the event, the Yadav in the Darmian village in the subsequent year killed 11 Rajputs in retribution.

== Dalelchak-Bhagaura massacre 1987 ==
In the Dalelchak-Bhagaura village of Aurangabad district of Bihar, the dispute over hundreds of acre of land between Yadav and Rajput community was the principal cause of the carnage, in which over 50 Rajputs were killed by Maoist Communist Centre, an organisation dominated by Yadavs. The massacre also resulted in the exodus of 40 Rajput families and from the village. Chief Minister Bindeshwari Dubey announced the relief for the victim families in the form of government jobs. Later, some of the convicts were given death sentence by the court, while majority of them remained out of reach.

The massacre of Dalelchak-Baguaura is considered as one of the biggest caste based massacre in the history of Bihar along with Laxmanpur Bathe. In this particular incident, which took place in the twin villages of Aurangabad district of Bihar, writers Ashok Kumar and SK Ghosh have mentioned that the massacre of men and women took place after the rapes of the Rajput women by the perpetrators. The writers have talked about rape of women of all ages, even those above 60 years of age. But the other sources only describe brutal killings of men, women and children with no mention of rape.

== 1988 Nonhigarh-Nagwan massacre ==
In 1988, in the Nonhigarh and Nagwan villages, which were located a kilometre away from each other in Jahanabad district, 19 people belonging to Dalit community were killed by unidentified spectators. Both the villages were surrounded by landowning Bhumihar and Yadav caste, but after the incident, the landowners claimed that they didn't listen to any sound of gunshots and they came to know about the killings only after they were told about this by their Dalit neighbours. In response to this incident and inability of landowners (who were earlier given licence for arms) to save the weaker section of their village, Chief Minister Bhagwat Jha Azad decided to penalise the landowners. Besides male members of seven households, which were targeted by fifty attackers, women also received bullet injuries, and two children, six-month-old Pinky and four-year-old Umesh Mochi were also killed. One of the victim, Malti, who lost her husband and two children, asserted that their family had taken land for share cropping from local Bhumihar landlord Rajendra Singh, besides a loan of Rs 1,000. According to her, they were unable to pay the loan and Singh forcibly seized their six quintal grain. Since then, the relationship between them was tensed and probably this was the cause of massacre. However, her neighbours accused her of being a member of Indian People's Front along with all the Dalits of these twin villages.

This incident was followed by visit of Chief Minister, Bhagwat Jha Azad to the villages; during this visit, his face was blackened, reportedly by a member of Indian People's Front, as protest against the incident. Later, a total of 13 people were found guilty by court in this incident, but the main accused Nawal Sharma remained out of reach.

== Danwar-Bihta massacre 1989 ==
Danwar-Bihta massacre took place in 1989 in the Bhojpur district of Bihar. The Upper Caste landlords earlier used to capture the polling booths and made the Dalits vote in favour of their preferred candidates, in order to secure political power in their own hand. The Dalits in the village of Danwar-Bihta took up a resolution in 1989 to vote as per their own wish. The local Rajput landlords thus massacred 23 Dalits in order to punish them. One of the prime accused of the massacre was Jwala Singh, who was important political figure in the region and he is said to have ensured that no Dalit could cast his vote in the forthcoming elections.

== Bhagalpur massacre 1989 ==
In 1989, the ghastly massacre of Muslims in Bhagalpur district of Bihar had its roots originating from the "Ram Mandir movement" at Ayodhya. The trigger to the weeks long communal riots was the incident of Rajpur village, where a procession of Hindus aimed at garnering support for the temple movement was attacked with a Petrol bomb from the local Muslim community. The provocative slogans like "Hindi Hindu Hindustan, Mulla bhago Pakistan"(India is for Hindus, Muslims should go away to Pakistan) & "Jab jab Hindu jaga hai, tab tab katua bhaga hai"(whenever the Hindu has risen, those who are circumcised have run) were shouted by the mob which culminated into the attack finally leading to a long communal strife in which over 1000 people died.

The riots broke out in whole district when rumours of killings of Hindu boys spread. Some of the most affected areas were Logain and Chandheri village, where Muslims were slaughtered and were thrown in wells and buried in cauliflower field respectively. The N.N Singh Committee set up to enquire into the case blamed Chief Minister Satyendra Narayan Singh and his government for not taking required action to save the lives and property. In the infamous Logain massacre (a part of 1989 Bhagalpur violence which occurred in Logain village), which took place on 27 October 1989, a mob guided by Assistant Sub-inspector of Police, Ramchandra Singh massacred 116 Muslims. In 2007, 14 people were convicted in the same case. Almost all the convicts belonged to intermediary Koeri caste. However, the villagers of the 14 convicts charged the verdict as conspiracy. Sunil Kumar Kushwaha, relative of one of the accused, alleged that the police framed the innocent villagers as the perpetrators, as they failed in arresting the real perpetrators, who were outsiders.

== Caste based gangwars in Kosi region 1990-91 ==
In the Kosi region of Bihar, two caste based gangs led by Anand Mohan Singh and Pappu Yadav operated, which were formed to secure the interest of Rajputs and the Backward Castes. In 1991, Anand Mohan organised massive protests against the Mandal Commission's recommendation and in the defiance of the rule of Lalu Prasad Yadav. The members of Yadav's gang in this region terrorised the Rajputs by looting their crops and grazing their fields. The violent campaign of Pappu Yadav in this region led many Rajputs and Bhumihars flee the Yadav dominated villages.

== Bara massacre 1992 ==
In the 'Bara massacre', 37 members of Bhumihar caste were slain by the Maoist Communist Centre. According to the report of India Today, Yadav leaders of Janata Dal were accused of instigating the violence against the Bhumihars after killing of ten Dalits in Barsimha village by "Savarana Liberation Front", an upper-caste organisation. A court later tried the perpetrators. The upper caste retaliated by killing 56 Dalits at Laxmanpur Bathe. One of the main accused of the massacre, Ram Chandra Yadav was proven guilty in March 2023 in a trial Court of Bihar. The Maoist Communist Centre of India claimed that the killings were a response to attack on Dalits elsewhere, by the Savarna Liberation Front, another militant organisation.

== 1993 Ichri massacre ==
In 1993, in the Ichri village of Bihar in the Bhojpur district, five people were killed and several others were injured in an attack by Indian People's Front. The victims, all belonging to Rajput caste were returning from a conference organised by Bhartiya Janata Party. In this massacre, the National General Secretary of Janata Dal (United), Shri Bhagwan Singh Kushwaha, who was a member of Indian People's Front then, was a prime accused. In 2023, 30 years after the incident, some of the accused were granted life imprisonment by a court, while Kushwaha was acquitted due to lack of evidence. The life imprisonment was awarded to Rajendra Shah, Buddhu Shah, Police Mahto, Gauri Mahto, Bahadur Ram, Satyanarayan Ram, Dularchand Yadav, Bhadosa Ram, and Baleshwar Ram under section 302 of Indian Penal Code.

== Chhotan Shukla-Brij Bihari gang wars 1994 ==
Chhotan Shukla was the brother of former MLA of Vaishali, Munna Shukla. He used to operate a gang in the region which was in tussle with the rival gang of Brij Bihari Prasad, an OBC Bania minister in the cabinet of Lalu Prasad Yadav. Prasad was also known for his muscleman image. In an attack by the Prasad gang, Chhotan was killed along with a large number of his associates. In return Prasad was also assassinated. During Chhotan's funeral procession when Gopalganj District Magistrate, G. Krishnaiah was trying to control the furious mob he was beaten up to death by the participants in the procession which are said to be provoked by Anand Mohan Singh and Munna Shukla for doing so.

== Nadhi massacre 1996 ==
In 1996, in the Bhojpur district of Bihar, the infamous Nadhi massacre took place. This massacre resulted in retaliatory attacks by the victim Bhumihars on the Schedule Castes, who were perpetrators of this ghastly massacre, in the same year in another incident. In the Nadhi village, the CPI(ML) unit consisting SCs killed 9 people belonging to Bhumihar caste.

== Bathani Tola massacre 1996 ==
In Bathani Tola, a village located in Bhojpur region of Bihar. The members of Ranvir Sena including people of Bhumihar and Rajput caste killed 21 Dalits. The victims included women, children and infant also. A session court of Arrah inflicted capital punishment upon three perpetrators while other were given life imprisonment. The Patna High Court however acquitted all of them citing lack of evidence as the reason.

== Laxmanpur Bathe massacre, 1996 ==
Laxmanpur Bathe massacre was a sanguinary act of the Ranvir Sena, a militia dominated by Bhumihar caste. In the village called Laxmanpur Bathe, nearly 56 Dalits including women and the children were killed. The trial which followed the massacre revealed the implicit involvement of some of the major political parties and the leaders of the Bihar. It was also claimed that the police force which was deployed there to protect the villagers assisted the Sena members to launch the assault on the Dalits. A team of Human Rights Watch visited the village after the occurrence of Incident; they also interviewed some of the kins of the victims. According to Surajmani Devi– a 32 years old resident of the village:

Everyone was shot in the chest. I also saw that the panties were torn. One girl was Prabha. She was fifteen years old. She was supposed to go to her husband's house two to three days later. They also cut her breast and shot her in the chest. Another was Manmatiya, also fifteen. They raped her and cut off her breast. The girls were all naked, and their panties were ripped. They also shot them in the vagina. There were five girls in all. All five were raped. All were fifteen or younger. All their breasts were cut off.

== 1998 Rampur Chauram massacre ==
In 1998, nine people were killed while returning from the cremation of a fellow villager, Suresh Sharma, in Rampur Chauram village of Arwal district. All the victims belonged to Bhumihar caste. In 2015, a division bench of Patna High Court acquitted fourteen accused of the massacre, due to lack of evidence. Earlier, the convicts were tried at the lower court but they moved to Patna High Court against the decision of trial court. Some of the main accused, out of fourteen acquitted by court, included Ramadhar Yadav, Rampravesh Ram, Umesh Sah, Bhagwan Sah, and Rajkumar Mochi.

== 1999 Usri Bazar massacre ==
In 1999, in Jehanabad district of Bihar, the infamous Usri Bazar massacre took place. The event was a part of a series of attacks and retaliation between Left wing militants and the Ranvir Sena. In this massacre, 7 members of the Bhumihar caste were killed by the militants. In a press statement, the spokesperson of Ranvir Sena Shamsher Bahadur Singh condemned this attack and as per his statement the links of the seven victims with Ranvir Sena was established.

== 1999 Bheempura massacre ==
In the Bheempura village of Jahanabad district, another massacre took place in the year 1999. The victims were members of Bhumihar caste. In this incident, four people were killed by the People's War group— a left wing militant organisation. Leader of Bhartiya Janata Party, Sushil Kumar Modi accused leader of Rashtriya Janata Dal Lalu Prasad Yadav of fomenting the antagonism among the left wing militants, which resulted in this massacre. As per reports and the statement of Modi, Yadav is said to have visited the four villages in the region and was accused of instigating the cadres of the militants to seek revenge against the upper castes.

== Senari massacre 1999 ==
In the Senari village (now in Arwal district of Bihar) the dreaded naxalite organisation MCC killed 34 Bhumihars. The naxalite unit was dominated particularly by Yadav and Paswans. The convicts included Bacchesh Singh, Buddhan Yadav, Butai Yadav, Satendra Das, Lallan Pasi, Dwarika Paswan, Kariban Paswan, Godai Paswan, Uma Paswan and Gopal Paswan, who were later tried by the Session court. The victims were killed using blunt objects with utmost severity.

== Shankarbigha massacre 1999 ==
The infamous massacre led to assassination of 23 Dalit people including men and women of the Shankarbigha village. The prime accused of the carnage were the members of Ranvir Sena, a militia of Bhumihar landlords, while the victims were Dalits. In 1999 most of the accused were acquitted by a court based in Jahanabad.

== Afsar massacre 2000 ==
Afsar massacre was a part of long running caste wars between Bhumihars and the Kurmi-Koeri caste in Nawada and Sheikhpura region of Bihar. Two rival gangs one led by Akhilesh Singh and another one led by Ashok Mahto were active here. These gangs were aligned on the caste lines and drew support from their respective castes. The war claimed 200 lives in all. In this particular incident 12 relatives of Akhilesh Singh, whose wife was an MLA from the region were murdered by the Ashok Mahto gang. The Mahto gang was also responsible for assassination of Rajo Singh, a member of parliament.

== 2000 Lakhisarai massacre ==
This incident, which led to killing of eleven labourers in the Lakhisarai district, was an outcome of gang wars between two caste based criminal gangs of those belonging to Hareram Yadav and Janardan Singh. They represented Yadav and Bhumihar caste respectively. Both the gangs wanted control over sand mining activity in the region and when Janardan Singh intervened to take over the area once controlled by Yadav, the Yadav group retaliated by killing eleven labourers from the side of Singh. In 2014, Yadav who was hiding in Uttar Pradesh, was caught by Bihar Police's Special Task Force. It was reported that before moving to Lucknow, Uttar Pradesh, he also spent considerable time in Nepal.

== Khagaria Massacre 2009 ==
In October 2009, sixteen people, including four children, were dragged out of their huts, tied and gunned down in Bihar's Khagaria district. Out of the 16 dead, 14 people belonged to Kurmi community while 2 belonged to Kushwaha community. While there were suspicions of the massacre being carried out by a Maoist organization, the police claimed that it was a fallout of on old dispute between kurmi-koeris and Musahar community over riverine land. Based on testimonials by the survivors, most of the alleged perpetrators belonged to a dalit caste, Musahar.

== Rohtas riots 2013 ==
In the Baddi village of Rohtas district, the issue of location of a Ravidas temple led to a clash between Rajputs and the Chamars. The villagers belonging to Chamar caste alleged that a mob of Rajputs attacked the village which resulted in death of one person while 54 others including women and children were severely injured. Other sources indicate number of injured to be 40. As per the reports from the victims, it was revealed that the attackers set the Ravidas temple on fire and vandalised the idol. This was followed by sloganeering in the favour of a freedom fighter belonging to Rajput caste and alleged beating of the people belonging to Chamar community. In a briefing given to The Hindu, Sarju Ram, son of an injured victim stated that the location of temple to the centre of village which represents the "assertion of Dalits" led the Rajputs to attack.

== Madhubani massacre 2021 ==
In 2021, on the occasion of Holi festival, a clash happened between the militia called "Ravan Sena", run by members of the Brahmin community and the local Rajput inhabitants in the village called Mahmudpur in Madhubani. The accused, Pravin Jha, was patronized by local leaders of the Bharatiya Janata Party. In this incident, five members of the Rajput caste from the same family, including an ex-armyman, were killed by the Ravan Sena. Amongst those arrested for conspiracy was a non-FIR accused Prahlad Mahto, who was named as he had provided shelter to Jha and his associates.

== 2022 Sujit Mehta murder ==
In 2022, murder of Sujit Mehta— husband of a former member of Zila Parishad, Suman Devi brought Kushwaha (Koeri) and Rajput caste into conflict in Aurangabad district of Bihar. In her statement given to police, Suman Devi accused Akash Singh along others in murder of her husband. It was reported that, Sujit Mehta was also an accused in the murder of Akash's father, Munna Singh. The incident took place in Aurangabad district's region sharing border with Palamu district of Jharkhand. This incident created statewide stir in Bihar and Jharkhand, with members of both Kushwaha and Rajput community organising protest and engaging in verbal attacks on each other on social media. Soon, the rioting spread out on the streets, leading to deployment of security personnels to prevent communal harmony from being deteriorated. Jharkhand's former Member of Legislative Assembly, Kushwaha Shivpujan Mehta was one of the organiser of these protests. While a Rajput caste body was also organising counter protest against the MLA. Two months later, in October 2022, two accused of the murder along with their shooter were arrested from Mumbai.

== Chhapra mob lynching 2023 ==
In February 2023, in the Mubarakpur village of Chhapra, which is located in the Saran district of Bihar, a high-profile mob lynching occurred. It was also based on the caste line, as a local leader of the ruling Rashtriya Janata Dal, Vijay Yadav, who was also the husband of incumbent Mukhiya, was the alleged perpetrator. The violence occurred when three youth belonging to Rajput caste visited his poultry farm and allegedly fired upon him. In retaliation, the youths were beaten brutally by Yadav and his kinsmen, leading to death of a young man named Amitesh Singh. The other Rajput youths got injuries. This case was echoed at the state level by the media and resulted in increase of bitterness among the Rajputs and Yadavs in the Chhapra. Later, second Rajput youth, who was undergoing treatment at a private hospital in Patna after being severely injured also died in course of treatment.

== See also ==
- Caste-related violence in India
- 2018 Bihar riots
- Sunlight Sena
- 2005 Jahanabad prison attack
- 2004 Lahsuna massacre
