= Afsar massacre =

Massacre of Bhumihars by Kurmis in Bihar in 2000

- Part of Caste wars of Bihar
- Location: Nawada, India
- Weapons: Guns and swords
- Deaths: 12
- Victim: Bhumihar
- Perpetrator: Kurmis

The Afsar massacre was a mass shooting and mass stabbing that killed 12 people in the Indian village of Afsar, on 7 June 2000. The massacre was the result of caste wars of Bihar, in this case from clashes between Bhumihars and the Kurmis.

== Trigger ==
The massacre was a vendetta killing undertaken by members of the Kurmi caste against the Bhumihars. Ten days before the massacre, the Bhumihars of Afsar village in central Bihar were involved in killing of eight people from the backward castes. Of these eight people, three belonged to the Kurmi caste, who retaliated by killing twelve members of the Bhumihar community.

Over 50 armed men dressed in paramilitary uniforms entered after midnight and opened fire on 15 people sleeping on a terrace. The killers then captured those who survived the gunshots and slit their throats with long swords. Eleven people died on the spot. Of the remaining four, one died on the way to the hospital. The dead included a four-year-old and a 10-year-old. Two schoolboys who tried to escape, when the firing started, were admitted to the hospital at Patna. According to a report of The Telegraph, the 67-year-old Babulal Sharma who was a survivor of the incident said:

"I was awake the whole night. I heard the footsteps of men climbing up. I thought they could be policemen watching over us because tension was prevailing for some time. Then I heard suppressed gunshots. As I tried to stand up, two gun shots were fired at me,' said Babulal Sharma, a 67-year-old survivor. 'I wanted to die with them. Why did I survive?"

The root of the caste tension lay in the election of Aruna Devi, wife of Akhilesh Singh, as Member of Legislative Assembly for the region. Chief Minister Lalu Prasad Yadav came to the village to assure the victim backward castes of proper compensation and also launch a campaign against Akhilesh Singh as well as the Ashok Mahto gang, which was supposed to have perpetrated the massacre of upper castes at Afsar village. The victims were close relatives of Akhilesh Singh.

== Investigation ==
Earlier it was thought by a large section of media and the families of victims that the massacre was a retaliation by Yadavs for the "Rajobigha massacre", in which five Yadavs were killed by the Bhumihars. But, investigation unfolded the cause of killings to be retaliation by Kurmis who avenged the death of three Kurmis at the hands of Bhumihars. It was reported that the Deputy superintendent of police P.K Mandal aided Mahto gang kill the Bhumihars at Afsar.

Since the formation of Samata Party; Yadav, Kurmi and the Koeri had mutual differences against each other. But this carnage was seen as a possible alliance between the two to take on the Bhumihar Brahmins. The incident which took place at Afsar village made Ranvir Sena, a militant organisation of Bhumihar Brahmins to perpetrate the "Mianpur carnage", in which 35 people most of them belonging to Yadav community and some of the Dalits were killed.

The Mianpur massacre was a signal by the outlawed organisation to send message to Lalu-Rabri government. The Sena also shouted slogans like "Lalu-Rabri murdabad (Down with the Lalu-Rabri government)" after the "Mianpur killing" to show their discontent against the Rashtriya Janata Dal government, as according to them the government was itself behind promoting enmity between the various castes. The Sena's action was a consequence of growing anxiety among Bhumihar Brahmins who were victims of both Afsar and Senari massacre. Senari was a village just 10 km away from the Mianpur in which 34 people of Bhumihar community were killed a year before the Afsar incident by Maoist Communist Centre.

Investigation also found it contrasting that although the "Afsar killing" was engineered by the Kurmis, Bhumihar Brahmins killed mostly Yadavs in Mianpur. According to media reports, few days after Afsar massacre the chief of Ranvir Sena, Brahmeshwar Singh visited the house of Akhilesh Singh, whose family members and relatives were gunned down by the Kurmi gangster Ashok Mahto. The chief told Singh not to antagonise Kurmis as their real enemies were Yadavs.The fact that core base of Samata Party were Kurmi and Bhumihar Brahmins and in case of differences between them, Yadavs can get an upper hand. This prevented Sena to retaliate against the Kurmis.

== Aftermath ==
According to an Indian Express report, Rashtriya Janata Dal government was selective in visiting the place of massacre. The leaders frequently visited the places were Dalits were killed but gave less importance to the places were "upper caste" were the victim. During "Afsar massacre", Lalu Prasad condemned the incident but avoided visiting the site as during his earlier visits at "Senari" and other places were "upper castes" were killed, he was hooted by the kinsmen of the victims. Meanwhile, the "Mianpur" was the last big massacre perpetrated by Ranvir Sena after which it went into dormancy.

The Massacre at Afsar (Nawada) was also followed by large-scale rioting by Bhumihar youths, who thrashed the windows of vehicles passing through the nearby highway and pelted them with stones.

== See also ==
- Bara massacre (India)
- Dalelchak-Bhagaura Massacre 1987
- List of caste based violence in Bihar
