= Kaler =

Kaler may refer to:

== Places ==
- Kaler, Armenia, a town in Syunik Province, Armenia
- Kaler, Kentucky, an unincorporated community in Graves County, Kentucky, United States
- Kaler, Bihar, a block in Arwal district, Bihar, India

== People with the surname ==
- Berwick Kaler (born 1947), British actor
- Eric Kaler (born 1956), American university president
- Ilya Kaler (born 1963), Russian violinist
- James Otis Kaler (1848–1912), American journalist
- Jamie Kaler (born 1964), American comedian
- James B. Kaler (born 1934), American astronomer and author
- Kanth Kaler (born 1972), Indian singer
- Levi B. Kaler (1828–1906), American politician from Pennsylvania
