= Aganoor =

Village in Bihar, India

Aganoor is a local market place of Aganoor village and north Kaler panchayat in Arwal district in Bihar, India. A hydroelectric power project station (SHP) is located here. The Indrapuri Barrage canal passes through the local market place.

This village has a population of 5000 and three old temples.

The nearest police station is located in Kaler; earlier, it was situated in Aganoor. This local market is a boundary of Arwal and Aurangabad district. Both these are the Naxal hit districts. The postal index number of Aganoor is 824143.

== See also ==
- Vittoria Aganoor
