= Rashtravadi Kisan Sangathan =

Rashtrawadi Kisan Sanghatan (Nationalist Farmers Organization), a political party founded by the landlord private army group Ranvir Sena, in Bihar, India. RKS was formed by the Sena in order to make it possible for it to contest elections.

== See also ==
- Akhil Bharatiya Rashtravadi Kisan Sangathan
