= Khatangi =

- Village
- Location in Bihar, India Khatangi (India)
- Coordinates: 25°3′33″N 84°45′33″E
- Country: India
- State: Bihar
- District: Arwal

Population
  - Total: 6,000

Languages
  - Official: Magahi, Hindi
- Time zone: UTC+5:30 (IST)
- PIN: 824235
- ISO 3166 code: IN-BR
- Nearest city: Jehanabad
- Literacy: 45.56%
- Lok Sabha constituency: Jehanabad
- Vidhan Sabha constituency: Kurtha

Khatangi is a prominent village in Bihar, India, situated in the Sonbhadra-Bansi-Surajpur block of Arwal district. It is located 96.1 km from Arwal and 114 km from the state capital, Patna. The village is quite old and has a population of about 5,000 people. The literacy rate is 45.56%, with a female literacy rate of 27.3% and a male literacy rate of 62.98%. The people are known for being friendly and hospitable. The economy is primarily agro-based, with agriculture being the main source of income.

Khatangi is a Gram Panchayat. The surrounding villages are Majhiawan to the north, Sarbahada to the south, Rapura to the east, and Chandaukhar to the west. It has two satellite sub-villages, Deva Bigaha and Mahadeo Bigaha.

== Transportation ==
Khatangi village is well-connected by road from all four directions. It is accessible from Gaya town via Mau and Tekari, from Jehanabad town via Manikpur and Kurtha, from Arwal town via Banshi and also through Kurtha and Kinjer, and from Aurangabad town via Konch and Goh. Regular buses operate between Jehanabad and Khatangi, as well as between Gaya and Khatangi. Auto-rickshaws are available for travel within and around the village. The nearest railway station is in Jehanabad, and the nearest airports are in Gaya and Patna.

== Places of interest ==
1. Garh (Ancient Remains):

A large fortification, known as a "garh," is situated to the south of Khatangi village. Several ancient remains have been found during excavations by local people. It is believed that these remains are from an ancient settlement.

2. Phulwari (Garden):

There is a large garden, known as a Phulwari, located about 500 meters west of the village, along the bank of a small river. The Phulwari also features a Surya Mandir (Sun Temple) and a small pond.

3. Surya Mandir (Temple):

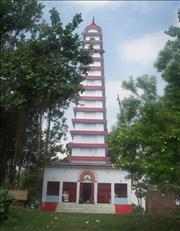
Surya Mandir, Khatangi

A very tall Surya Temple is situated in the Phulwari of Khatangi. The temple features a statue of Lord Surya. Chhath Puja is celebrated here on a large scale twice a year, attracting thousands of villagers from the surrounding areas. The temple regularly draws a significant number of visitors.

4. Bhind (Playground):

About 500 meters west of the village, there is a large field, commonly known as "Bhind." The local middle school has recently been relocated to a newly constructed building on this field.

5. Pokhara (Water Reservoir):

A large pond, known locally as a "pokhara," is located to the south of the village. It is used for irrigation purposes.

6. Nadi (River):

A small river is located to the east of the village. It is seasonal, flowing during the rainy season and drying up in the summer.

7. Aahar (Water Reservoir):

A large reservoir, known as an "aahar," is located to the north of the village. It is used for irrigation and fish farming.

8. Bus Stand:

A bus stand is located to the southeast of the village. Buses and auto-rickshaws connect the village with Gaya (via Mau and Tekari), Jehanabad (via Manikpur and Kurtha), Arwal (via Banshi and also through Kurtha and Kinjer), and Aurangabad (via Konch and Goh) for road communication.
