= Sarauti =

- Village
- Location in Bihar, India Sarauti (India)
- Country: India
- State: arwal Bihar
- District: Arwal

Languages
  - Official: Hindi
- Time zone: UTC+5:30 (IST)
- Pin Code: 804402

Sarauti is the district headquarters of the Arwal district in the Indian state of Bihar.

== Geography ==
Sarauti is located on the bank of Son River.

== History ==
Sarauti is one of the village in Arwal Block in Arwal district of Bihar. The total population of the village is 3,088. The literacy rate is 55.45%. The female literacy rate is 39.36%. The male literacy rate is 69.71%.

The number of households in Sarauti is 515. Female to male ratio of Sarauti is 92.04%. Female to male ratio of the village is less than state's female to male ratio 91.93%. The literacy rate of the village is 55.45% compared to the literacy rate of state 47%. The female literacy rate is 39.36% compared to male literacy rate of 69.71%.

The total working population is 68.2% of the total population. 68.89% of the men are working population . 67.42% of the women are working population. The main working population is 44.31% of the total population. 52.78% of the men are main working population. 34.76% of the women are main working population. While the marginal working population is 23.89% of the total population. 16.11% of the men are marginal working population. 32.66% of the women are marginal working population. The total non-working population is 31.8% of the total population. 31.11% of the men are non-working population. 32.58% of the women are non-working population.
