= 1996 Bathani Tola massacre =

Massacre of Dalits by upper caste militia led by Bhumihar caste

Bathani Tola massacre
- Part of •Caste wars of Bihar • clash between CPIML Liberation and Ranvir Sena
- Date: 11 July 1996
- Deaths: 21 killed
- Victim: Dalits
- Perpetrator: Ranvir Sena

The 1996 Bathani Tola massacre was an incident of caste-related violence in which an upper-caste militia killed 21 Dalits, including women and children, in the Bhojpur district in Indian state of Bihar on 11 July 1996. The attacks were allegedly by members of the Ranvir Sena, in response to Dalit labourers' demand for wage increase.

== Massacre ==
21 Dalits were slaughtered by Ranvir Sena militiamen in Bathani Tola, Bhojpur, Bihar on 11 July 1996. Among the dead were 1 man, 11 women, six children and three infants, who were deliberately singled out by the attackers. 60 members of the Ranvir Sena reportedly descended on the village and set 12 houses on fire. Using lathis, swords and firearms, the attackers continued the onslaught for two and a half hours. The attack was reportedly in retaliation for the earlier killing of nine Bhumihars in Nandhi village, by the Communist Party of India (Marxist–Leninist) Liberation. The conflict began when CPIML Liberation began organizing the agricultural laborers to demand the statutory daily minimum wage of Rs. 30.75. Landowners were willing to pay only Rs. 20. CPIML Liberation members convinced the laborers to refuse employment at that wage and called for an economic blockade against landowners. The attack on Bathani Tola, was an effort to weaken the resolve of Communist Party of India (Marxist–Leninist) Liberation cadres organizing in the village and to prevent a labor boycott on hundreds of acres of land. None of the Ranvir Sena leaders were ever arrested for the Bathani Tola massacre.

Following the massacre, there were further attacks on Dalits and Labourers organized by the Ranvir Sena in Laxmanpur Bathe (1 December 1997) and Sankarbigha (January 1999) in which 81 Dalits were killed.

The Landlords wanted to reassert their feudal tyranny over the poor who have started becoming more vocal and by attacking the most vulnerable, women and children, they wanted to send a clear message that they would not allow anyone to disturb the social structure.

A Ranvir Sena sympathiser, who spoke to the Hindu correspondent Shoumojit Banerjee, justified the mobilisation of the upper castes against those Naxals. "The land is ours. The crops belong to us. They (the labourers) did not want to work, and moreover, hampered our efforts by burning our machines and imposing economic blockades. So, they had it coming."

== Trial ==
- 12 July 1996 - First information report lodged against 33 persons the day after the massacre
- 24 March 2000 - Charges framed against 64 accused
- 5 May 2010 - The civil court at Ara sentences three persons to death and 20 others to life imprisonment. The court acquitted 30 others for want of evidence.
  - Ajay Singh - charged with killing 10-year-old Phool Kumari - death sentenced
  - Manoj Singh - charged with murder of 3-month-old daughter of Naimuddin - death sentenced
  - Nagendar alias Narendra Singh - charged with murder of Sanjharu and Ramratiya Devi - death sentenced
- 17 April 2012 - The Patna High Court acquits 23 men convicted of the murders. A Division Bench of judges Navneeti Prasad Singh and Ashwani Kumar Singh cite "defective evidence" to acquit all of them.
- 18 April 2012 - Bihar State SC/ST Welfare Minister Jitan Ram Manjhi told PTI in Patna that NDA led Govt (under Nitish Kumar). has decided to move to Supreme court challenging the Patna HC Order.
- 16 July 2012- The Supreme Court admitted appeals filed by the Bihar Government and some of the family members of the victims against acquittal of 23 persons, allegedly responsible for the massacre.

== See also ==
- Dalelchak-Bhagaura Massacre 1987
- Bara massacre (India)
- Laxmanpur Bathe massacre
