= Sarika Paswan =

Indian politician

Sarika Paswan is the state spokesperson of the Rashtriya Janata Dal political party in India. She is Bahujan leader and comes from the Paswan community. She has been vocal about the rights of women and Dalits in the political landscape of Bihar. She is also the RJD's appointed election incharge of the Kaimur district. She plays an active role in Bihar politics. She is also known for her controversy with the bhumihar Brahman leader Ashutosh Kumar. She has filed a case against him. Ashutosh Kumar allegedly said that she had made an adverse remark against Brahmeshwar Mukhiya.
