= Rajpura Village =

Rajpura is located in Arwal, Bihar, India. It is situated 3 km (1.9 mi) from sub-district headquarters Kaler and 25 km (16 mi) away from district headquarters Arwal.

The total geographical area of village is 77 hectares (190 acres). Rajpura has a total population of 863 people. There are about 165 houses in Rajpura village.
