= Sunlight Sena =

Feudal Private Army in India

- Founders: Ranjit Singh; Vinod Singh
- Founded: 1987 or 1988
- Active regions: Bihar
- Ideology: Anti-communism

Sunlight Sena was a caste-based militia formed by Rajputs and Upper-Caste Muslims in Bihar to take on the ultra-left wing groups of Communist Party of India (Marxist–Leninist) Liberation and the Maoist Communist Centre and their Dalit supporters. Its primary aim was to protect the vast stretches of land owned by feudal elements from these two social groups. The founder leaders of the Sena were two Rajput landlords – Ranjit Singh of Raniganj and Vinod Singh of Bisrampur, but later on, they handed over the leadership to the Muslim landlords, the Pathans and Khans. According to police records, however, the Sunlight Sena was brought into existence by the Muslim landlords in Dumharia village of the Gaya district of Bihar. Shaney Ali is said to be the founder leader in these records. It is also claimed that the activities of the Sena later expanded to Palamu region of Jharkhand too. The date of its launch is said to be 1987 or 1988.

== History ==
The upper-caste Muslims have enjoyed comfortable relationships with the feudal elements of the Hindu society particularly the Rajputs and the Bhumihar landlords. Over the years, Pathans and Rajputs have enjoyed good relationship. The upper caste Muslims thus cultivated an alliance with these social groups among Hindus and targeted the Backward Castes among Muslims like Ansaris, Qureshis and Mansooris.
