= 2018 Bihar riots =

Religiously motivated violence in India

- Part of Religious violence in India, Violence against Muslims in India
- Location: Bihar, India: • Bhagalpur • Aurangabad • Siwan • Gaya • Nalanda • Kaimur • Samastipur • Munger • Nawada
- Date: 17 March 2018 - 30 March 2018
- Attack type: Communal disharmony, Anti-Muslim pogrom
- Weapons: Stone pelting, gun shots and attacks using swords
- Injuries: 65 (estimated)
- No. of participants: 300 (estimated, people arrested linked with riots)
- Motive: Series of communal incidents in the wake of Rama Navami

2018 Bihar riots refer to anti-Muslim riots during March 2018 in the Indian state of Bihar.

The riots were initially started on 17 March 2018 in Bhagalpur where a procession during the Hindu festival of Rama Navami led by Arijit Shashwat (son of Ashwini Kumar Choubey) turned violent and clashes started between Hindus and Muslims. On 25 March 2018, police had controlled the riot. But some unidentified people vandalised a Hanuman idol in a temple in Nawada and violence broke out again affecting the Siwan, Gaya, Kaimur, Samastipur, Munger, Aurangabad, Nalanda, Haiderganj and Rosera districts. The violence also effected Asansol-Raniganj area in West Bengal.

According to a report by The Statesman, "People, especially youth riding hundreds of motor bikes, take out rallies, brandish swords and other weapons and play highly objectionable songs. Violating the terms and conditions, they try to enter Muslim-majority areas which is objected to by the local Muslim populations. As a result, stone pelting starts and then shops and other properties belonging to a particular community are set on fire." The Bihar Police and intelligence departments stated that outsiders were involved in planning and executing communal riots in Bihar.

== Timeline of Riots ==
=== March 17, Bhagalpur ===
On 17 March 2018, there was an occasion of Ram Navmi after one week. The clashes started in the Bihar when Nathnagar area turned violent where an authorized procession was taken out by BJP, Bajrang Dal and RSS activist. The court issued an arrest warrant against Shashwat and eight others. Arijit Shashwat is son of Ex Union minister Ashwini Kumar Choubey.

=== March 24, Siwan ===
On 24 March 2018, when Ram Navmi procession was stopped by some people, clashes occurred between two communities at Hassanpura. According to NewsClick report, the procession was passing through an already permitted route and when they start raising provocative slogans targeting a specific community and displayed weapons publicly—for which they were stopped. Both sides started stone-pelting and three vehicles were burnt. Six person were arrested in this connection.

=== March 25, Aurangabad ===
On 25 March 2018, Aurangabad reported the communal clashes in which stone pelting incidents occurred during Ram Navmi procession. 122 people arrested linked with clashes in two days. 25 people injured and 50 shops vandalised. Ram Navmi procession was taken out by Hindu Akhadas which turned into violent mob. Authorities imposed Curfew and internet was snapped to maintain law and order situation.

=== March 27, Samastipur ===
On 27 March 2018, Clashes hit between Hindus and Muslims in the Rosera area, where a mosque was vandalised and people from the Hindus side forcibly hoisted a saffron flag on the top of the minaret of the mosque. One day before this incident, someone had thrown a slipper at a Ram Navmi procession. However, police didn't verify who threw it. Ten people including a police officer injured and three vehicles were set on fire. After the incident curfew was imposed and three people were arrested for inciting violence.

=== March 27, Munger ===
On 27 March 2018, during the immersion procession of Chaiti Durga, some people played controversial songs and chanted inflammatory slogans against the Muslim community. In reaction, the Muslim community protested and suddenly clashes erupted between Hindus and Muslims there. Stone pelting incidents were reported and also some people from both sides fired shots with weapons. In these clashes property and vehicles were set on fire.

=== March 28, Silao (Nalanda) ===
On March 28, 2018, when the Ram Navmi procession route was changed from a Muslim dominated area and Muslims objected to it as the people in the procession were with swords and knives. Over the dispute of this route, clashes erupted and heavy stone-pelting were reported. The police resorted with force and when the mobs violate law and order, the police fired tear gas shells to quell the mobs. A Policeman along with 20 others injured during clashes. Police arrested fourteen people in connection to inciting violence. According to reports, police made several arrests in which Dhiraj Kumar who was known as a Bajrang Dal convener of Silao, Nalanda was also arrested in connection with Nalanda and Nawada riots.

=== March 28, Sheikhpura ===
On 28 March 2018, when the participants of Ram Navmi procession in Sheikhpura demanded to use a route other than permitted one in the Girhinda area, the police rejected the demand and heavy clashes erupted between participants with police. Police resorted lathicharge (Note: The term lathi charge is used on the Indian media more commonly than "baton charge".) on rioters and lodged an FIR. Police started identifying troublemakers who were involved.

=== March 30, Nawada ===
On 30 March 2018, some Muslims vandalised a Hanuman idol in a temple and when local people got news about vandalism, they gathered and the private vehicles, public transport vehicles, and shops were gutted. According to News18, Internet services suspended and more police force were deployed in the area. A mob went to National Highway 31 and hurdled stone on the vehicles and numbers of vehicles were damaged. Also, a hotel near the National Highway was set on fire. When the mob started manhandling the local journalists, the police fired 10 rounds in the air to quell the mob. According to reports, police made several arrests in which Dhiraj Kumar who was known as a Bajrang Dal convener of Silao, Nalanda was also arrested in connection with Nalanda and Nawada riots.

== Reactions ==
Nitish Kumar who was elected as Chief Minister of Bihar since 2017, reacted on the Communal clashes reported in Bihar's different districts. According to NDTV report, he said there was an effort to divide people which had led to tensions across the country, a situation that had been made much worse by indiscreet statements by leaders. He also said that divisive politics will not continue for a long period of time. He also said that divisive politics would make the situation worse in the whole country.

Kumar who breaks alliance with Lalu Prasad Yadav after Yadav's son Tejashwi Yadav was named in a corruption case in 2017. He said that he had not compromised with corruption and should not compromise with communalism either. In fact, Kumar aimed this message to BJP, whom he partnered to form the government in 2017. After Kumar's message on communalism, the state's BJP leaders continued to make statements against Kumar that he did not make his job of keeping peace and harmony and the BJP's Arijit Shashwat refused to surrender. And Kumar's government finally agreed to let 36-years old Shashwat to move the court for anticipatory bail. After lot of arguments, the judge rejected the bail and Shashwat was arrested some hours later and sent to Jail.
