= Bara massacre =

Bara massacre, also spelled Barah massacre, can refer to:

- Bara massacre (India), a 1992 massacre in Bara village, Bihar, India
- Bara massacre (Sudan), a 2026 massacre in the villages near Bara, North Kordofan, Sudan
