= Bara massacre (India) =

1992 massacre of Bhumihar by Scheduled Castes backed by Yadavs

Bara Massacre
- Location: Bara village, Gaya district, Bihar
- Date: February 1992
- Deaths: 35 killed
- Victim: Bhumihar
- Perpetrators: Maoist Communist Centre unit containing Schedule Castes and OBC

The Bara massacre was a caste based incident that took place in 1992 in Bihar. At midnight on 12–13 February 1992, the Maoist Communist Centre of India (now the Communist Party of India (Maoist)) killed 35 Bhumihars at Bara Village in Gaya district of Bihar, India. The MCC's armed group brought the 35 men of Bara village to the bank of a nearby canal, tied their hands and slit their throats. As many as 36 people were accused of the crime, but 13 were charged. The police failed to arrest the others, who had defied their summons.

== Trigger ==
The massacre which targeted primarily Bhumihars, was thought to be a deleterious consequence of the social justice politics in the Bihar of 1990s unleashed by Lalu Prasad Yadav. According to an India Today report, the Yadav leaders were openly preaching vendetta against the Bhumihars after the "Barsingha massacre" in which ten Dalits were killed by "Swarna Liberation Front", a caste army of Bhumihar landlords. The Congress leaders claimed that the MCC, though composed primarily of Dalits, has linkages to Janata Dal and Yadavs. According to a report of Indian Express:-

"The Bara massacre, in which MCC (now CPI-Maoist) members killed 34 Bhumihars, was part of a string of caste clashes in the area. The 1992 massacre itself was believed to be the fallout of six previous killings in 1990-91 in which 59 Scheduled Caste men and agricultural labourers were killed."

The Bhumihars killed 58 Dalits in "Laxmanpur Bathe" in response to the attack.

== Trial and aftermath ==
After a prolonged trial, nine people were convicted by the Court of District and Sessions Judge, Gaya, Jawaharlal Chaudhary, in its judgment and order dated 8 June 2001. The court handed down death sentences to Nanhe Lal Mochi, Krishna Mochi, Bir Kuer Paswan and Dharmendra Singh, life sentences to Bihari Manjhi, Ramavtar Dussadh, Rajendra Paswan and Vakil Yadav, and imprisonment to Rabindra Singh. The Supreme Court confirmed the death sentences on 15 April 2002.

In further trials Gaya District and Sessions Judge Daroga Prasad designated the special TADA judge, pronounced Vyas Kahar, Naresh Paswan and Yugal Mochi of the Maoist Communist Centre (MCC) guilty of involvement and were to death. The court acquitted Tyagi Mahto, Vijay Yadav and Madhusudan Sharma, on the grounds that the prosecution had failed to prove the charges beyond a reasonable doubt. The death sentence of the four convicts, Krishna Mochi, Nanhe Lal Mochi, Bir Kuer Paswan and Dharmendra Singh, was later commuted by President Pranab Mukherjee on 1 January 2017, as the result of a mercy petition.

== See also ==
- Dalelchak-Bhagaura Massacre 1987
- Laxmanpur Bathe massacre
- Afsar massacre
- 2005 Jahanabad prison attack
