= Ajay Kanu =

Indian communist activist

- Known for: Naxal commander, who was allegedly responsible behind 2005 Jahanabad prison attack (Operation Jailbreak)

Ajay Kanu also known as Ajay Sao and Raviji is an Indian gangster and naxal commander, who was allegedly responsible behind 2005 Jahanabad prison attack (Operation Jailbreak). As per reports, Kanu is said to be the chief organiser of India's biggest prison break incident, intended to free the Maoist activists incarcerated therein. He was the commander of People's Red Army— a left wing militia. Kanu was arrested by Bihar Police in 2002, while he was travelling to Patna— the capital city of Bihar, from his hideout. After arrest, he was kept in Jahanabad prison, which was attacked by naxalites subsequently with the intention to free him. He has several criminal charges over him, which includes assassination of Ranvir Sena commander, Bade Sharma and several other Ranvir Sena supporters.

== Biography ==
An arts graduate from Jahanabad College in 1988, Kanu joined People's War Group in 1980s, to avenge the death of his father, who was killed in a land dispute. Within a short span of time, due to his capacity to learn the use of firearms, and understanding of the Maoist doctrines, he was promoted and made the member of Central Committee of the Maoists and an area commander. As per authorities of Jahanabad prison, Kanu is a tough guy, with ability to withstand third degree torture. Soon after his arrest in 2002, he was subjected to third degree for long hours by the authorities of Jahanabad prison, but they weren't able to get any useful information from him. As per press briefing by the police, he kept saying that he was merely a trader travelling to Patna for business purpose. As per journalist Uttam Sengupta, Kanu is both feared and respected by prison authorities, wherever he is kept. Some of the naxalites, who previously worked with Kanu had confessed that though recognised as an able commander, Kanu is known for his short tempered nature, because of which, he is feared even by his own men. According to Kanu, earlier, he was a member of right wing student organisation called Akhil Bhartiya Vidyarthi Parishad, but later he was attracted towards communism.

The police officials of the prison confirmed that after his arrest, Kanu organised the fellow inmates in prison for better living condition. As a consequence of which, the prisoners in Jahanabad prison had access to Telephones, Television and nutritious diet. A police official also stated that besides mobilising the prisoners for their rights, Kanu also took care of his men, organising money for treatment of his men's ailed relatives and paying their lawyers, for the purpose of someone's bail. They also described with admiration, the scene of Kanu taking over the charge of 'Operation Jailbreak', after he grabbed firearms during attack by Maoists on the prison. Speaking to media, about the prison attack incident of 2005, a police official, who was eyewitness of Kanu's escape told that even after being incarcerated for years, commander was quick in handling the assault rifle and he immediately shot Bade Sharma— the Ranvir Sena commander, who was also lodged in same prison, when he refused to leave the prison on the order of naxal commanders. Reportedly, Sharma was described as a class enemy of naxalites, who were involved in armed conflicts with landlords and their militia Ranvir Sena for decades, in several districts of Bihar. After arrest of Kanu in 2002, Maoist media cell actively propagated news regarding the way he was treated by the officials inside the prison, as there were concern among a section of Maoists that he will be killed by police in fake encounter.

Kanu was able to flee the prison in '2005 prison break incident'; he was subsequently arrested on his way to Kolkata from Dhanbad in Jharkhand, with two women activists in 2007. After February 2007, Kanu was shifted to Beur Jail, where he threatened to stage protest as due to unavailability of lawyer, the judicial procedure in his case was stalled. In Beur Jail, the activities of Kanu was suspicious, hence in 2021, he was again shifted from Beur to Bhagalpur prison.

== Personal life ==
Kanu's wife Sharda Devi is a politician, who contested election for the post of Mukhiya from Chauhar Panchayat of Arwal district in 2021. In 2022 (some sources say 2020), the Government of Bihar released Kanu after serving several years of imprisonment. Prior to his release, he was made the state president of Lokhit Adhikar Party (a newly found political party based in Bihar), by its functionary Roshan Lal Gupta.

== See also ==
- Brij Behari Prasad
- Jagdish Mahto
- Shri Bhagwan Singh Kushwaha
- Ravindra Singh Kushwaha
- Amarjeet Kushwaha
