= Surrender (law) =

In common law, surrender is the term describing a situation where a tenant gives up possession of property held under a tenancy as a result of which the tenancy ends.

A surrender differs from an eviction on the question of mutual agreement. Surrender implies a mutual agreement, whereas eviction implies the absence of a mutual agreement.

A surrender is either by express words by which a lessee manifests his intention of giving his possession or by the operation of law, which happens when the parties without an express surrender do some act which implies that they have both agreed to consider the surrender as made.
