= Kaler, Armenia =

Kaler
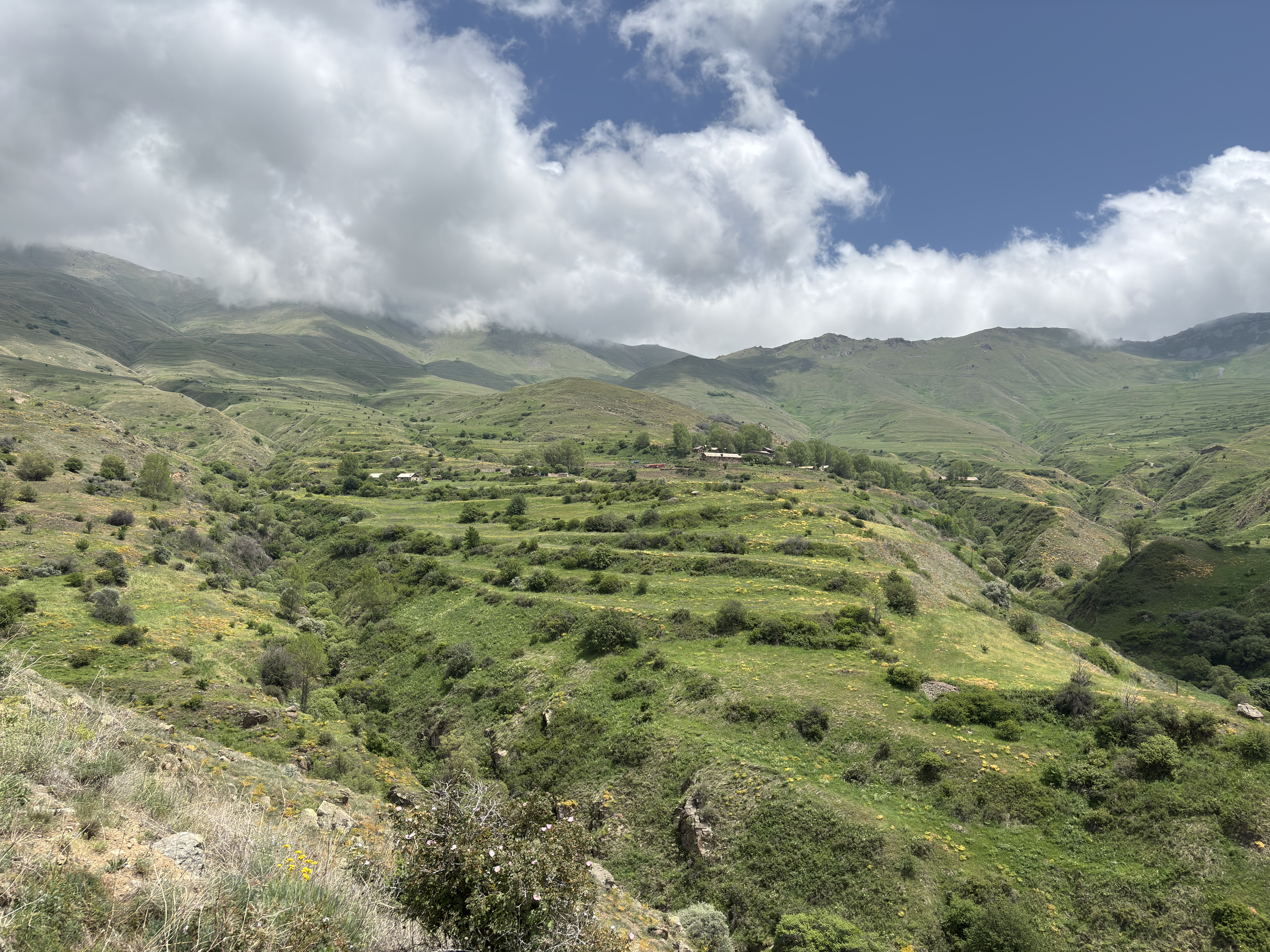
- View of the village

- Location within Armenia Location within Syunik Province
- Coordinates: 39°03′41″N 46°16′33″E
- Country: Armenia
- Marz (Province): Syunik
- Time zone: UTC+4 ( )
  - Summer (DST): UTC+5 ( )

Kaler (also, Gyalur, Kyalr, and K’yalur) is a town in the Syunik Province of Armenia.

== See also ==
- Syunik Province
