= Brahmeshwar Singh =

Leader of upper caste militia in India

- Photograph of Brahmeshwar Singh
- Born: Brahmeshwar Singh; 13 March 1947
- Died: 1 June 2012 (aged 64 or 66); Arrah, Bihar
- Cause of death: Assassination
- Resting place: Arrah, Bihar (India)
- Occupation: Farmer
- Organization: Ranvir Sena
- Criminal charges: Terrorism; Carnage
- Criminal status: Acquitted in 2012

Brahmeshwar Singh (13 March 1947 – 1 June 2012), also known as Brahmeshwar Mukhiya, was the founder of Ranvir Sena, a militia functioning as an upper-caste landlord group and comprising mainly of the Bhumihar caste in Bihar, India. On 1 June 2012, he was assassinated by multiple gunmen.

== Ranvir Sena, arrest, and acquittal ==
Brahmeshwar Singh was born in a Bhumihar family and later on became the leader of the Ranvir Sena soon after it was formed in 1994. Singh was suspected of involvement in the killings of hundreds of Naxalites who recruited people from poor and Dalit backgrounds. In 2002, Singh was arrested on "carnage" charges, for which he faced the possibility of life imprisonment. He spent nine years in jail awaiting trial and was released on bail and then later acquitted for insufficient evidence.

== Politics ==
On 5 May 2012, Singh founded the Akhil Bharatiya Rashtravadi Kisan Sangathan, an organization that Singh said would assist farmers and other manual labourers.

== Death ==
On 1 June 2012, Brahmeshwar Singh was on a morning walk near his home in Arrah, Bihar. The assassination resulted in public unrest and severe rioting. Several thousand people burnt the circuit house, Block Development Officer's office, and several government vehicles; damaged railway offices; and stopped the trains on the New Delhi–Howrah route.

The Bihar Police named eight persons as accused. Six of the accused were granted bail as the police failed to prove their involvement. Nand Gopal Pandey, the main accused in the case, was arrested in June 2016. The police also suspected Sunil Pandey, a MLA from Janata Dal (United) at the time of Singh's assassination.

The Central Bureau of Investigation (CBI) in December 2016 announced a reward of Rs. 10,00,000 for information leading to Brahmeshwar Singh's killers. In December 2023, the CBI chargesheeted eight people, including former MLC Hulas Pandey, the brother of Sunil Pandey and a Bhumihar himself, who was accused of shooting at Singh while his accomplices restrained him.

== See also ==
- Jagdish Mahto
- Ashok Mahto gang
- Ajay Kanu
