= Akhil Bharatiya Rashtravadi Kisan Sangathan =

Non-political party

Akhil Bharatiya Rashtravadi Kisan Sangathan is a non-political party started by the founder of Ranvir Sena, Brahmeshwar Singh (Mukhiyaji) on 5 May 2012. The party was started in Patna with the focus of non-violently defending the rights of farmers and other manual workers. The party was declared as an apolitical group which will not contest the elections.

The party had in past held protest meeting in support of its leader Brahmeshwar Singh and others.
