= Laxmanpur Bathe massacre =

Caste based massacre in Bihar

- Part of caste-related violence, massacre in Bihar; Clash between CPIML Liberation & Ranvir Sena
- Location: Laxmanpur Bathe, Arwal, Bihar, India
- Date: 1 December 1997; 28 years ago
- Deaths: 58
- Victim: Scheduled caste people
- Perpetrator: Militants of Ranvir Sena
- Motive: Revenge for the Bara Massacre (India), anti-communism, Caste-related violence in India

The Laxmanpur Bathe massacre was a massacre conducted in the Laxmanpur Bathe village in Arwal district of Bihar on 1 December 1997, where 58 scheduled caste people were killed by members of the Ranvir Sena in retaliation for the Bara massacre in which 37 upper castes were killed. Laxmanpur Bathe is a village in Arwal district in Bihar, on the Son river nearly 90–km from Patna.

== Killings ==
Eyewitness account of Surajmani– a 32 years old victim
Everyone was shot in the chest. I also saw that the panties were torn. One girl was Prabha. She was fifteen years old. She was supposed to go to her husband's house two to three days later. They also cut her breast and shot her in the chest. Another was Manmatiya, also fifteen. They raped her and cut off her breast. The girls were all naked, and their panties were ripped. They also shot them in the vagina. There were five girls in all. All five were raped. All were fifteen or younger. All their breasts were cut off.

— Human Rights Watch

The village was the site of a massacre of 58 Dalits allegedly killed by the upper-caste Ranvir Sena on the night of 1 December 1997. All the victims were Dalits and many among them were children, the youngest being a one-year-old, and pregnant women. To remove the last shred of evidence of their outrageous act, they crossed the river and slit the throats of the two boatmen who had rowed them, before disappearing in Bhojpur district. Laxmanpur-Bathe was targeted because Ranvir Sena members believed the village's Dalits, mostly poor and landless, were sympathizers of the Communist Party of India (Marxist–Leninist) Liberation. Ranvir Sena, a far-right wing militia of upper caste landlords, was created by Bhumihar caste to take on the Naxals.

In the well-planned operation, about 100 Ranbir Sena activists carrying firearms had descended on Lakshmanpur Bathe at around 11 pm. They forced their way into huts by breaking open the doors and fired indiscriminately at people who were asleep. The entire hamlet located on the banks of the Sone river was virtually decimated in the attack that lasted more than three hours. The youngest victim was one year old.

The incident sent shockwaves across the country. The Lalu Prasad-led RJD government was then ruling the state. The then President K R Narayanan had expressed his shock and dismay over the mass murder of 58 Dalits in Central Bihar. In his strong-worded reaction, he had termed the massacre as "national shame".

== Trial ==
In December 2008, charges were made against 46 Ranvir Sena men. Sessions Judge Mishra, on conclusion of trial in the case on 1 April, fixed 7 April 2010 as the date for announcing the verdict. Earlier, the case was transferred to Patna from Jehanabad following a Patna High Court order in October 1999.

On 7 April 2010, the Additional District and Sessions Judge Vijai Prakash Mishra of the Patna Civil Court sentenced 16 men to death and 10 to life imprisonment for the massacre. While pronouncing the verdict, sessions judge Mishra described the killings as a “stigma on civil society and rarest of rare cases of brutality.

On 9 October 2013, Patna High Court acquitted all 26 accused persons, due to "lack of evidence". The CPI (ML) staged a Bandh throughout central Bihar.

=== Reaction ===
Some commented that the High Court judgement did not get the attention it merited in the media. The acquittal of massacre-accused were overshadowed by another big news of that time - the retirement of Sachin Tendulkar from cricket. There was an angry reaction from the Bihar government and various political parties in the state. The government replied that it will appeal against the order, while CPI(M) termed the verdict as “unacceptable” and asked the Nitish Kumar government to immediately file an appeal against it. The CPI-ML criticised the state government and said that it would appeal in the apex court to appoint the SIT(special investigation team) probing all the massacre cases in Bihar. Other state parties LJP and RJD demanded CBI investigation in High Court's decision and alleged that the state government is protecting the interests of Ranvir Sena.

Maoists called for a 24-hour strike against the court's decision in Bihar's Muzaffarpur district, and the police advised that the banks and shops remain close. Seven people, including one suspected member from the Ranvir Sena, were killed in Aurangabad district on 18 October. The Dalits in the area feared that there may be a retaliation from the Ranvir Sena.

== See also ==
- Dalelchak-Bhagaura Massacre 1987
- 1996 Bathani Tola Massacre
- Caste-related violence in India
- List of massacres in India
- 2005 Jahanabad prison attack
