= Ranvir Sena =

Upper-caste landlord militia group in India

- Leader: Brahmeshwar Singh
- Dates active: 1994–2000 to present
- Headquarters: Bhojpur district, Bihar
- Ideology: Anti-communism; Anti–left-wing politics
- Status: Feudal militia
- Wars: Naxalite–Maoist insurgency

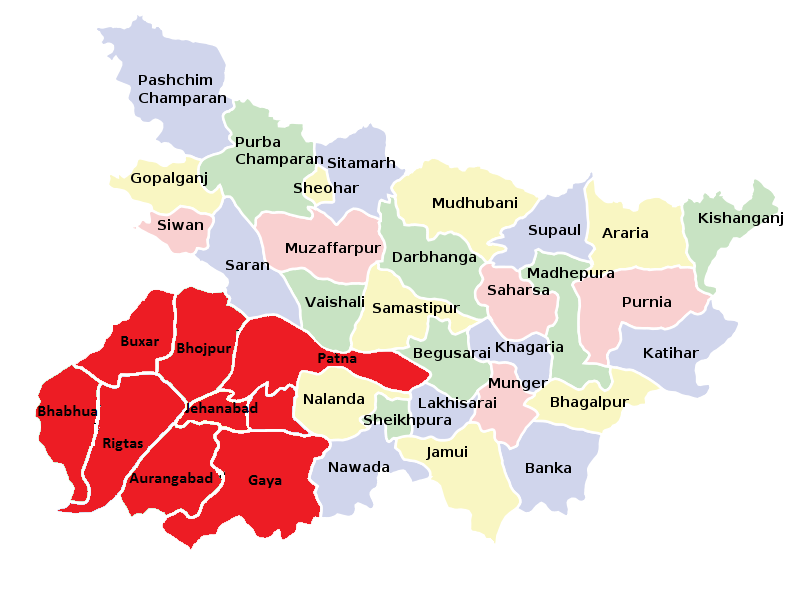
Districts affected by the Ranvir Sena

The Ranvir Sena is a militia functioning as a landlord group, mainly based in the state of Bihar, India. The group was formed by Bhumihar landlords under the leadership of Brahmeshwar Mukhiya in 1994, with the aim to counter the influence of various left-wing militants, Naxalite groups and the Communist Party of India (Marxist–Leninist) Liberation (CPI-ML) in central Bihar. The Ranvir Sena has been connected to a number of massacres including the massacre at Laxmanpur Bathe. It has, on several occasions, been accused of human rights abuses. The Bihar state government banned the Ranvir Sena in July 1995, but the group continue to remain active. The group has frequently publicly claimed responsibility for its crimes with impunity.

== History ==
According to Professor Ashwani Kumar, the "origin of the Ranvir Sena is shrouded in mystery... [but] it is fair to assume that the Bhumihars in Belaur village in Bhojpur district" in 1994. The name Ranvir comes from Ranvir Baba, an iconic local hero of the Bhumihar caste and Sena is a Hindi word meaning 'army'. As the legend goes, during the late 19th century, Ranvir Choudhary, a retired military man and a resident of Belaur village in Bhojpur district, protected the rights of the Bhumihar, a land-owning upper caste of the State, against the domination of the Rajputs. Due to the activities of Ranvir Baba, the Bhumihars asserted their power in Bhojpur district and established regional supremacy of the Bhumihars.

Rang Bahadur Singh was the first president of Ranvir Sena. He came from Ichari village, Jagdishpur, Bihar. Brahmeshwar Singh of Khopira became the group's leader a few months after it was formed.

Brahmeshwar Singh was killed by unidentified gunmen on 1 June 2012 while on his morning walk in the Bhojpur district headquarters of Arrah. He was facing life imprisonment for coordinating various massacres but was acquitted and released from jail in April 2012. A day-long curfew was clamped on Ara as tension escalated following his murder. Prohibitory orders under section 144 CrPC were also enforced in the district.

== Police and politician involvement ==
Some politicians are members of Ranvir Sena and some policemen have helped them on their raids. For example, in a Ranvir Sena raid in Ekwari, a village in Bihar, in April 1997, policemen opened the doors of Dalit villagers so the Ranvir Sena could go inside instead of protecting the villagers as they were supposed to. Chandradeo Prasad Verma, former member of Janata Dal and Member of Parliament for Arrah, put legalising the Ranvir Sena as one of his campaign points in the 1998 Lok Sabha elections.

In 2015, in a media sting operation, evidence came to light that BJP leaders, including Murli Manohar Joshi and C. P. Thakur and the former PM Chandra Shekhar were complicit in the Bihar Dalit massacres committed by the Ranvir Sena, further Lalu Prasad's RJD set up the Amir Das Commission, after the Laxmanpur Bathe massacre. The mandate of the commission was to inquire if there were any links between political parties and the Ranvir Sena. The Nitish Kumar government abruptly disbanded the commission in 2006, just before it was to submit its report. It is strongly believed that the commission's findings were going to demonstrate firm links between the Ranvir Sena, the JD(U) and the BJP .

== Mass killings ==
On 11 July 1996, 21 Dalits were slaughtered by the Ranvir Sena in Bathani Tola, Bhojpur district. Among the dead were 11 women, six children and three infants. The perpetrators targeted women and children in particular, so as to deter any future resistance. Three people were sentenced to death and 20 sentenced to life imprisonment in 2010 for participating in the massacre, but the Patna High Court acquitted all 23 in April 2012.

We kill children because they will grow up to become Naxalites. We kill women because they will give birth to Naxalites.

— Ranvir Sena member, in a 21 February 1998 interview with Human Rights Watch

Ranvir Sena killed 10 workers in Haibaspur on 23 March 1997. They wrote the name of the organisation in blood on the village well before they left. Most of the people Ranvir Sena killed that night belonged to families allegedly supporting Party Unity, a communist group.

On 1 December 1997, sena members killed 63 Dalits–16 children, 27 women and 18 men–using guns in Laxmanpur-Bathe. The dead included 5 teenage girls who had been raped and mutilated before being shot, and 8 people from the Mallah community who had ferried Ranvir Sena members across the Son River before and after the attack.

On 25 January 1999, there was a massacre of 22 Dalit men, women and children by Ranvir Sena in the village of Shankarbigha, Jehanabad due to their alleged Naxalite allegiance and to establish the supremacy of landlords. Another massacre followed two weeks later in the neighboring village of Narayanpur, where Ranvir Sena killed twelve villagers belonging to the Chamar community.

In June 2000, Ranvir Sena was alleged to be behind the attack, carried out using automatic weapons, on the Yadav villagers of Miapur, Aurangabad district in Bihar. 22 people died immediately and the rest succumbed to their injuries. The victims included six minors. 18 were injured included 10 critically. This was speculated to be a revenge attack after the killings of 11 upper-caste villagers.

Caste-based violence in southwest Bihar, 1996–2000
Year	Description	Trial
1996	Nadhi (Bhojpur): 8 killed in CPI(ML) attack on upper castes/landlords; Nadhi (Bhojpur): 9 killed in attack by upper castes on SCs; Bathanitola (Bhojpur): 22 Dalits killed by landlords, the worst of that year's many attacks	
1997	Raghopur (Patna): 6 Bhumihars killed by CPI(ML); Haibaspur (Patna): 10 SCs killed by landlords; Ekwari (Bhojpur): 10 SCs killed by upper castes; Khadasin (Jehanabad): 8 SCs killed by landlords; Lakshmanpur-Bathe (Jehahanabad): 61 Dalits killed in attack by upper castes; Chauram (Jehanabad): 9 members of upper castes killed in CPI(ML-Liberation) attack	
1998	Nagri (Bhojpur): 10 SCs killed by landlords	
1999	Shankarbigha (Jehanabad): 23 SCs killed by upper castes; Narayanpur (Jehanabad): 11 SCs killed by upper castes; Usri Bazar (Jehanabad): 7 upper caste members killed in attack by CPI(ML-Liberation); Senari (Jehanabad): 35 killed in attack on landlords, first strong sign of MCC gaining strength; Sendani (Gaya): 12 SCs killed by landlords	
2000	Afsar (Nawada): 12 upper caste members killed in attack by OBCs; Miapur (Aurangabad): At least 35 OBCs (Yadavs) alleged to be killed by Sena in a revenge attack.	

== Organisation ==
Brahmeshwar Singh 'Mukhiya', the founder chief of the Ranvir Sena, on whose head the authorities had placed a reward of half a million Indian rupees, was the Supreme Commander of the Ranvir Sena until he was arrested in Patna on 29 August 2002 to face a number of criminal cases, which included those related to massacres.

Initial reports said that Shamsher Bahadur Singh was, on 7 September 2002, appointed a new chief of the Ranvir Sena. However, according to a report of 25 December 2002, the chief of the Ranvir Sena was Bhuar Thakur until he was arrested with his two associates on 24 December 2002 near Karnol bridge on the Patna-Sasaram road in Charpokhri, Bhojpur.

Rashtravadi Kisan Sangathan is the political wing formed to take part in the 2004 elections. The Ranvir Mahila Sangh, a women's wing, has also been created. Its members too have been trained in arms use.

On 8 July 2011, Brahmeshwar Singh was released on bail after serving 9 years in jail awaiting trial for 17 cases, including those related to Dalit carnages in Bihar. He had earlier been granted bail in 16 other cases. On 5 May 2012, Singh floated a non-electoral outfit named Akhil Bharatiya Rashtravadi Kisan Sangathan. However, he was shot dead less than a month later, on 1 June 2012, by unidentified gunmen in the town of Ara.

== Decline ==
After perpetrating a number of massacres of Dalits, Ranvir Sena perpetrated the Miyanpur massacre in 2000, in Aurangabad, Bihar. In this massacre, the Yadav caste were the victims; over 30 people were killed by Sena in this incident. However, it is reported that this incident set the tone for the decline of Sena. In response to this incident, the party of Lalu Prasad Yadav, which was in government, took stringent administrative policies to counter Sena; on the other hand, various naxalite groups also resolved their internal differences and started an extermination campaign against the men of Sena in small operations. The Miyanpur incident was the last massacre perpetrated by Sena.

In 2001, one of the area commanders of Ranvir Sena, Chunnu Sharma, who was accused of numerous criminal charges, was killed by police in an encounter in the Mahadevbigha village, Mukhdumpur police station area of Jahanabad district. While police claimed it to be an encounter, the kins of slain alleged that Mukhdumpur police held him up, along with four of his associates and they were taken to Mukhdumpur police station. After an interrogation, the associates were freed, but Sharma was killed in police custody. Thereafter, his dead body was abandoned at Mahadevbigha village by Police and the stories of encounter killing was spread by administration. The Member of Parliament, Arun Kumar and Member of Legislative Assembly Jagdish Sharma also supported this 'conspiracy theory' and demanded investigation in the alleged cold blooded killing of Sharma.

In the same year (2001), another leader of Sena's armed squad, Shashi Bhushan Sharma was brutally killed by unidentified assailants in the Bahadurpur village of Patna district, allegedly by members of People's War group. In August 2002, Brahmeswar Singh, one of the founder of Sena, surrendered to Police, after being held during a meeting of farmer's wing of Sena in Exhibition Road, Patna. It was believed that in the new political arrangement in the state, the political patronage given to Sena was withdrawn, which led to his arrest. On his arrest, Lalu Prasad Yadav, the president of Rashtriya Janata Dal claimed that, his arrest will expose the links of many politicians with Sena. Singh was shot dead after his release from jail in 2012.

In 2005, Communist Party of India (Maoist)'s guerillas conducted one of the largest jailbreak incident of India, to free their associates incarcerated in Jahanabad prison. The Maoists highjacked the whole town of Jahanabad for few hours and during that incident, they kidnapped 40 members of Sena, who were also incarcerated in the same jail. The Maoists, while freeing their commander, Ajay Kanu, immediately killed commanders of Sena, Bade Sharma and Bisweswar Rai. Of those kidnapped, dead bodies of 9 was recovered later. The other members of Sena were not traced. As per reports, a total of 8-12 members of Sena were killed in this incident. According to District Magistrate Rana Avadhesh, the dead bodies of 3 members of Ranvir Sena, who were killed by Naxalites was found on railway track near the Jahanabad prison; 5 other Sena men were killed after being taken to Belaganj in nearby Gaya district.

In 2010, a Patna court sentenced 16 members of Sena to death in connection with Laxmanpur Bathe massacre, in which a total of 58 people including 27 women and 10 children were killed; 10 other members of Sena were given life imprisonment.

In 2011, another commander of Sena, Manish Sharma, who was accused of committing numerous murders in Gaya district, was killed in the Belaganj Police Station area by unidentified gunmen. Police claimed it to be a handiwork of CPI-ML activists.

In 2017, the Rohtas district area commander of Ranvir Sena, Dhanji Singh was killed by unidentified killers along with two of his bodyguards, Mantu Singh and Shashikant Tiwary near Durgapur village in Rohtas district. It was believed that his killing was a result of growing caste based animosity in the region, which was caused by his attempt to revive the defunct Sena once again. According to Police, the murders seemed to be meticulously planned as evidences like empty cartridges were not found at the site of murder.

== See also ==
- Bhumi Sena
- Lorik Sena
- Kuer Sena
- Ashok Mahto gang
- Dalelchak-Bhagaura Massacre 1987
