= Kaler, Bihar =

Block in Arwal district, Bihar, India

Kaler is a block of Arwal district, Bihar state, India. It consist of 15 panchayats. NH139 passes through it.
