= Dalelchak-Bhagaura massacre =

Massacre of Rajputs by Yadavs in Bihar

- Part of caste related violence and massacres in Bihar
- Dalelchak-Bhagaura (Bihar)
- Location: 24.70°N 84.35°E; Aurangabad district, Bihar
- Date: 27 May 1987; 39 years ago
- Attack type: massacre, possible Gang Rapes
- Weapons: Guns, and Axes
- Deaths: 50-56 killed
- Victim: Rajput people
- Perpetrator: Maoist Communist Centre
- Convicted: 8 people

Dalelchak-Bhagaura massacre was a caste based carnage that took place in 1987 in the Aurangabad district of Bihar. The incident was described by the media as one of biggest massacres in the history of Bihar. During this masacre, nearly 50 members of the Rajput caste were killed. However the exact figure of casualties is disputed with some sources claiming death tolls to be as high as 56.

== Background ==
The Aurangabad district, which is also known as "Mini Chittorgarh" of Bihar due to presence of significant Rajput population was not different from any other part of the economically backward state. Here the feudalism of the worst kind prevailed, in which some of the affluent houses had control over vast swathes of land while others lacked even the basic necessities like proper clothes on their body as described in a report of "India Today".

The twin village of Dalelchak and Bhagaura contained several castes but most of the land in surrounding region was owned by Bodhgaya mahant and few landlords. The Yadav people of the village where in long drawn conflict with the Rajputs over the control of a large area of government land. In these conflicts several small scale killings and counter killings had occurred in the past. The notable among them was the 'massacre of Anjan village', where Maoist Communist Centre (MCC), an extremist organisation dominated by Yadavs killed a Rajput landlord. In the vendetta, the Rajputs hit back by killing 7 Yadavs in "Chhechani" village.

The action of Rajputs was a result of the notification issued by "Krantikari Kisan Committee", a communist organisation dominated by backward castes which banned the sale of hundreds of acre of land belonging to "Mahant", which was not liked by the Rajputs. A landlord Babu Lootan Singh bought the land but ended up putting a challenge to the armed cadres of MCC dominated by Yadavs.

The killings at "Parasdih" and revenge killing of 11 Rajputs at "Darmia" village also served as a propellent to this incident which took place in Dalelchak-Bhagaura. The Bihar was ruled at this time by Bindeshwari Dubey led Congress government and the tug of war between "upper castes" and backwards for political and economic dominance was on peak.

== Killing pattern ==
According to the media reports framed by the account of spectators, a band of 300–400 armed man rushed towards the village in the darkness of night. It was also witnessed that, those who were in feud with the Rajputs of the village over the land were pointing towards the houses to be attacked. Earlier, a Rajput landlord of the village who was also a member of Chandra Shekhar's Janata Party had bought 40 acres of disputed land from the "Mahant" and had displaced the sharecroppers forcibly providing a solid cause for the MCC to come in picture, because of their hatred towards Capitalism and the Feudalism.

The killing began with the men shot dead outside the houses. Some of them were killed while they were attempting to flee. The killers then entered the house and women members of the community were caught, their heads were put upon an improvised chopping block and were beheaded with local made axes. After the mass killing took place, the attackers lighted all the houses belonging to Rajputs and the corpse were thrown into the fire emerging out of the burning houses. There were houses of other castes too but none came to help the victims.

Till May 1987, Baghaura-Dalelchak was home to over 200 people: Rajputs, Yadavs, Kumhars (potters), Pasis (toddy tappers) and Ravidases (cobblers). The day the Maoists shot and hacked to death almost all the Rajputs present – from an 80-year-old woman to an 18-month-old baby – all the others fled their homes.

— The Telegraph

The intelligence network at Patna had given signals of possible vendetta on the part of Yadavs after the Chhechani, and patrol units were alerted near the vulnerable villages, but after all nothing could stop the lynching party from committing mass murders. According to Ram Deen Singh, a victim of the incident:

"The Yadavs want us to be finished, so that they can take our land cheaply." With the Koel canal coming up right alongside Baghaura, land in the village would soon have been precious beyond words.

While hiding in his haystack, Amresh Singh of Dalelchak heard the killer mob shout:

"MCC zindabad" and "Chhechani ka badla le liya" (We have taken revenge for Chhechani - where Rajputs had killed Yadavs in April) before disappearing into the night.

Later, a Times of India report covered the ground situation of the village in aftermath of the carnage as well as the failure of government to deal with the plight of victims. Though Chief Minister Bindeshwari Dubey paid a visit to the village, nothing more was done to ward off the fears from the mind of the affected families and to end the cause of disputes which had the potential to bring more cases of inter-caste conflicts in the future between the two communities. According to another victim Vinay Singh:

"Bus ek sarkari naukri mili hai anukampa ke adhar par jis se pariwar chal raha hai, Bhagwan ne jo mere sath kiya wo kisi ke sath na kare (What I have got is a government job on compassionate ground. What God has done to me, He should not do it with others)," he said.

According to the same report, Vinay was not the only person to bear this pain. When TOI reached the village, Chandra Devi (80) was present in the village. She still remembers the gory scene.

"Bhagwan ne sab chin liya, ab pata nahi ki gaon mein pahle ki tarah khusian aayengi bhi ya nahi (God has snatched what we had. Whether the village would witness prosperity again or not who knows)," she said.

== Atrocities against women ==
Writers Ashok Kumar and SK Ghosh have mentioned that the incident of Dalelchak-Baguaura massacre is often seen as the retaliation of the massacre at Chhechani, another village in Bihar. In the Chhechani village, prior to the event of Dalelchak Baguaura, an armed group of Rajput landlords had killed 7 Yadav men and raped their women with impunity. As a response to this killing and humiliation, nearly 700 armed men belonging to Yadav descended upon the village of Dalelchak-Baghaura, a Rajput hamlet. The two writers have detailed as to how men, women and children were all pulled out from their beds and their hands and feet were tied to ropes. This was followed by the gang rapes of women in front of their family members, their male relatives. The writers say that women of all ages including those above 60 years were raped by the attackers. But the other sources only describe brutal killings of men, women and children with no mention of rape.

== Consequences ==
As a result of this ghastly incident, a total of 40 Rajput families fled the village. According to Vinay Singh, a native of village who survived the carnage and owned "25 bigha" of land in the village, he never wants to return to the village but visits infrequently because of his mother who has close attachment to her ancestral village and the home. Those who lost their kins were given only government job in the name of compensation, like Singh received a job after losing 20 members of his family.

== Conviction ==
In December 1992, eight of the accused in the massacre were found guilty and sentenced to death by the Aurangabad Additional Sessions Court. However, the death sentences were never carried out. Another accused of the massacre, Ramashray Paswan, was taken into custody and thereafter released after serving eleven month imprisonment.

== See also ==
- Laxmanpur Bathe massacre
- Bara massacre (India)
- Afsar massacre
