= Arwal district =

District in Bihar, India

- District
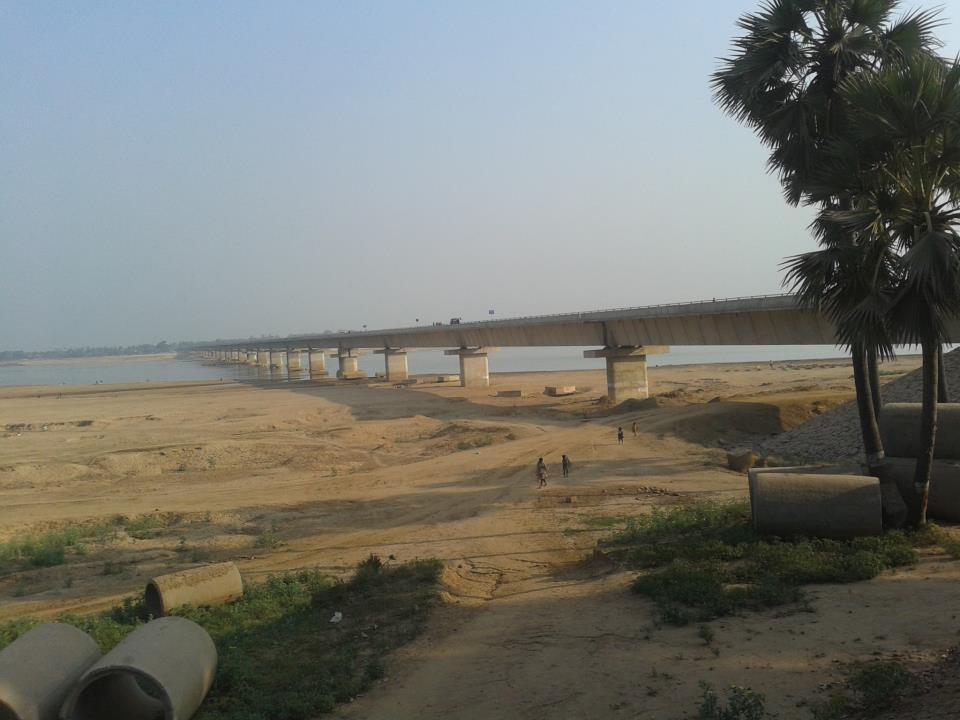
- Son River near Arwal
- Interactive map of Arwal district
- Country: India
- State: Bihar
- Division: Magadh
- Headquarters: Arwal

Government
  - Lok Sabha constituencies: Jahanabad
  - Vidhan Sabha constituencies: Arwal and Kurtha

Area
  - Total: 638 km^{2} (246 sq mi)

Population (2011)
  - Total: 700,843
  - Density: 1,100/km^{2} (2,850/sq mi)
  - Urban: 51,849

Demographics
  - Literacy: 67.44 per cent
  - Sex ratio: 928
- Time zone: UTC+05:30 (IST)
- PIN Code: 8044XX
- Major highways: NH 139
- HDI (2016): ▲0.226 (low)
- Website: arwal.nic.in

Arwal district is one of the thirty-eight districts of Bihar state, India, and Arwal town is the administrative headquarters of this district. It was earlier part of Jehanabad district.

As of 2001 it is the third least populous district of Bihar (out of 38), after Sheikhpura and Sheohar. Arwal District is very small district of Bihar. Most of people are engaged in primary sector.

== History ==
=== Recent events ===
There was a massacre of Dalit people, who were considered to be naxal supporters by Ranvir Sena-a private militia of dominant Bhumihar caste, at Laxmanpur Bathe in 1997. This massacre was in response of capturing land belonging to upper caste people and killing of Bhumihars in various massacre like Bara massacre and Senari massacre by Naxalite, most of the members of naxal cadres being Dalits. It was a part of the Red Corridor.

== Geography ==
Arwal district occupies an area of 638 square kilometres (246 sq mi), comparatively equivalent to Canada's Foley Island.

=== Hydrology ===
Arwal is the unique district of Bihar in the sense of quality of water and its greater availability. As per survey done by the experts underground water of arwal is completely free from the impurities. Water is available at most of the place at much shallower depths this is the reason why most of the households of arwal used to install handpumps instead of motors and storage. Excellent transportation, Son river and huge availability of water in Arwal may provide suitable conditions to establishment of industries. It is the part of plain of Ganga. There are most agricultural field.

== Politics ==
| District | No. | Constituency | Name | Party | Alliance | Remarks |
|---|---|---|---|---|---|---|
| Arwal | 214 | Arwal | Manoj Kumar | BJP | NDA | |
| Arwal | 215 | Kurtha | Pappu Verma | JD(U) | NDA | |

== Economy ==
Economy of the district is totally agriculture-based, and this area does not have any presence of any industry. Paddy, wheat and pulse are the main crops. Though most of the area of the district is well irrigated, due to lack of infrastructure and power, farmers are not benefitted. Industries related to agriculture are starting up nowadays.

== Divisions ==
Arwal district is a part of Magadh division. It came into existence on 20 August 2001 and was earlier part of Jehanabad district. The district comprises only one sub-division, Arwal Sadar, which is further divided into five blocks, namely, Arwal, Karpi, Kaler, Kurtha and Suryapur Vanshi. There are total 335 villages present in district.

== Transport ==
The nearest airport is in Patna and the closest railway station is in Jehanabad (JHD) and Anugarh Narayan Road (AUBR). By road, Arwal is linked with Jehanabad, Patna and Aurangabad. The Jagdeo Prasad Bridge connects to Arwal with Sahar (Bhojpur) on River Sone. It has excellent communication facility with other cities of India. NH- 139 (Old NH- 98) which passes through Arwal connects to NH- 19 (Old NH- 02).

== Demographics ==
Historical population
| Year | Pop. | ±% p.a. |
|---|---|---|
| 1901 | 153,395 | — |
| 1911 | 160,771 | +0.47% |
| 1921 | 160,170 | −0.04% |
| 1931 | 177,693 | +1.04% |
| 1941 | 206,477 | +1.51% |
| 1951 | 228,434 | +1.02% |
| 1961 | 267,736 | +1.60% |
| 1971 | 326,245 | +2.00% |
| 1981 | 384,626 | +1.66% |
| 1991 | 465,038 | +1.92% |
| 2001 | 587,826 | +2.37% |
| 2011 | 700,843 | +1.77% |

Religions in Arwal district (2011)
| Religion | Percent |
| Hinduism | 90.48% |
| Islam | 9.17% |
| Other or not stated | 0.35% |

According to the 2011 census Arwal district has a population of 700,843, roughly equal to the nation of Bhutan or the US state of North Dakota. This gives it a ranking of 502nd in India (out of a total of 640). The district has a population density of 1,099 inhabitants per square kilometre (2,850/sq mi). Its population growth rate over the decade 2001-2011 was 19.01%. Arwal has a sex ratio of 927 females for every 1000 males, and a literacy rate of 69.54%. 7.40% of the population live in urban areas. Scheduled Castes and Scheduled Tribes make up 20.16% and 0.08% of the population respectively.

=== Language ===
Languages in Arwal district (2011)
1. Magahi (86.5%)
2. Hindi (8.11%)
3. Urdu (4.96%)
4. Others (0.40%)

At the time of the 2011 Census of India, 86.53% of the population in the district spoke Magahi, 8.11% Hindi, and 4.96% Urdu as their first language. The language spoken here is Magahi. Some number of people also speaks Bhojpuri.

== See also ==
- Arwal Information Portal

== How to reach ==
Arwal district is 65 km from Patna District. It is bounded with Patna, Aurangabad, Jehanabad and Bhojpur District. This district is not connected by Rail. It can be reached by Road either from any of the bounded districts. Nearest airport is Patna airport which is 65 km from this district and nearest railway station is Jehanabad (JHD) railway station which is about 35 km.
