= Bhumihar =

Caste of India

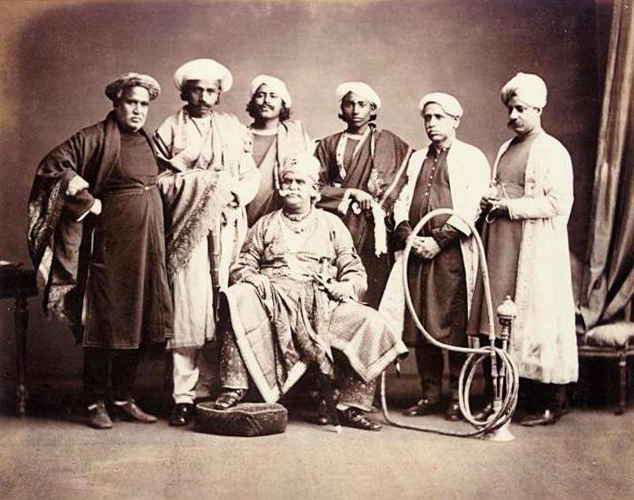
- Ruler of the Benares State in 1870s, one of the both notable Bhumihar rulers

Regions with significant populations
- East India: 3,750,886 (2.87% of population of Bihar.)

Languages
- Hindi, Bhojpuri, Magahi, Maithili, Angika, Bajjika, Bundeli

Religion
- Hinduism

Bhumihar, also locally called Bhuinhar and Babhan, is a Hindu caste mainly found in Bihar (including the Mithila region), the Purvanchal region of Uttar Pradesh, Jharkhand, the Bundelkhand region of Madhya Pradesh, and Nepal.

They have traditionally been a land-owning group of eastern India, and controlled some small princely states and zamindari estates in the region in the early 20th century. They played an important role in the peasant movements and politics of Bihar. They claim Brahmin status, although their varna has been subject to much debate.

== Etymology ==
The word bhūmihār is of relatively recent origin, first used in the records of United Provinces of Agra and Oudh in 1865. It derives from the word bhūmi ("land"), referring to the caste's landowner status. The term Bhumihar Brahmin was adopted by the community in the late 19th century to emphasise their claim of belonging to the priestly Brahmin class. The alternate name Babhan has been described as an apabhramsha for brāhmaṇ (Brahmin).

== History ==
As with many castes in India, there are numerous myths regarding the origins of the Bhumihar community. One legend states that they are the offspring of a union between Rajput men and Brahmin women, while according to another, they derive from Brahman-Buddhists who lost their high position in Hindu society. The Bhumihars themselves dislike these narratives involving "hybridity" or "fallen status", and claim to be pure Brahmins.

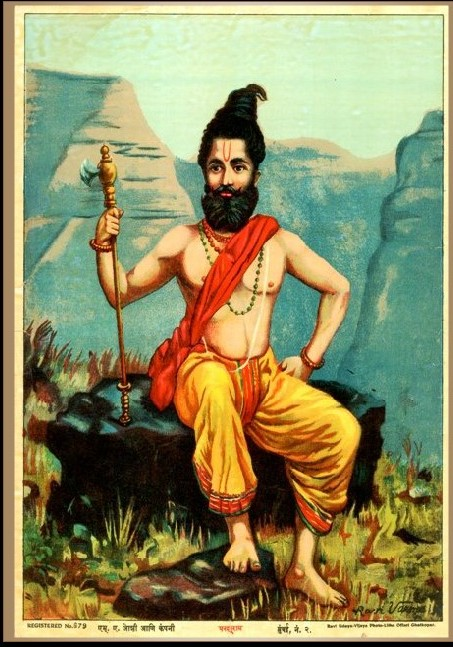
Portrait of Parashurama by Raja Ravi Varma.

Another legend states that they are the descendants of the sixth incarnation of Vishnu, Parashurama. As Parashurama was a Brahmin who carried out warfare like a Kshatriya, Bhumihars thus claim the traits of both the varnas.

By the 16th century, the Bhumihars controlled vast stretches of land in eastern India, particularly in north Bihar. By the late eighteenth century, along with Bihari Rajputs, they had established themselves as the most prominent landholders of the region. Oral legends suggest that along with Muslims and Rajputs, they displaced the Bhar and Chero natives of the region. The weakening of the Mughal suzerainty over the region gave rise to several small Bhumihar states. For example, the revenue contractors for the Mughal province of Awadh declared themselves the Maharaja of Benares. They successfully defended their independence against the Nawab of Awadh in the 1750s and 1760s, before becoming a British dependency. Other princely states and fiefdoms ruled by Bhumihars included Bettia, Tekari, Hathwa, Tamukhi, Sheohar, Mahishadal, Pakur and Maheshpur.

The distinctive Bhumihar caste identity was largely created through military service. During the early days of British expansion in India, Bhumihars under Raja of Banaras, Cheyt Singh participated in revolts against the East India Company in 1781. After his defeat, the Company started recruiting Bhumihar sepoys in large numbers until the Indian Rebellion of 1857.

In post-independence India, according to author Rumela Sen, the majority of upper caste households, including those of Bhumihars, had landholdings of sufficient size to qualify them as "middle peasants". Though there existed few large landholders amongst them, the vast majority had economic status similar to middle peasants of Koeri, Kurmi and the Yadav caste. The general categorisation of all the Bhumihars being landlords is thus not a factually correct idea, as in urban areas latter were found to be engaged in a variety of occupations. The upper crust among Bhumihars in urban areas were professionals and bureaucrats but many of them also worked as factory workers, coal miners and even load carriers (Mazdoors or the labourers).

== Varna status ==
Among various narratives regarding their origin, composition and varna status, one states that there is an element of a low caste tribe called "Bhuyans" who gained land and assimilated with the Bhumihars. Many communities do not give them the ritual status of priestly Brahmins, as most of them were cultivators during the British Raj. Some of the early censuses of British India categorised Bhumihars of Bihar as Shudras, the lowest of the four varnas. This was considered insulting, especially since several zamindars (land-owning aristocrats) were Bhumihars. Unlike the Brahmans or Rajputs, the Bhumihars did not participate in the rebellion against British rule in India in 1857, but to their dismay, they were classified as belonging to the third position after Brahmins and Rajputs in Bihar and UP in the ad-hoc census of 1865 and the regular census of 1881.

== Sanskritisation ==
Like many other castes, the Bhumihars followed the process of sanskritisation to achieve their end. The Bhumihar zamindars and princely state rulers established caste-based associations (sabhas) to form a community network and to advance their claims to Brahmin status. The Pradhan Bhumihar Brahman Sabha ("Chief Assembly of Bhumihar Brahmins") was established in Patna in 1889. Its objective was "to improve moral, social and educational reforms of the community and to represent the wants of the community to the government". The Bhumihar Brahmin Mahasabha ("great assembly") was established in 1896. The local Bhumihar Brahmin Sabhas included the ones at Muzaffarpur (1899), Patna (1899), Gaya (1900) and Saran (1908).

These associations made numerous petitions to be classified as Brahmins in the 1901 census report. Persistent pressure from the Mahasabha, who glorified the history of the community, led to official recognition of the Bhumihars as Brahmins in the later Raj censuses. According to Ashwani Kumar, the Bhumihar claim to Brahmin status means that today "unlike other upper castes, [they] guard the local caste hierarchy more zealously for they perpetually feel the pressure of being dislocated and discredited in the topsy-turvy world of caste."

Besides campaigning for the Brahmin status, the caste associations also played an important role in ensuring the general welfare of the community. In 1899, the Bhumihar Brahmin Mahasabha, with financial aid from a zamindar, established a college at Muzaffarpur. This was accredited to award degrees in the following year and it was a significant development because education in the area was improving rapidly but students desirous of furthering it had to travel to Bhagalpur, Calcutta or Patna. By 1920, 10 per cent of Bhumihars in Bihar were literate, making them one of the few literate castes; in this achievement, however, they were well behind the Kayasthas (33 per cent) and some other groups. In the first half of the 20th century, the Bhumihars suffered increasing economic hardships due to the steady fragmentation of land rights amongst heirs and the decline in agricultural prices during the Great Depression. During this period, the Bhumihar associations served as community networks that facilitated access to English education and urban employment. As with the Rajputs, Kayasthas and other high castes of Bihar – and as opposed to the methods used by most lower castes – neither the Mahasabha nor any other formal body exercised power to make and enforce caste rules.

The Bhumihar Brahmin Mahasabha held annual sessions in different parts of present-day Uttar Pradesh and Bihar. Among its prominent leaders was Sahajanand Saraswati, a leader of the Bhumihar Brahmin Sabha of Patna. During the Balia session of 1914, Sahajanand defended the Brahmin status of the Bhumihars, using quotes from Hindu scriptures to argue that priestly functions do not alone define Brahmins. In 1916, he published a book titled Bhumihar Brahmin Parichay ("Introduction to Bhumihar Brahmins"), which outlined these arguments. He classified Brahmins into two categories – begging (yachak) and non-begging (ayachak) – and stated that the Bhumihars were among the non-begging Brahmins. The Bhumihars of Uttar Pradesh attempted to popularise the term "Bhumihar Brahmin", while discarding the term "Babhan". However, the term "Babhan" remained popular in Bihar. The recognised Brahmins did not favour the Bhumihar attempts to claim an equal status, and even stopped going to Bhumihar homes to perform ceremonies.

== Political influence ==
The Bhumihars were influential in the politics of Bihar since the British days up to the early decades of post independence India. Noted Bhumihar princely state rulers included Harendra Kishore Singh (Raja of Bettiah) and Vibhuti Narayan Singh (Raja of the Benares). However, in the latter years, the OBC consolidation in the state of Bihar led the dominant OBC castes like the Koeri, Kurmi and Yadav to take lead in acquisition of political power; they replaced the upper castes, the Bhumihars, Rajputs, Brahmin and Kayastha in the political circle. By 1990s, there emerged two political blocs in the state, led by Lalu Prasad Yadav and Nitish Kumar respectively, which represented these three castes.

The Bhumihars have also played a pioneering role in organising peasant, leftist and independence movements since the 1910s. In 1914 and 1916, the Bhumihars of Pipra and Turkaulia revolted against indigo cultivation. When Mahatma Gandhi launched a satyagraha against indigo cultivation in Motihari in 1917, a number of Bhumihar intellectuals joined the protest. These included Shri Krishna Singh (or Sinha), Ram Dayalu Singh, Ramnandan Mishra, Shilbhadra Yaji, Karyanand Sharma and Sahajanand Saraswati.

While a section of Bhumihars were landowners, the vast majority belonged to tenantry. Starting in 1914, two factions emerged in the Bhumihar Mahasabha: the landowner-dominated faction led by Ganesh Dutt, and the tenant-dominated faction led by Sahajanand Saraswati. Sahajanand came from a zamindar family, which had been reduced to tenant status. He attracted a large number of followers who, as tenants, were exploited by the rich landlords. His support for the non-cooperation movement also alarmed the landlords, who were loyal to the British colonial administration. The growing differences between the two factions resulted in a split in the Mahasabha, in 1925-26. Sahajanand established an ashram at Bihta, which started attracting tenants and peasants from other castes as well. When the rich Bhumihar landlords stopped supporting Sahajanand's activities, he declared that caste associations were a means to continue their supremacy. He established a caste-agnostic peasants movement, which later evolved into All India Kisan Sabha. In Bihar, Kisan Sabha, as well as the Communist Party of India (which was heavily inspired by Kisan Sabha), were identified as Bhumihar-dominated organisations for years.

After Sahajanand gave up caste politics, Ganesh Dutt emerged as the leader of Bhumihar Mahasabha. He later entered the Bihar Legislative Council, and distributed patronage to other members of his caste. This patronage was extended further, when Shri Krishna Singh became the Premier and Chief Minister of Bihar. His tenure saw the rise of a number of influential Bhumihar leaders including Mahesh Prasad Sinha, Krishnakant Singh, L. P. Shahi, Basawan Sinha, and Kailashpati Mishra. Singh also worked for the welfare of the lower castes. He was the first chief minister in India to abolish the zamindari system. He also led Dalits' entry into Baidyanath Temple.

After Shri Krishna Singh's death in 1961, the Bhumihar political hegemony gradually declined. A small number of Bhumihar leaders continued to play a significant role in the state unit of the Indian National Congress. These included Ramashray Prasad Singh, Rajo Singh, Ramjatan Sinha, Shyam Sunder Singh Dhiraj and Maha Chandra Singh. The Congress parliamentarians Ganga Sharan Singh (Sinha) and Shyam Nandan Prasad Mishra also belonged to the Bhumihar community.

The Bhumihar influence in Bihar politics declined considerably after the electoral defeat of Congress in the 1990 Bihar Legislative Assembly election. The backward OBC castes like Yadav, led by Lalu Prasad Yadav, replaced them in political circles. In the 1999 Indian general election, only three Bhumihars were elected: C. P. Thakur (BJP), Kailashpati Mishra (BJP) and Rajo Singh (Congress). A few Bhumihar leaders also emerged in the political parties dominated by the OBCs. These included Akhilesh Prasad Singh (RJD) and Arun Kumar (Samata Dal; now Rashtriya Lok Samata Party).

As their power in electoral politics declined, a number of Bhumihars were attracted to Ranvir Sena, a private militia established in 1994. The group has carried out armed attacks against the Naxals in the region, and has been involved in committing atrocities against the lower castes, such as the Laxmanpur Bathe massacre. The Ranvir Sena which employed Bhumihar youths emerged as the most feared caste force in Bihar. It was named after the 19th century chieftain, Ranvir Chaudhary, who became a cult figure among Bhumihars after taking on powerful Rajput Zamindars.

== Socio-economic condition ==
In 2023, Government of Bihar published the data of 2022 Bihar caste-based survey. The survey revealed several findings about the community. It showed that amongst the Forward Castes of Bihar, poverty was highest in Bhumihar caste. Out of total families of Bhumihars residing in state, 27.58% were poor (the community totally numbered 8,38,447 families, out of which 2,31,211 families were poor). The criteria for determining poverty was a sum of ₹6,000 (US$62) per month as family income.

== Influence in other fields ==
Being one of the early literate groups of British India, the Bhumihar community produced several prominent literary figures. These include Ramdhari Singh Dinkar, Rahul Sankrityayan, Rambriksh Benipuri and Gopal Singh Nepali.

== Customs and traditions ==
The Bhumihars follow a subset of the Brahmin rituals, and claim to be "tri-karma" Brahmins.

Some Bhumihars in Muzaffarpur trace their lineage to Husseini Brahmins, and participate in the Muharram processions. The Bhumihars outside Purvanchal-Bihar region may follow the respective local customs and traditions. For example, in Chandipur village of Murshidabad district (West Bengal), a section of Bhumihars became the landlords after death of the British indigo plantation owners. They are now "thoroughly Bengali": they worship Kali as their primary deity, and are regarded as Brahmins by others in the village.

== Common surnames ==
In Bihar, the Bhumihars started using the surname Sharma and the title Pandit in the 20th century. Other common traditional Brahmin surnames used by the Bhumihars include Mishra, Chaudhary, Dikshit, Tivan, Pathak, Pande and Upadhyaya. It is also common for Bhumihars to affix Singh (usually identified with Kshatriyas, especially Rajputs) to their name.

== See also ==
- Kushwaha (surname)
