= Politics of Bihar =

Overview of politics in the Indian state of Bihar

The political landscape of Bihar, a state in eastern India, is dominated by regional political parties. As of 2025, the main political groups are the Bharatiya Janata Party (BJP), Janata Dal (United) (JD(U)), Rashtriya Janata Dal (RJD), Indian National Congress (INC), Left Front, Hindustani Awam Morcha (HAM), and the All India Majlis-e-Ittehadul Muslimeen (AIMIM). Additionally, there are smaller regional parties that include Samata Party, Rashtriya Jan Jan Party, Rashtriya Lok Janata Dal, Jan Adhikar Party, Vikassheel Insaan Party, Lok Janshakti Party (Ram Vilas), and Rashtriya Lok Janshakti Party. As of 2025, Bihar is currently governed by the NDA, after the alliance's victory in the 2025 election.

== Administration and governments ==
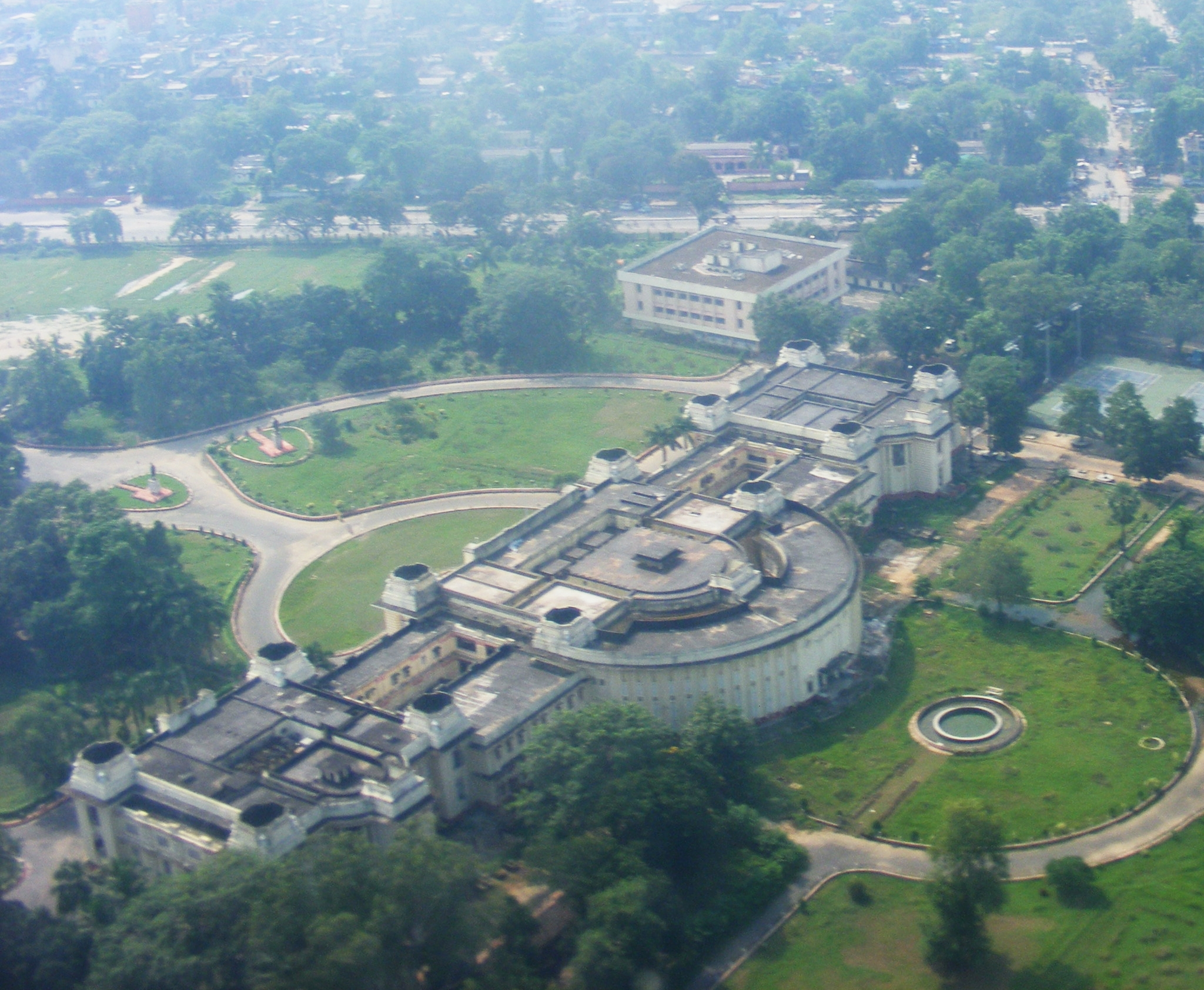
Vidhansabha Building, Patna

The constitutional head of the Government of Bihar is the Governor, appointed by the President of India. The Chief Minister and the cabinet hold executive power. The political party or the coalition of parties with a majority in the Legislative Assembly forms the government. The first Chief Minister of Bihar was Krishna Sinha, and the first Deputy Chief Minister was Anugrah Narayan Sinha.

In 2014, the incumbent Chief Minister Nitish Kumar succeeded Jitan Ram Manjhi, who was removed from office. In his previous term, Kumar resigned after the 2014 Indian general election, after which Manjhi took over.

The head of the state bureaucracy is the Chief Secretary. Under him is a hierarchy of officials drawn from the Indian Administrative Service, Indian Police Service, and other wings of the state civil services. The Chief Justice heads the judiciary. Bihar has a High Court that has been functioning since 1916. All of the government headquarters are situated in the state capital of Patna.

For administrative purposes, the state of Bihar is divided into nine divisions—Patna, Tirhut, Saran, Darbhanga, Kosi, Purnia, Bhagalpur, Munger, and Magadh Division—which, between them, are subdivided into thirty-eight districts.

== History ==
=== From 1937 to 1977 ===
Since the pre-independence period, when the first Indian National Congress government was formed in the state in 1937, the politics of Bihar have largely been driven by caste consciousness. At the time of its formation, the Bihar Provincial Congress Party had two caste factions, led respectively by the Bhumihar Sri Krishna Sinha and the Rajput Anugrah Narayan Sinha. These two factions were contesting for power within Congress in the 1937 Indian provincial elections. Anugrah Narayan Sinha's refusal to contest the election smoothed the way for the rise of Sri Krishna Sinha to the post of the state's premier.

Consequently, Sri Krishna Sinha became the first head of state, serving as the Chief Minister, until he died in 1961. Anugrah Narayan Sinha died in 1957. After the death of both these leaders, new caste factions were formed in Congress. While one of these factions was led by Binodanand Jha and Mahesh Prasad Sinha, another faction was led by Krishna Ballabh Sahay. There was a tussle between Binodanand Jha and Mahesh Prasad Sinha now for power; Jha represented Brahmins, and Sinha represented Bhumihars.

However, Binodanand Jha defeated Mahesh Prasad Sinha in the premiership race by forming a coalition of Rajput's, Brahmins, and Kayasthas, supported by Scheduled Castes and Muslims. Consequently, Jha was appointed as the new Chief Minister. However, after becoming Chief Minister, during one cabinet rearrangement, he didn't include Krishna Ballabh Sahay, who had supported him earlier. Rather, Jha gave primacy to Satyendra Narayan Sinha, son of Anugrah Narayan Sinha. This event led to the defection of Sahay towards the faction led by Mahesh Prasad Sinha.

As per one opinion, Sahay locked horns with Satyendra Narayan Sinha over his plan to give more representation to numerically preponderant Backward Castes like Ahir, Kurmi, and Koeri in government and administration. Binodanand Jha had restored the Zamindari Rights of Tatas in Jamshedpur in his tenure and when Jha resigned following the Kamraj Plan (It was a scheme formulated by Congress leader K. Kamraj that old leadership should leave their position and give way to young leaders in Congress' organisational structure). To consolidate his power, Sahay after taking over the leadership of Bihar Congress in 1963, wanted to create a coalition of the numerically strong backward castes.

He frequently argued that members of the backward castes were underrepresented in politics and advocated for greater positions and representation for them. However, Satyendra Narayan Sinha viewed this stance as a challenge to the privileges held by the Upper caste groups. Sahay had the support of Ram Lakhan Singh Yadav, an Upper Backward Caste leader in his bid. Consequently, S.N Sinha and Sahay were divided into rival political camps.

=== Post Independence: From 1950 to 1975 ===
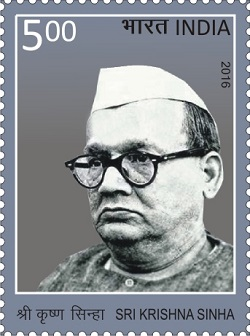
First Chief Minister of Bihar, Dr. Sri Krishna Singh

The first Bihar governments in 1946 were led by Shri Krishna Sinha and Anugrah Narayan Sinha. After the independence of India, power was shared by these Gandhian nationalists: Krishna Sinha became the first Chief Minister and Anugrah Narayan Sinha served as the first Deputy Chief Minister cum Finance Minister. The death of the central railway minister Lalit Narayan Mishra in a hand grenade attack in late 1960s brought an end to indigenous, work-oriented mass leaders. The Indian National Congress (INC) controlled the state for next two decades; at this time, prominent leader Satyendra Narayan Singh left the INC following ideological differences and joined the Janata Party.

=== Bihar movement and aftermath: 1975–1990 ===
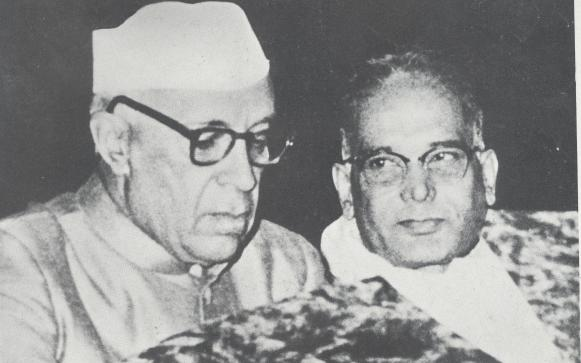
The architect of "Total Revolution" Jayprakash Narayan with Jawaharlal Nehru

After independence, when India was falling into an autocratic rule during the Indira Gandhi regime, the main thrust to the movement to hold elections came from Bihar under the leadership of Jayaprakash Narayan.

In 1974, Narayan led the student's movement in Bihar, which gradually developed into the popular Bihar Movement, during which JP called for a peaceful "Total Revolution". He and V. M. Tarkunde founded the Citizens for Democracy in 1974 and the People's Union for Civil Liberties in 1976 to uphold and defend civil liberties. On 23 January 1977, Indira Gandhi called fresh elections for the following March and released all political prisoners. The Indian Emergency imposed by Indira Gandhi officially ended on 23 March 1977.

In the election, the INC was defeated by the Janata Party, a coalition of several small parties created in 1977. The alliance was headed by Morarji Desai, who became the first non-INC Prime Minister of India. The Janata Party won all the fifty-four Lok Sabha seats in Bihar, taking power in the state assembly. Karpoori Thakur became the Chief Minister after winning a contest from the then-Janata Party President Satyendra Narayan Sinha.

The Communist Party in Bihar was founded in 1939. From the 1960s to the 1980s, the Communist movement in the state was led by veteran communist leaders Jagannath Sarkar, Sunil Mukherjee, Rahul Sankrityayan, Pandit Karyanand Sharma, Indradeep Sinha, and Chandrashekhar Singh. Under the leadership of Sarkar, the Communist party fought the "total revolution" led by Jayprakash Narayan as the movement was anti-democratic and challenged the fabric of Indian democracy.

The Bihar Movement campaign warned Indians that the elections might be their last chance to choose between "democracy and dictatorship". As a consequence of the movement, the identity of Bihar (from the word Vihar, meaning monasteries), representing a glorious past, was lost. Its voice often used to get lost in the din of regional clamor of other states, specially the linguistic states like Uttar Pradesh and Madhya Pradesh. Bihar also gained an anti-establishment image. The pro-establishment press often projected the state as undisciplined and anarchic.

Because the regional identity was slowly being sidelined, it was replaced by caste-based politics; power was initially in the hands of the Brahmins, Bhumihars and Rajputs. In the 1980s there was a change in the political scenario of Bihar: riding upon a popular movement of "social justice" and no vote without representation, the Upper OBC castes like Yadav, Kurmi, and Koeri replaced upper castes in politics.

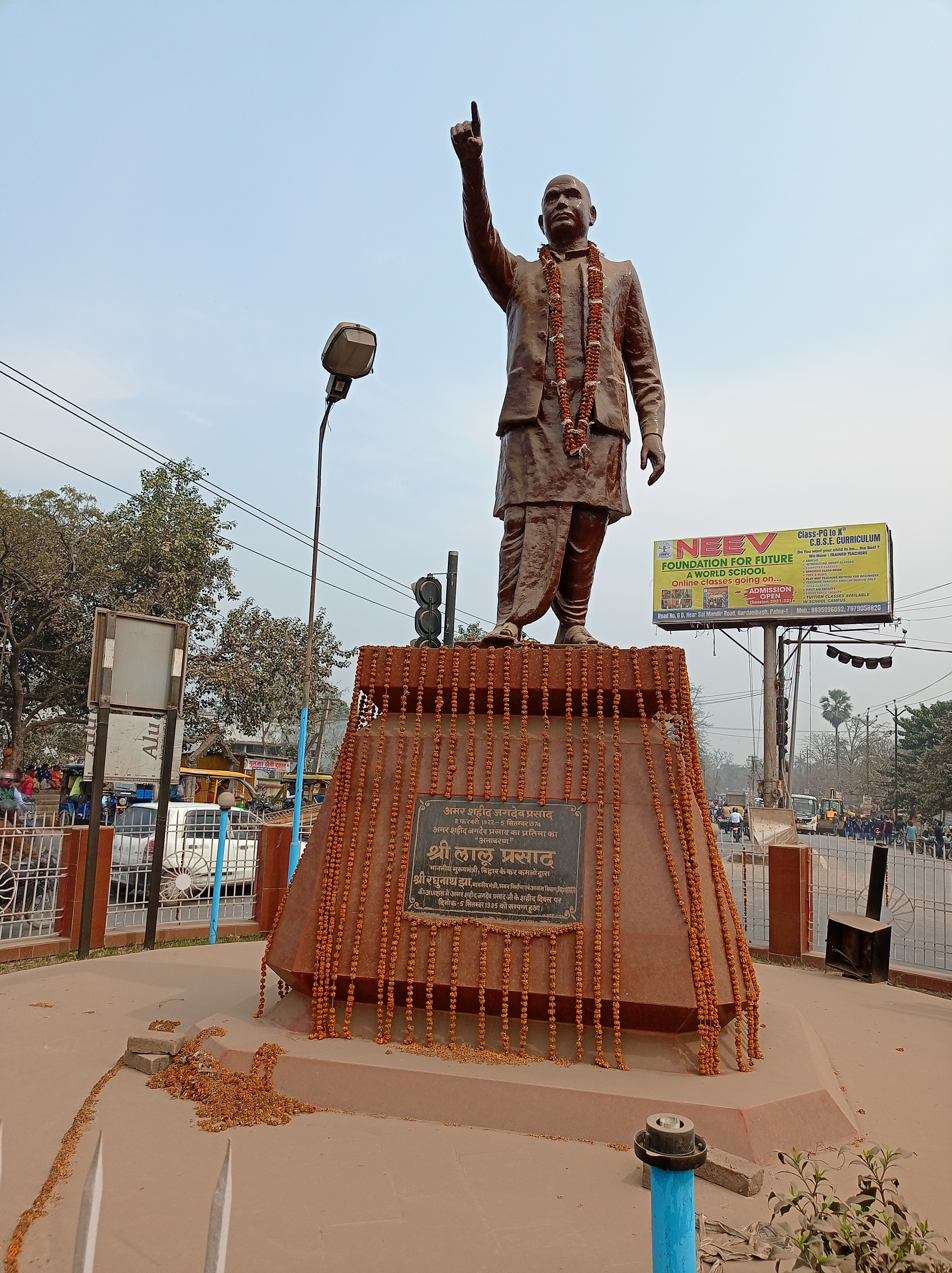
Statute of Jagdeo Prasad at the Bir Chand Patel Path, Patna. Prasad was the progenitor of Backward caste politics in 1970s.

S. N. Sinha's regime was known for deteriorating law and order, which included the 1989 Bhagalpur violence, one of the biggest riots in the state's history. A report tabled in the Bihar Legislative Assembly under the chairmanship of N. N. Singh blamed the Sinha-led INC government for the riots. The 1,000-page report outlined his and his administration's inactivity for almost two months, during which over 1,000 people—mostly poor Muslim weavers—were killed and 50,000 more were displaced.

In 1989, an anti-Congress wave defeated the entrenched INC, and Janata Dal came to power on an anti-corruption wave. In between, the socialist movement led by Mahamaya Prasad Sinha and Karpoori Thakur tried to break the status quo. The movement failed, due to the impractical idealism of its leaders and to the machinations of the INC's central leaders, who felt threatened by the large, politically aware state.

==== Law and order in Bihar: 1947-1990 ====
Records of the time indicate that in the feudal society of Bihar, the Dalit and landless agricultural labourers suffered not only from the economic hardships but also the undignified practices like Dola Pratha practiced by the upper-caste groups notably, the Rajputs. Under this social practice, the newly wed bride of a Dalit Kamia (labourer) was forced to spend her night before the marriage with the feudal lord. Other sources also indicate that the Dalit women were also sexually available to the upper-caste landlords, as they worked in their fields for low wages. It is also believed that the frequent rapes of these women from the families of agricultural labourers were the cause behind the rise of Naxalism in the Bhojpur region of Bihar, an area known for the prevalence of worst form of feudalism.

The passage of Bihar's land reform legislation, which primarily benefited a few upper-backward caste groups, was followed by efforts by upper-caste landlords to retain substantial portions of their land by exploiting loopholes in the law. These developments contributed to the rise of Naxalite movements in the state. However, the class struggle in Bihar was complex, as some members of the upper-backward castes were also landlords. The involvement of the middle peasantry, particularly the upper-backward castes, in the conflict resulted in a two-front confrontation—against Dalits, who supported the Naxalite movement, and against the upper-castes, who were determined to preserve the existing social and economic order.

Besides the ongoing class struggle which became a caste war, the police excesses were also rampant in this period and atrocities by the police force on civilians were recorded. There are incidents of the police force abusing civilians, primarily from the lower castes. There are also instances in which, due to caste affiliation and similar factors, police personnel attacked villages inhabited by lower-caste communities after the private armies of upper-caste landlords perpetrated massacres during the 1970s

Caste-based violence and police excesses in Bihar: 1947-1990
Incidents	Description	Trial
Pararia mass rape (1988)	In 1988, the police personnel landed upon a village inhabited by Yadav caste and raped women belonging to twenty families, they also abused an old man who resisted the rape of his daughter-in-law.	
Belchhi massacre (1977)	The Kurmis in the Belchhi village slaughtered approximately thirty Dalits. The causes of the conflict were the issues of wage and rebellion of a Dalit leader Singhwa.	
Munger, Chhotki Chhechani and Darmian incidents (1985–86)	On the question of land, the Rajputs and Yadavs were pitted against each other which led to attack and retaliation in separate events.	
Parasbigha and Dohia incidents (1979–80)	In the retaliation of attack by the Bhumihars on their village, Yadavs descended upon the village of Bhumihar caste and due to their inability to find the perpetrators raped the young girls.	
Dalelchak-bhagora massacre (1987)	In the tenure of Bindeshwari Dubey, the MCC unit dominated by Yadavs massacred up to fifty Rajputs in the twin village of Dalelchak-bhagora.	
See also: List of massacres in Bihar		

== Under Lalu Yadav: 1990–2004 ==
Janata Dal came to power in Bihar in 1990 after its 1989 national victory. Lalu Prasad Yadav became Chief Minister after narrowly winning the leadership contest of the legislative party against Ram Sundar Das, who was a former chief minister from the Janata Party and close to eminent Janata Party leaders Chandrashekhar and S.N. Sinha. Later, Yadav gained mass popularity with a series of populist measures. Other socialist leaning leaders, including Nitish Kumar, gradually left him and by 1995, Yadav was both chief minister of the state and president of his party, the Rashtriya Janata Dal.

=== Caste politics of Yadav ===
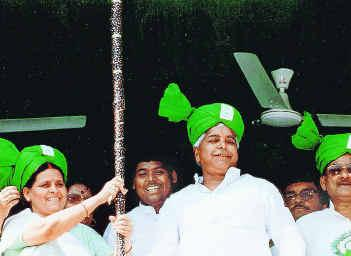
Lalu Yadav in a rally with Rabri Devi and Subhash Prasad Yadav

According to Seyed Hossein Zarhani, though Lalu Yadav became a figure of hatred among Forward Castes, he had much support from backward castes and Dalits. He was criticised for neglecting development but a study conducted during his premiership among Musahars revealed though the construction of houses for them was not concluded at the required pace, they chose Prasad because he returned them their ijjat (honour) and allowed them to vote for the first time.

During Yadav's tenure, a number of populist policies that directly impacted his backward-caste supporters, including the establishment of "Charvaha schools" for poor children; abolition of cess on toddy, and the rules protecting backward castes were enforced. Yadav mobilised backward castes through his identity politics. He viewed Forward Castes as elite in outlook and portrayed himself as the "Messiah of backwards" by living the same way as his mostly poor supporters. He continued to live in his single-room dwelling after being elected as Chief Minister, though he later moved to the official residence for administrative convenience.

Another significant development during Yadav's premiership was the recruitment of large numbers backward castes and communities to government services. The government's white paper claimed to have a large number of vacancies in health and other sectors. The rules of recruitment were changed to benefit backward castes who supported Lalu. The frequent transfer of existing officers, who were at the higher echelon of bureaucracy, was an important feature of Yadav's and Rabri Devi's administration, which led to the collapse of entire system. Yadav, however, continued to lead Bihar due to massive support from backward castes, to whom he projected "honour" to be more important than development. According to Zarhani, for the lower castes he was a charismatic leader who succeeded in becoming their voice.

Yadav mobilised his Dalit supporters by popularising the lower-caste folk heroes, who were famed for vanquishing the upper caste adversaries, for example, a popular Dalit saint who ran away with an upper caste girl and suppressed all her kin. Praising him could enrage Bhumihar caste in some parts of Bihar but Yadav participated in a grand celebration every year near Patna. His energetic participation in this show made it a rallying point for Dalits, who saw it as their victory and the harassment of upper castes.

Yadav could not restart development of the state. When corruption charges were laid against him, he resigned as chief minister and appointed his wife Rabri Devi, in his place, allowing himself to rule by proxy, and the administration quickly deteriorated.

According to Kalyani Shankar, Yadav created a feeling among the oppressed castes that they are the real rulers of state under him. The upper caste, 13.2% of the population, controlled most of the land while the backwards castes, 51% of the population, own very little land. With the advent of Yadav, the economic profile of the state changed as the backward castes diversified their occupations and also controlled more land. By stopping Lal Krishna Advani's controversial "Ram Rath Yatra", Yadav also installed a sense of confidence among Muslims, who developed a sense of insecurity after the 1989 Bhagalpur Riots. According to Shankar, during this period, upper castes were marginalised and backwards castes came to control the power firmly.

=== Rabri Devi's administration ===
When Rabri Devi succeeded Lalu Yadav as Chief Minister, Yadav, who was jailed, was still able to influence the government. This period saw the rise of strongmen from both upper and backward castes. The Yadav-Rabri administration was not supported by Forward Castes due to their political and socio-economic marginalisation under Yadav's rule. A number of influential criminals, who were portrayed as leaders of their castes, entered politics as a reaction against Yadav's "backward caste politics". People like Vijay Kumar Shukla (Munna Shukla), Anand Mohan Singh, Rama Singh and Prabhunath Singh supported the upper castes by launching retribution against lower and middle castes.

In Vaishali district, for example, Munna Shukla and his associates consistently clashed with Yadav's minister Brij Bihari Prasad, a Bania, resulting in assassination of Chhotan Shukla, Munna's brother and associate, in the retribution of which Prasad was also killed. Anand Mohan also brought havoc to the supporters of a Reservation and Mandal Commission report by forming his "Samajwadi Krantikari Sena", which was a lynching party of upper castes until it was taken over by Yadav's close confidante Pappu Yadav. Munna Shukla and Anand Mohan were convicted of the murder of Gopalganj District Magistrate, G. Krishnaiah, a Dalit.

Lalu Yadav's brothers-in-law Sadhu Yadav and Subhash Prasad Yadav, were also running parallel governments in their own areas of influence. Devi was not able to cope with the situation, nor with the flourishing private armies of the landlords, which had existed since the 1960s. In retaliation, the landless labourers and the poor middle-caste peasantry began their own organizations, such as Lal Sena and the Communist Party of India (Marxist–Leninist) Liberation.

A number of big massacres had also taken place in the decades before Yadav's and Rabri's administrations. In the Dalelchak-bhagora massacre, during Bindeshwari Dubey's government, 42 Rajputs were killed by the Maoist Communist Centre (MCC), one of Yadav caste's lynching parties. The MCC also committed the Senari carnage, in which Bhumihars were victimised. Large numbers of Dalits were also killed by the upper castes, in the Laxmanpur Bathe massacre. In the Nawada region, the Ashok Mahto gang formed by Koeri and Kurmis, was in a drawn-out battle with the "Akhilesh Singh gang" of Bhumihars. The Mahto gang killed Akhilesh Singh's father-in-law and a number of his family members, causing a severe blow to the ambitions of the Akhilesh Singh gang that was poised to take control of the rural area.

The root cause of these skirmishes was attempts to grab land in the wake of the deteriorating economy and administration: the Dalelchak-Bhagora massacre was precipitated by a conflict over hundreds of acres of disputed land between Yadavs and Rajputs; in the case of Nawada, the claimants were Koeri-Kurmi and Bhumihars. The Naxalite cadres, who were mobilising people from lower castes, were active since 1960s, when the first mass murders of upper caste landlords occurred under the leadership of Jagdish Mahto. The upper castes countered these forces with their private armies like Kuer Sena and Ranvir Sena, while landlords from backward castes did the same through Bhumi Sena and the Lorik Sena.

=== Economic decline ===
The increasing crime rate during this period created an unfriendly climate for business which led to economic collapse. The biggest crisis businesses faced was with organised kidnapping, which was linked to the ruling RJD. This economic decline led to flight of capital, unemployed youth, farmers and business leaders to other parts of India.

During the 1990s, the growth rate of Bihar was 3.19%, while for India's it was 7.25%. This difference was also observed in per capita income, as the per capita income grew by 0.12% for Bihar, as against 4.08% in India. According to a World Bank estimate, the per capita income fell from ₹1,373 to ₹1,289 between 1990 and 2000.

==== Rape as a tool to establish caste supremacy ====
The premiership of Rabri Devi reportedly saw rise in the incidents of rape, which in most of the cases was seen as the tool to establish caste supremacy upon the lower castes by the dominant caste groups, prevalent since post colonial period. Among those caste groups who were perpetrating such incidents were the Rajputs, Bhumihars and the Yadavs. In one of such incidents a girl was abducted and raped by a Rajput landlord who deserted her after repeatedly raping her for a month.

When the victim tried to file a police report, she was subjected to custodial rape for two successive nights by the station in charge, Badri Singh and Deputy Superintendent of Police, Arvind Thakur. In another incident, a group of armed Yadav men fell upon a village, exploding crude bombs and burning the huts of the Dalits. The anguished villagers fled to save their lives while a woman was dragged out, beaten and consequently raped by the perpetrators. It was believed that political connection of the criminals was the reason behind inactivity of police in many of such cases.

=== 2004: Kumar's administration ===
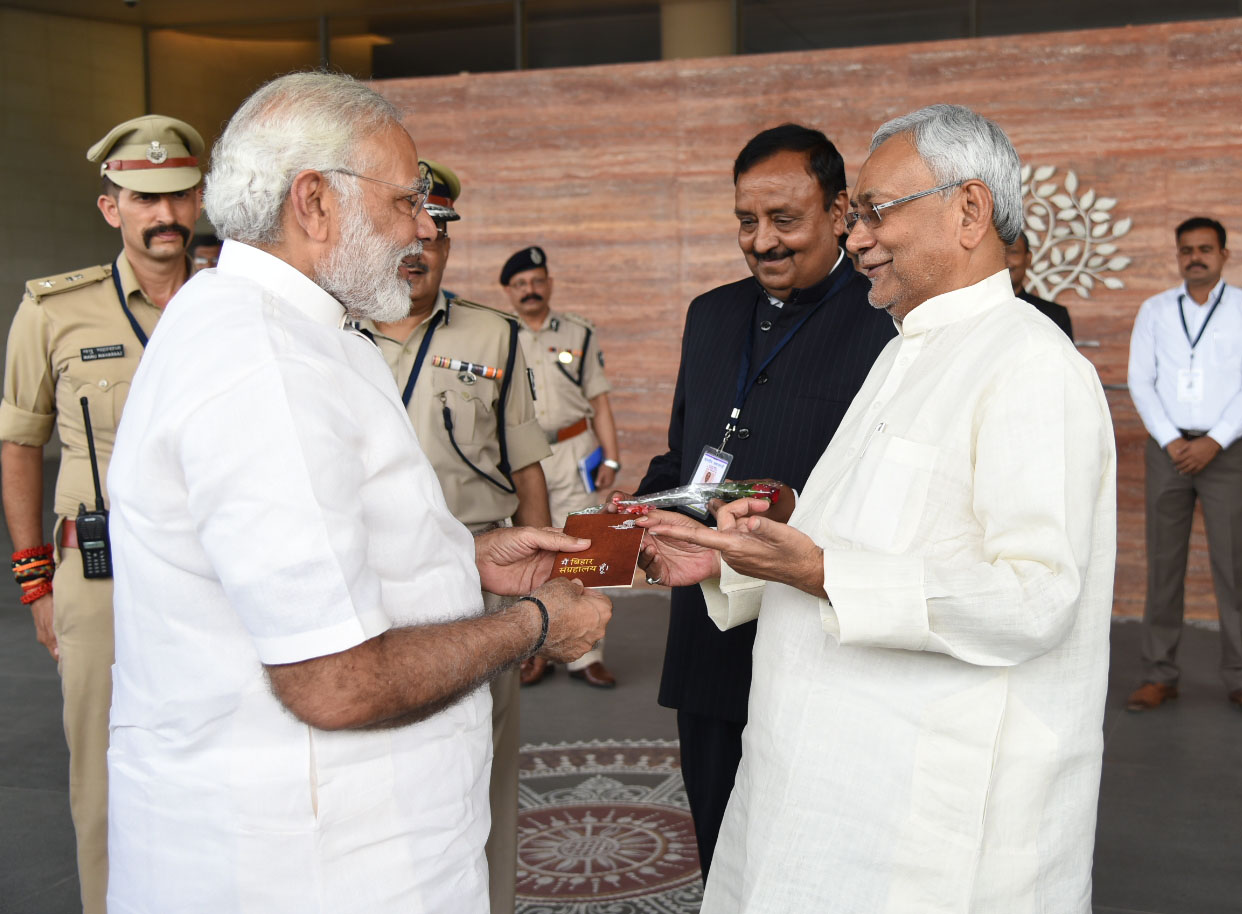
Chief Minister of Bihar Nitish Kumar with Narendra Modi in 2017

By 2004, The Economist magazine said "Bihar had become a byword for the worst of India, of widespread and inescapable poverty, of corrupt politicians indistinguishable from mafia-dons they patronise, caste-ridden social order that has retained the worst feudal cruelties". As public disaffection intensified, the RJD was voted out of power and Yadav lost an election to a coalition headed by his former ally Nitish Kumar.

== Politics of development under Kumar ==
Nitish Kumar, a once-close aide of Lalu Yadav, split with his party after the "Yadavisation" of politics and the administration. According to Arun Sinha, Yadav initially wanted to project Kumar as the leader of the Kurmi community, but Kumar had much bigger ambitions. On many occasions, Kumar refrained from associating himself with a particular community, even his own caste. During Yadav's tenure, a Kurmi chetna rally was organised in Patna. Kumar initially decided not to attend the rally but he and George Fernández eventually attended. At the rally, Kumar attacked Yadav's rule and the alleged marginalisation of other castes, who were equally ambitious as the Yadavs.

Initially, Kumar suffered defeats to Yadav and his party but was eventually able to form a social axis of "forward castes" with Koeri and Kurmi caste, who were Kumar's core supporters. After assuming power, Kumar launched a series of strikes against criminal politicians. All of the former "bahubalis" (strongman) politicians were jailed, as were the politicians-turned-criminals Prabhunath Singh, Mohammad Shahabuddin and Anand Mohan Singh. In his bid to make Bihar crime-free, many politicians from Kumar's own party were arrested. The era of "identity politics" unleashed by Yadav was replaced by "politics of development". Though caste-based rallies were still organised to mobilise voters during elections, Kumar's detachment from such rallies became a point of discussion. A rally of Kurmis in Gandhi Maidan drew statewide attention when media reported that while the crowd was enthused by the presence of Chief Minister and slogans like Garv se kaho ham Kurmi hai (say it with pride, I am a Kurmi) were chanted, he did not utter a word on caste.

Nitish Kumar had displaced Yadav's Rashtriya Janata Dal from power in 2005 by forging alliance with the right-wing Bharatiya Janata Party, with massive support base among the privileged upper-caste and urban population, specially the trader class. Later, he consolidated his vote base by including many other deprived communities in the fold of this newly formed alliance, which included some of the caste groups placed at the lowest level in the caste hierarchy like Doms and Musahars. The support among them was sought by placing them into the category of Mahadalit which entailed separate affirmative actions for their socio-economic advancement. The distribution of bicycles for school girls from poor families were other steps taken by him. Kumar sought the transfer of a portion of backward caste votes which was to be merged with BJP's vote base in order to make the alliance formidable one.

In the subsequent years, Kumar remained critical to the Yadav's politics and even accused his rule as Jungleraj (the era of misgovernance) while reminding his electorate of the same. It was reported that after assuming power in 2005, he let the law enforcement authorities loose on the petty criminals and also on those who were patronised during his predecessor's regime.

There have been instances when Kumar engaged in the battle of words against Yadav family. In 2010, Rabri Devi reportedly called Kumar a "thief" and "dishonest" to which Kumar also responded by calling Yadav family, recalcitrants who have decided never to reform.

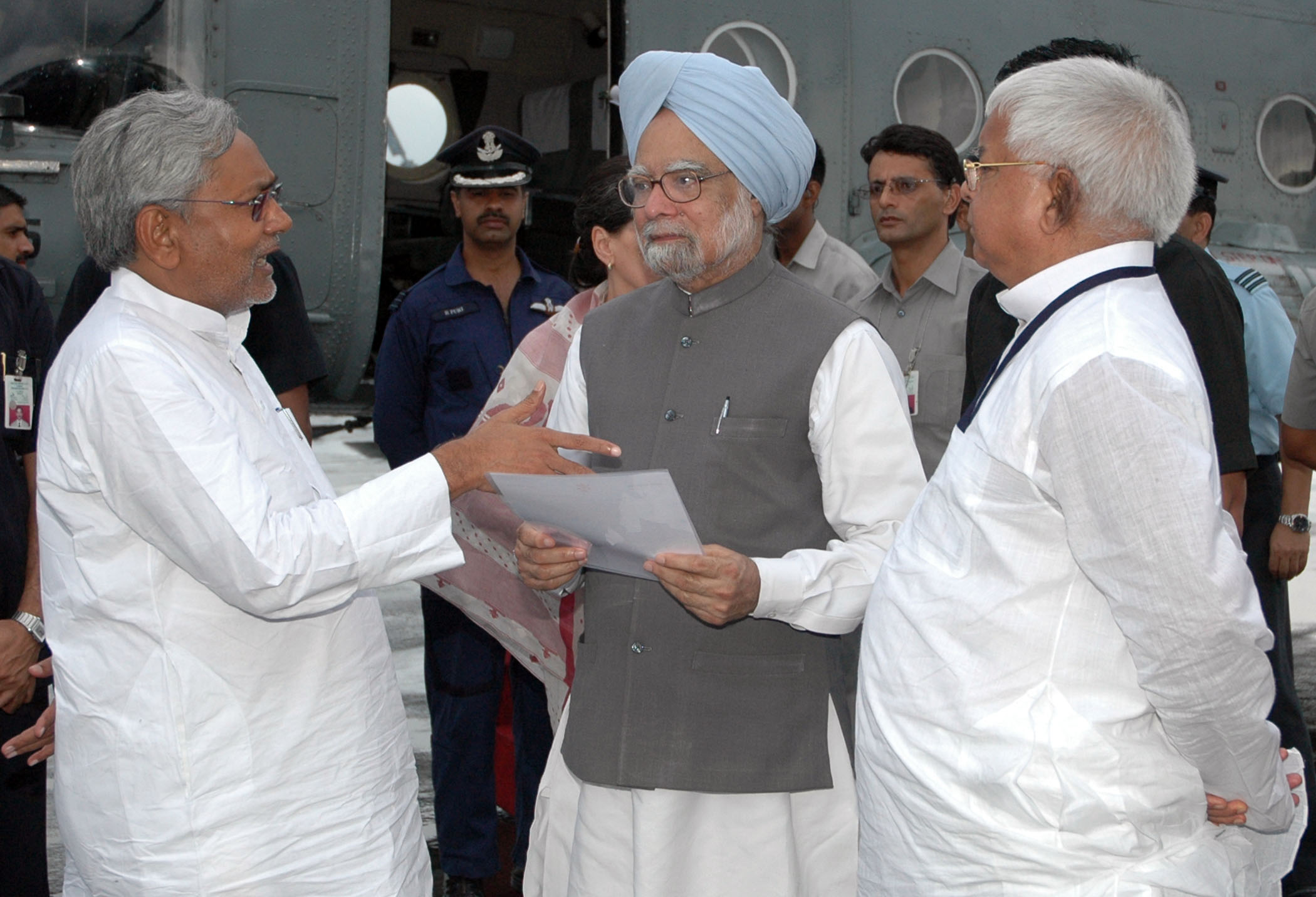
Nitish Kumar and Lalu Prasad Yadav discussing with the Prime Minister, Dr. Manmohan Singh about the relief operations on flood-affected areas, in Bihar, 28 August 2008.

In 2015, following his ideological differences with the Bharatiya Janta Party, Nitish Kumar switched the grand old alliance becoming the member of Mahagathbandhan or the grand alliance along with his chief political rival Rashtriya Janata Dal of Yadav. Earlier, Kumar had been contesting the elections upon the promises of development which was evident from the manifesto of his party but the new alliance brought the conundrum of confronting BJP's Hindutva politics. The Bharatiya Janata Party had been securing the victories on the basis of its majoritarian ideology as well as "Modi factor" amidst communally charged political atmosphere.

The BJP also secured the support of two of the influential caste groups, earlier believed to be the supporters of Yadav and Kumar by managing to win Upendra Kushwaha and Lok Janshakti Party to its side. The Hindutva politics was to confront the caste politics as put by social historian Badri Narayan, who identified the political turmoil of 2015 as a part of the challenge faced by many regional political parties and the leaders all of which enjoyed the support of specific caste groups within their states. Yadav was the key factor in this election who raised the popular slogan of "Mandal versus Kamandal", a slogan popular in 1990 when BJP responded to the politics of quota for the backward castes with its communal politics in order to subdue caste-based identity under the unique Hindu identity. Going a step further, Yadav demanded 60% reservation for the lower castes employed in the private sector and the contract jobs.

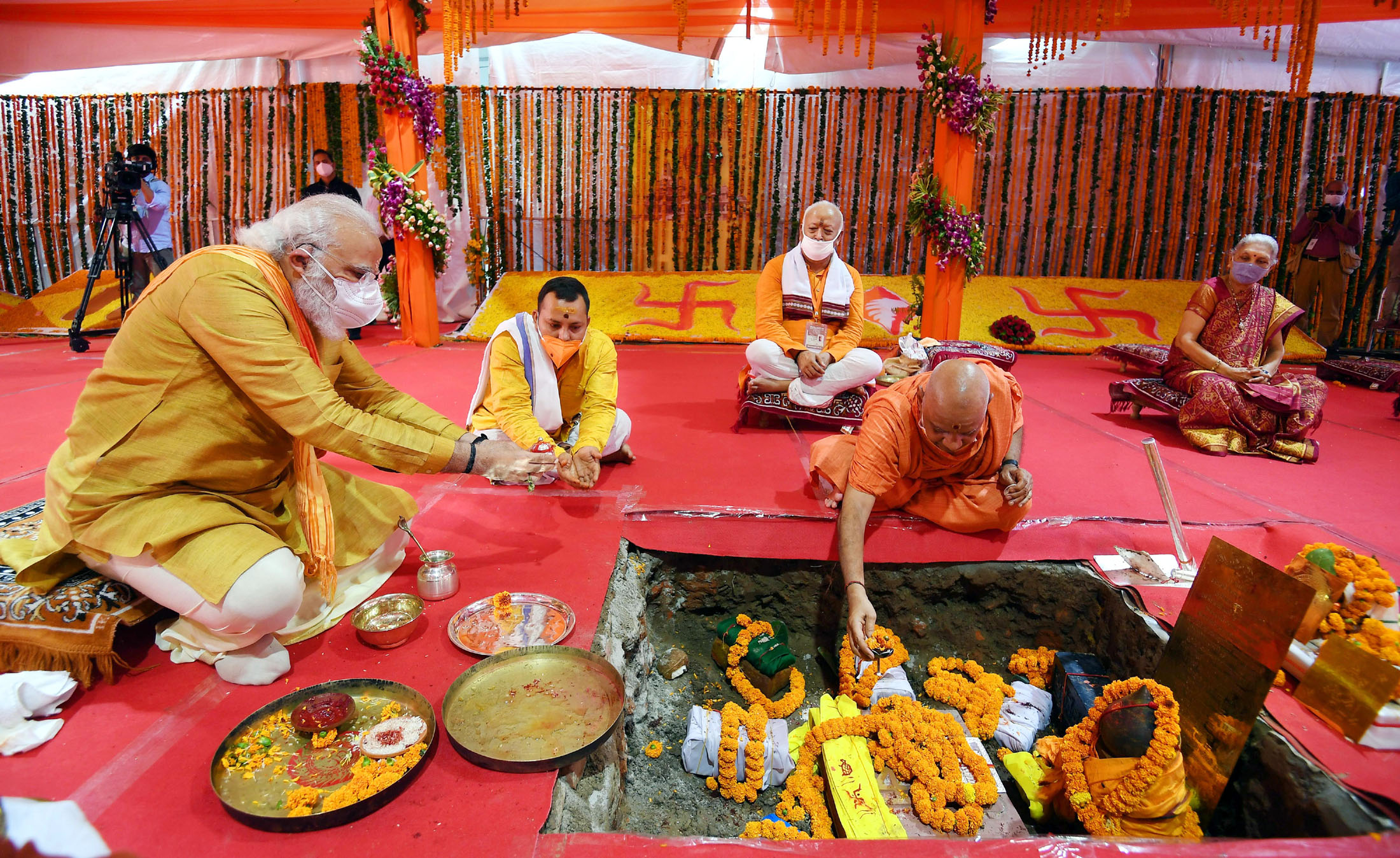
Narendra Modi performing Bhoomi Pujan at 'Shree Ram Janmabhoomi Mandir', in Ayodhya, Uttar Pradesh.

During the election campaigning set in the charged political atmosphere of 2015, the caste and religion-based mobilisation of the voters began. Yadav's remarks in which he argued that some Hindus eat beef provided an opportunity to the BJP which instigated the Hindus, including the Yadavs to vote the grand alliance out of power. Narendra Modi himself made this remark a campaign issue and attacked Yadav in his rallies.

In due course, the BJP arranged its leaders and Bollywood superstars for its election campaigning, all of them remaining critical to Kumar's rule and the criticism of the grand alliance was made in every rally by the BJP leaders and their star campaigners to which Kumar left Yadav to defend himself. The narrative of "Bade Bhai" (big brother), the word used by Kumar for Yadav was also popularised. It is believed that the BJP's rise under Modi in 2014 General Elections was a counterrevolution against the Mandal gains.

According to Jaffrelot, the rising to power of BJP led to the return of upper castes in urban politics with nearly 45% of the BJP Member of Parliament belonging to the upper-caste, a consequence of this over-representation was the disproportionate ticket distribution plan of the BJP. The return of the upper castes to politics also revived some of their orthodoxy and ethos via state vigilantism. One of the evident strategies of BJP to counter Mandal gains was the restructuring of quota rules to the benefit of upper castes which includes the lateral entry and privatisation as Jaffrelot sums up.

A Times of India report called this alliance as the attempt to revive Triveni Sangh, a pre-independence alliance of three middle peasant castes, which was called as the first attempt of the backward communities to unite under an organisational structure, in order to seek political representation. Based on the input of the political thinkers from Bihar, the report called the Yadav-Kumar alliance, the coalition of middle castes who were traditionally involved in agricultural and allied activities in pre-independence period.

Despite speculation by the media, the Lalu-Nitish alliance trumped the BJP and its coalition partners, securing a majority of seats in the Bihar Legislative Assembly. The victory came with the largest ever increase in the number of the OBC candidates primarily from the Yadav, Kurmi and the Koeri caste; who were the core voters of the alliance. It was also reported that due to these three castes voting together after a long time since Kumar defected from Yadav's Janata Dal in the 1990s, the upper-caste representation reached its lowest at 23.9% in the Bihar assembly.

In 2020 Bihar Legislative Assembly election, NDA stormed back to power with BJP winning 75 seats. Nitish Kumar remained the CM.

In 2025 Bihar Legislative Assembly election, NDA was re-elected to power with BJP emerging as the single largest party winning 89 seats. JD(U) winning 85 seats. Nitish Kumar remained the CM. On 14 April 2026, Kumar resigned as the chief minister and was replaced by his deputy Samrat Chaudhary, who became the first chief minidster from the Bharatiya Janata Party in the state.

== Splits and mergers in the JD(U) and rise of BJP ==
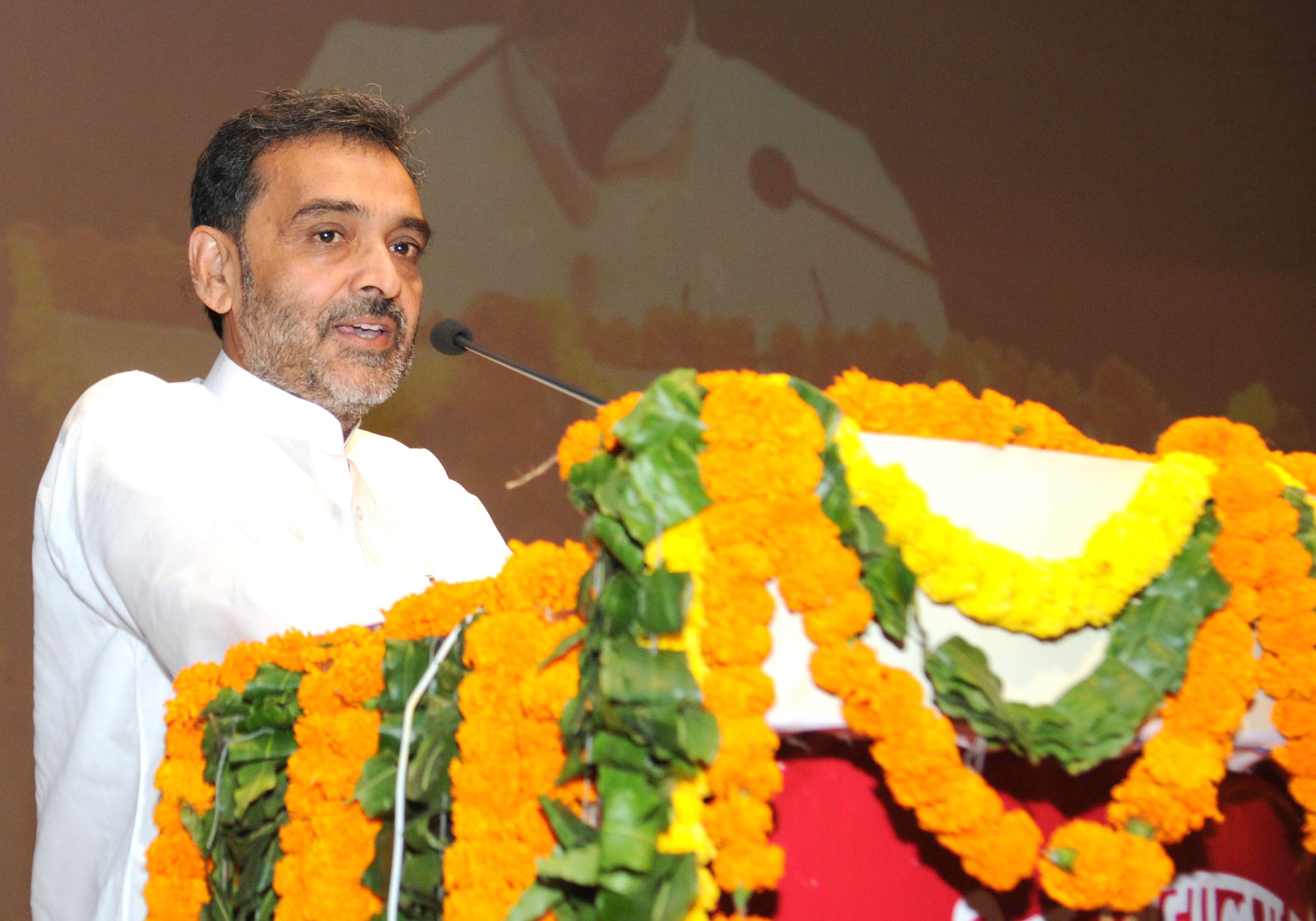
Upendra Kushwaha addressing at the launch of KV SHAALA DARPAN for Kendriya Vidyalaya, in New Delhi.

The Janata Dal (United), a successor of Samata Party, replaced the Rashtriya Janata Dal in the period after misgovernance of Rabri Devi regime. The JD(U) however failed to remain intact amidst splits and defection created in it by some of the old leaders of party who defected from it on the ground of ideological conflicts. Upendra Kushwaha, who claimed to be the tallest leader of the Kushwaha caste, thus defected to found his own political party in 2013. Kushwaha had defected from JD(U) earlier too, but had returned to its fold due to poor performance of his party and conciliatory measures taken by JD(U) leadership to bring him again into the party.

However, the defection of 2013 led to foundation of Rashtriya Lok Samata Party which gave impressive performance in 2014 elections to the Lok Sabha by winning three seats in alliance with the Bharatiya Janata Party. The performance of Rashtriya Lok Samata Party hadn't remained impressive afterwards, specially after Kushwaha brought it out of the National Democratic Alliance over the question of less seats allotted to it in 2019 Lok Sabha polls. The party then contested the 2019 election as a member of Mahagathbandhan.

The party performed badly again and the new alliance was sought with minor players like Bahujan Samaj Party and AIMIM in 2020 Bihar Legislative Assembly elections. The new coalition which was called as Grand Democratic Secular Front was successful in winning 6 seats in the elections but RLSP failed to win any seats despite having largest share of votes among its coalition partners. The RLSP however successfully deteriorated the caste equation of JD(U) in a dozen constituencies, which resulted in reduction of the number of seats of JD (U) to 43 in 2020 Bihar Assembly. The Bharatiya Janata Party now emerged as significant player in the house with 75 seats.

The conflict between the officeholders of the JD(U) and BJP also surfaced over the choice of Chief Minister, as many of the BJP leaders and workers wanted the Chief Ministerial candidate from the BJP, which was second largest party in the house and a bigger partner in the alliance in comparison to the JD(U). The top leaders of BJP however proposed Nitish Kumar as the leader of coalition and the next chief minister once again. The government formation in 2020 witnessed dominance of BJP, which got more ministerial births and appointed two Deputy Chief Ministers, both belonging to Extremely Backward Castes in order to create a new caste coalition for itself.

In the aftermath of government formation, the JD (U) took energetic steps to recover its lost vote base by engulfing the leaders from smaller parties like Bahujan Samaj Party and the organisational changes were also made by appointing Ramchandra Prasad Singh and Umesh Kushwaha as its National and state president, in a bid to strengthen the Luv-Kush alliance (defined as the coalition of Kurmi and Kushwaha caste). The most awaited step to strengthen this alliance was the merger of Rashtriya Lok Samata Party into JD(U) in 2021, after which its leader Upendra Kushwaha was appointed as the president of parliamentary board of the JD(U).

== Present condition ==
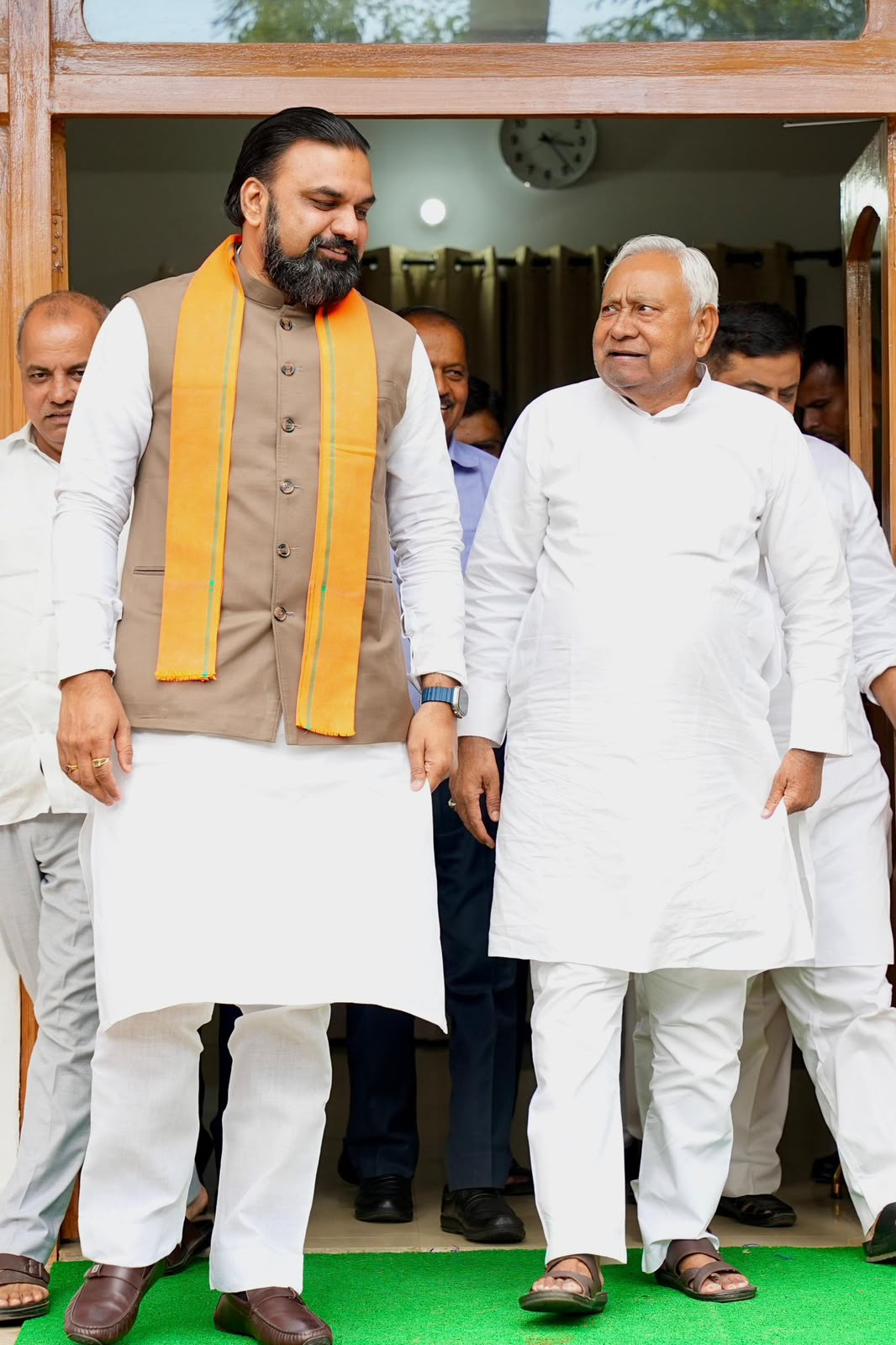
Samrat Chaudhary with Nitish Kumar in 2026.

Despite the separation from Bihar of financially richer Jharkhand, Bihar has seen more growth in recent years. In 2025 Bihar Legislative Assembly election, the NDA won a landslide victory securing 202 seats with BJP emerging as the single largest party in the state winning 89 seats. JDU won 85 seats. Nitish Kumar was sworn in as the chief minister.

However, on 14 April 2026, in a significant political shift Nitish Kumar resigned as the chief minister and was replaced by his deputy Samrat Chaudhary, who became the first chief minister of Bihar belonging to the BJP.

Chaudhary took several steps to strengthen the administration and maintain law and order in the state. He brought administrative changes like online registration of property for the elderly people for hassle free experience in the sale and purchase of land. This aimed to remove multiple law suits related to land pending in the courts of Bihar. Chaudhary also took stringent measures by giving free hand to police to act against the culprits. This, however, was criticised for promoting encounter culture in the state.He also launched scheme to elevate the infrastructure of government schools to the level of private schools and proposed to regulate the exorbitant fees charged by private schools for making education accessible to all.

In a step to give boost to industrial development and create jobs in manufacturing sector within the state, Chaudhary inaugurated a bottling and cement plant in the Buxar district worth 1700 crore rupees. For combatting unplanned urban development, he launched the ambitious project of developing twelve urban townships. This included Tirhut township in Muzaffarpur district. A number of projects were launched by him in 2026 under Chief Minister Comprehensive Urban Development Program which included allocation of ₹1047 crore for 982 projects in Muzaffarpur.

== Political Parties ==
Political party	Flag	Electoral symbol	Political position	Founded	Founder	Leader	Seats		
Political party	Flag	Electoral symbol	Political position	Founded	Founder	Leader	Lok Sabha	Rajya Sabha	Bihar Legislative Assembly
Janata Dal (United)			Socialism SecularismCentre-left politics	30 October 2003	Sharad Yadav Nitish Kumar George Fernandes	Nitish Kumar	12 / 40	4 / 16	85 / 243
Rashtriya Janata Dal			Secularism						

== Gallery ==
Notable politicians of Bihar

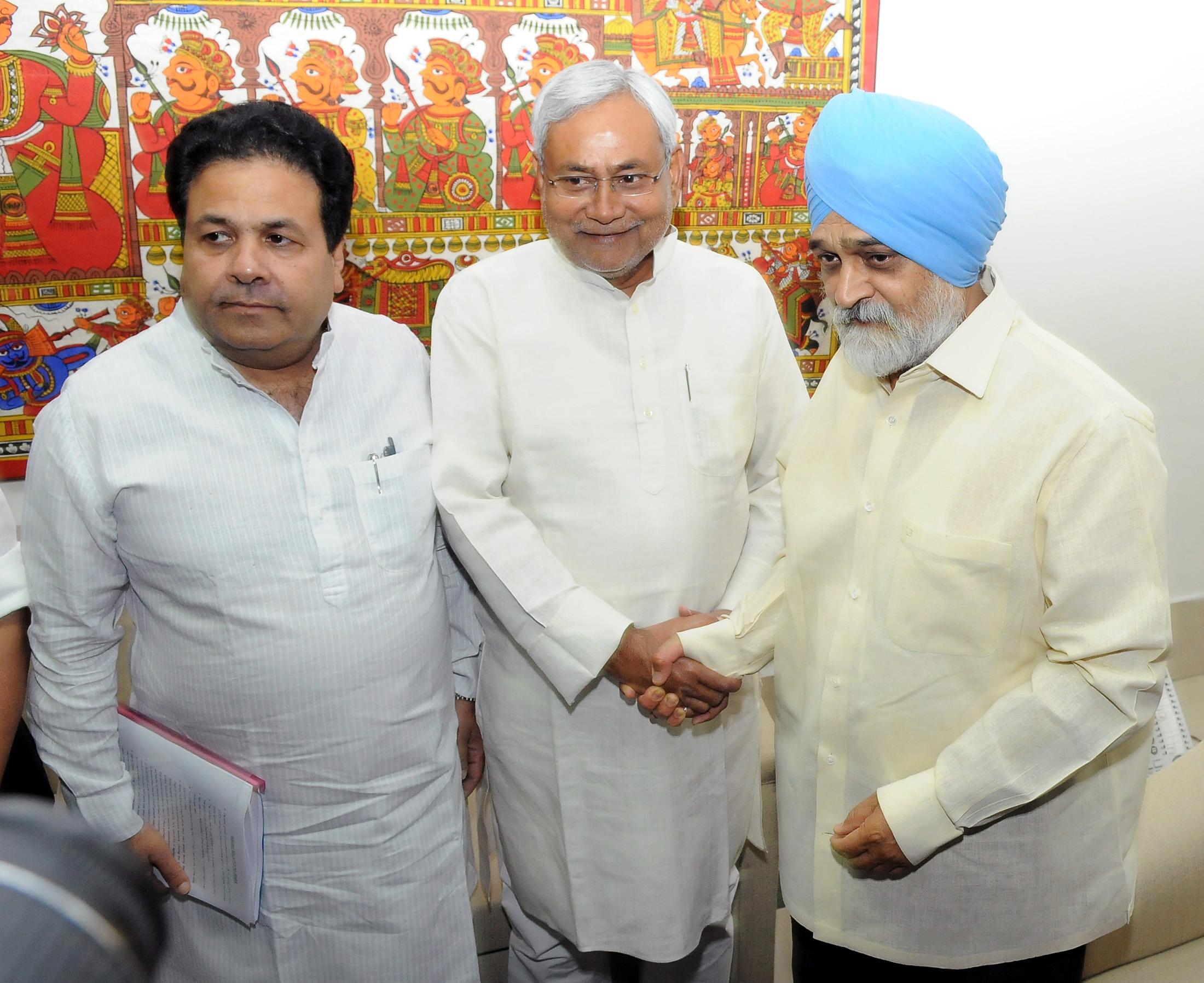
Nitish Kumar meeting the Deputy Chairman, Planning Commission, Shri Montek Singh Ahluwalia, for finalizing plan size for 2013–14 for the State, in New Delhi. The Minister of State for Parliamentary Affairs & Planning.

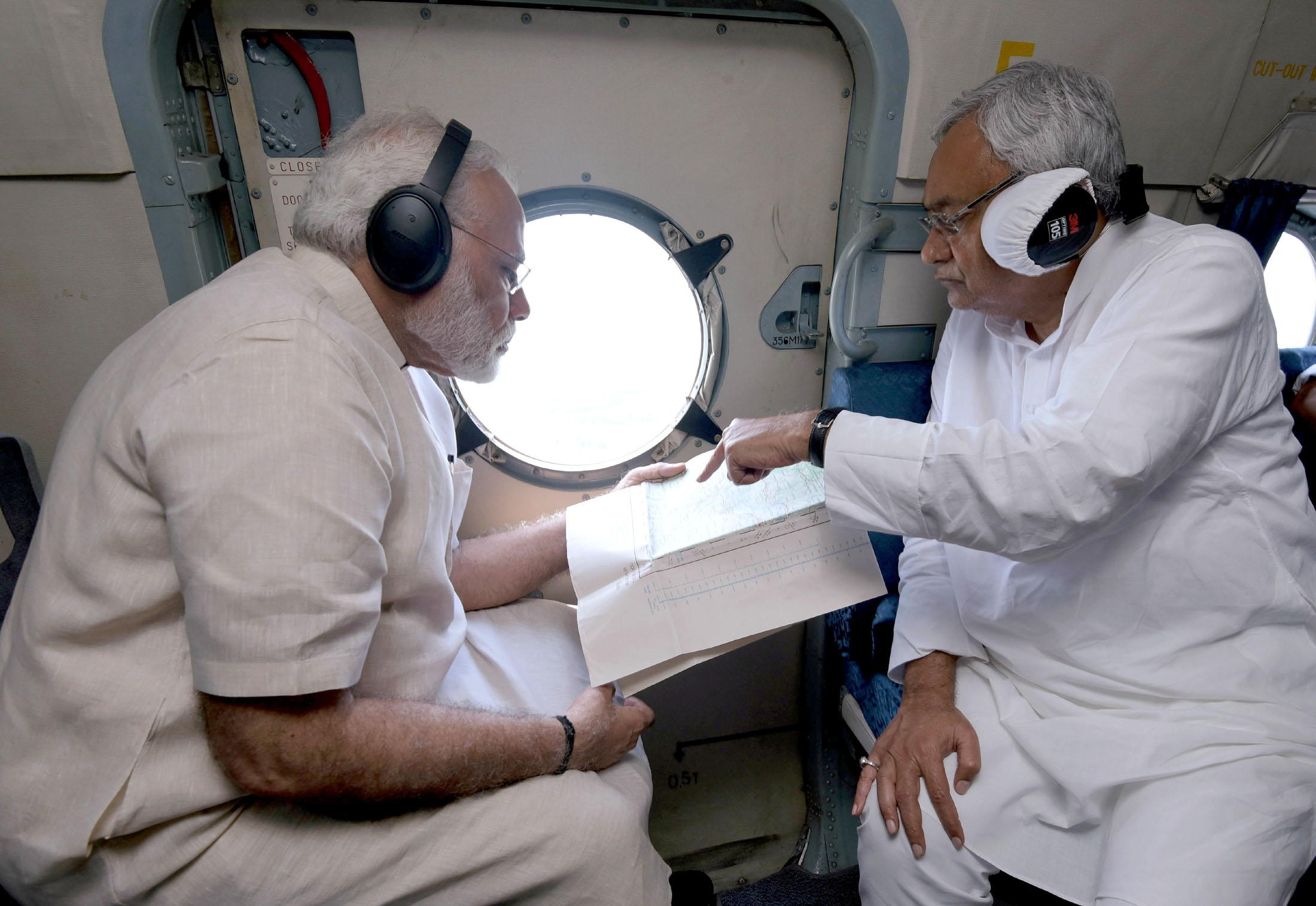
The Prime Minister, Shri Narendra Modi, and the Chief Minister of Bihar, Shri Nitish Kumar, conducting an aerial survey of flood affected areas, in Bihar on August 26, 2017.

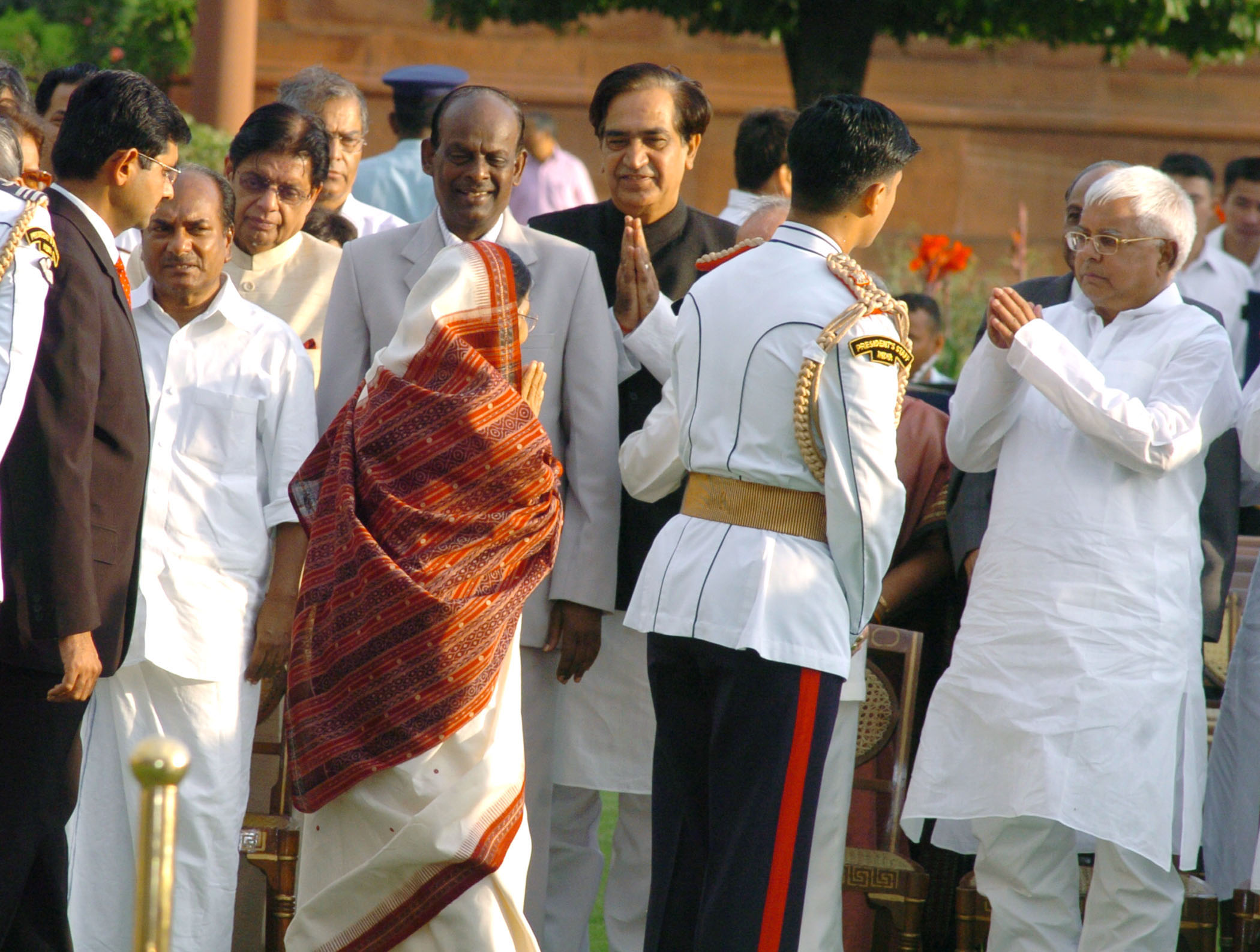
Pratibha Devisingh Patil, the Union Minister for Railways, Shri Lalu Prasad, the Defence Minister, Shri A. K. Antony, the Minister of State for Railways, Shri R. Velu, and the Minister of State for Environment and Forests.

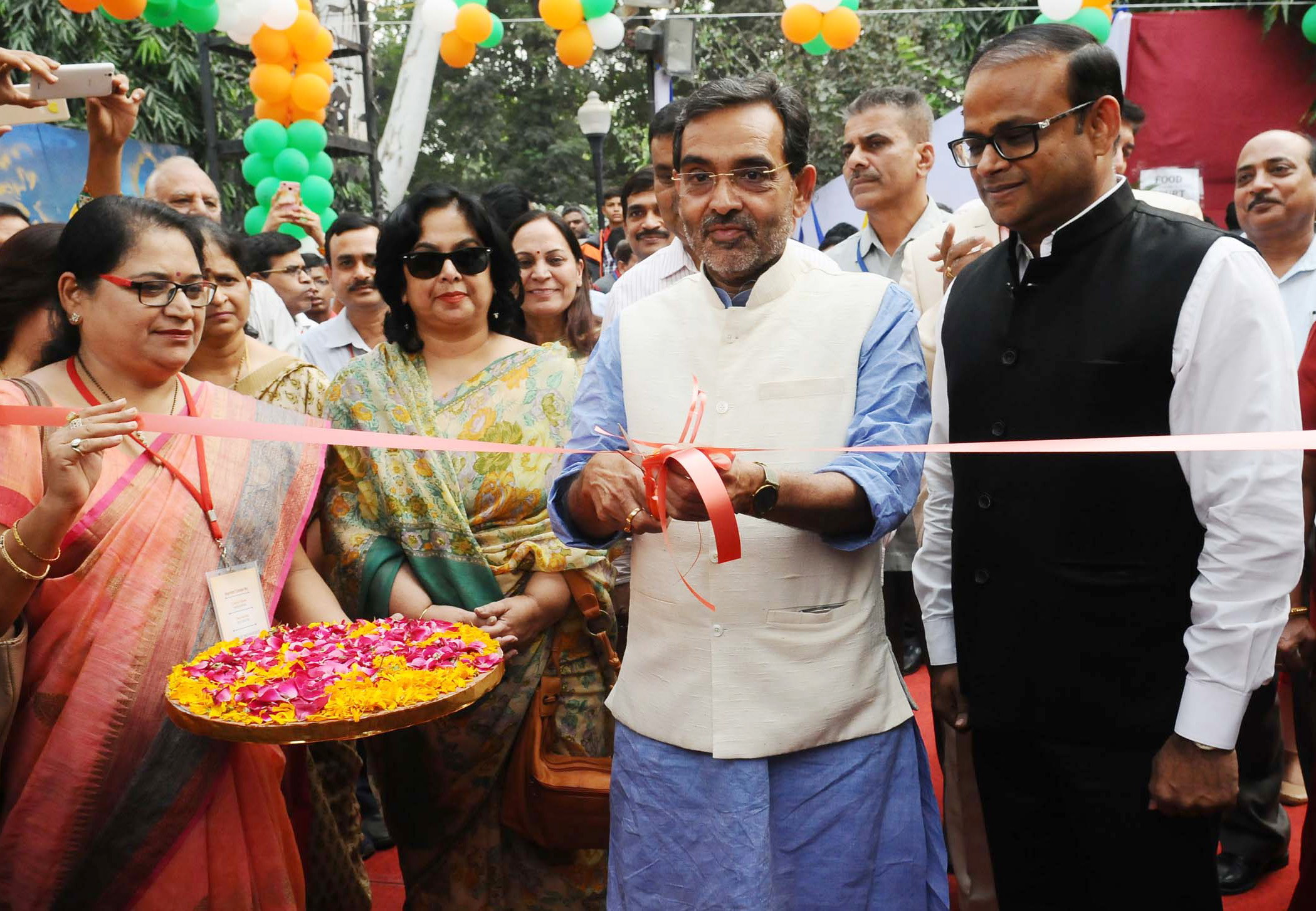
The Minister of State for Human Resource Development Shri Upendra Kushwaha inaugurating the KVS Rashtriya Ekta Shivir-2017, Ek Bharat-Shreshth Bharat, in New Delhi on October 31, 2017.

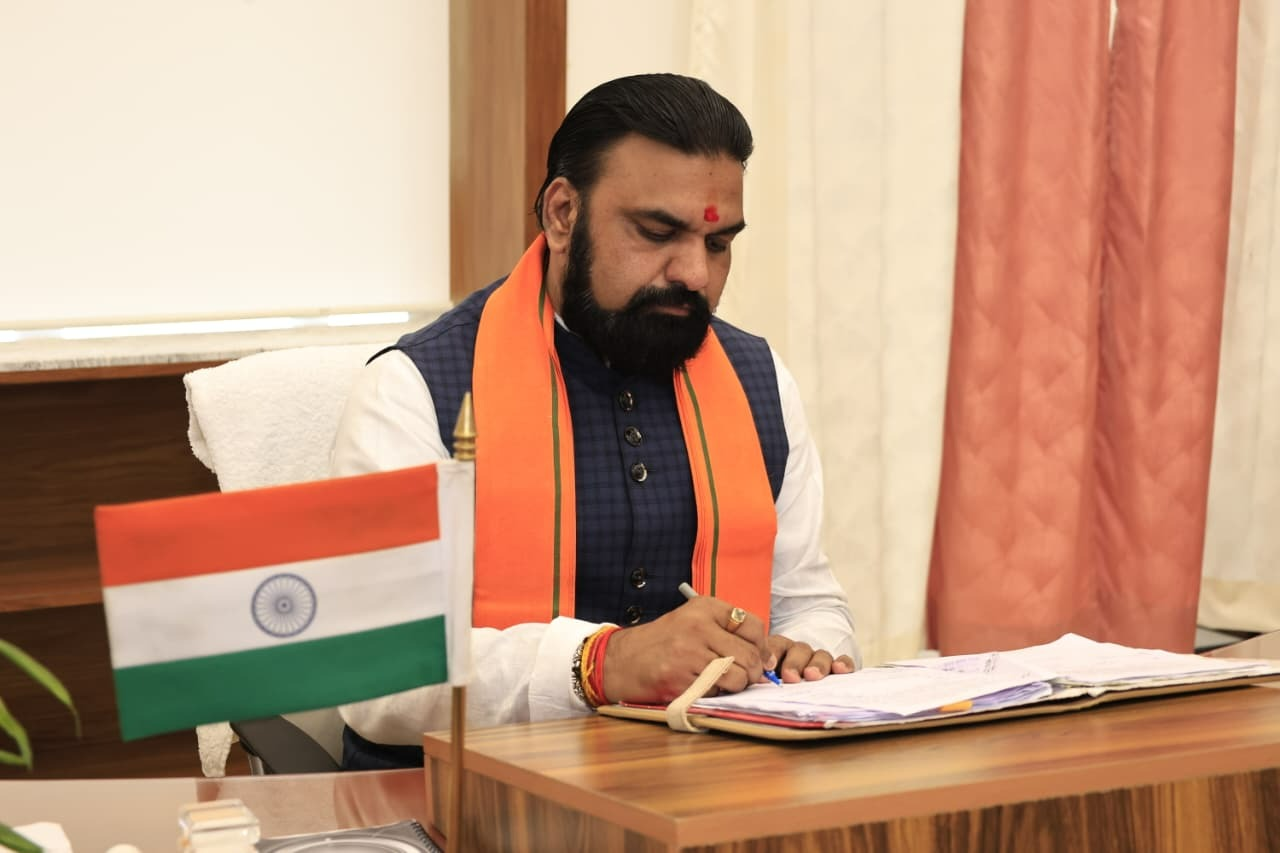
Samrat Chaudhary assuming the charge of Chief Minister of Bihar in 2026.

== Elections ==
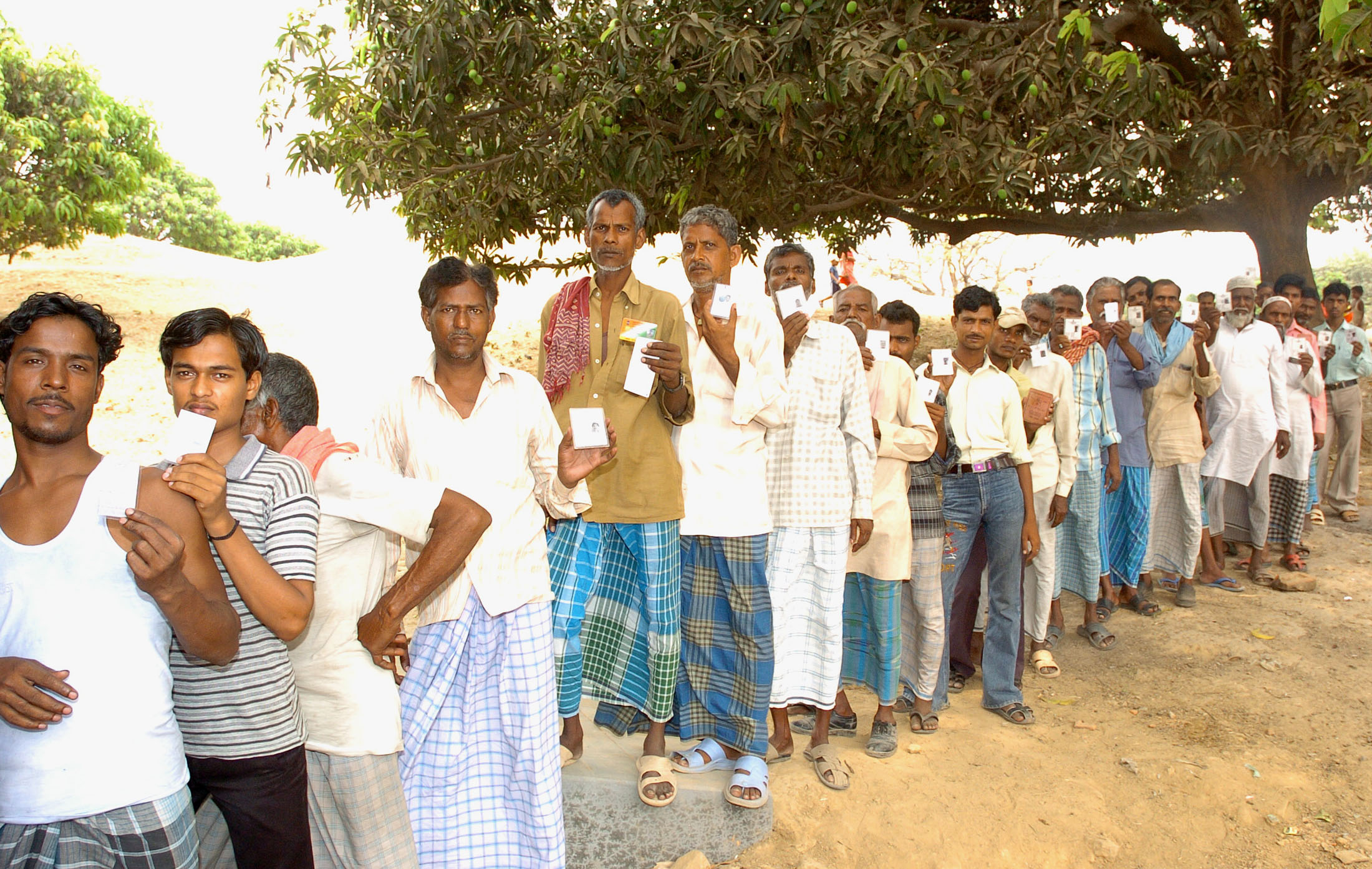
Voters display their identity cards at Samudayak Bhawan, Nathpur, Bhagalpur, Bihar, during the third phase of General Election-2009

=== General elections ===
Year	Lok Sabha Election	Total Seats	Winning Party/Coalition	Winner's seat
1951	First Lok Sabha		Indian National Congress	
1957	Second Lok Sabha		Indian National Congress	
1962	Third Lok Sabha		Indian National Congress	
1967	Fourth Lok Sabha		Indian National Congress	
1971	Fifth Lok Sabha		Indian National Congress	
1977	Sixth Lok Sabha		Indian National Congress	
1980	Seventh Lok Sabha		Indian National Congress (Indira)	
1984	Eighth Lok Sabha		Indian National Congress (Indira)	
1989	Ninth Lok Sabha		Indian National Congress (Indira)	
1991	Tenth Lok Sabha		Indian National Congress	
1996	Eleventh Lok Sabha			
1998	Twelfth Lok Sabha		National Democratic Alliance	
1999	Thirteenth Lok Sabha		National Democratic Alliance	
2004	Fourteenth Lok Sabha		National Democratic Alliance	
2009	Fifteenth Lok Sabha		National Democratic Alliance	
2014	Sixteenth Lok Sabha		National Democratic Alliance	
2019	Seventeenth Lok Sabha		National Democratic Alliance	
2024	Eighteenth Lok Sabha		National Democratic Alliance	

== Political parties in Bihar ==
=== National parties ===
- Bharatiya Janata Party
- Indian National Congress

=== Regional Parties in Bihar ===
- Rashtriya Janata Dal
- Janata Dal (United)
- Lok Janshakti Party (Ram Vilas)
- Rashtriya Lok Janshakti Party
- Hindustani Awam Morcha
- Rashtriya Lok Morcha
- Vikassheel Insaan Party
- Left Front
  - Communist Party of India
  - Communist Party of India (Marxist)
  - Communist Party of India (Marxist–Leninist) Liberation
- All India Majlis-e-Ittehadul Muslimeen.
- Jan Suraaj Party
- Janshakti Janata Dal

== See also ==
- History of Patna
- Political parties in Bihar
- List of chief ministers of Bihar
- List of deputy chief ministers of Bihar
- List of finance ministers of Bihar
- Politicians from Bihar
