= Banaut =

Branch of Bundela Rajputs

The Banaut (also known as "Bandaut" and "Bandawat") is a branch of Bundela Rajput clan found in the Indian states of Bihar and Jharkhand. Their loved ones called them Banaut which closely relates to them inhabiting the forest prone areas of Purnea , Bhagalpur, Itkhori, and Hazaribagh. They are said to have left Orchha, Jhansi, Mahoba and other parts of Bundelkhand during Mughal Empire and migrated to Bihar and Jharkhand. Many of them died fighting against the invaders . They were prominent during the Independence Movement against the British East India Company.

== Origin and History ==
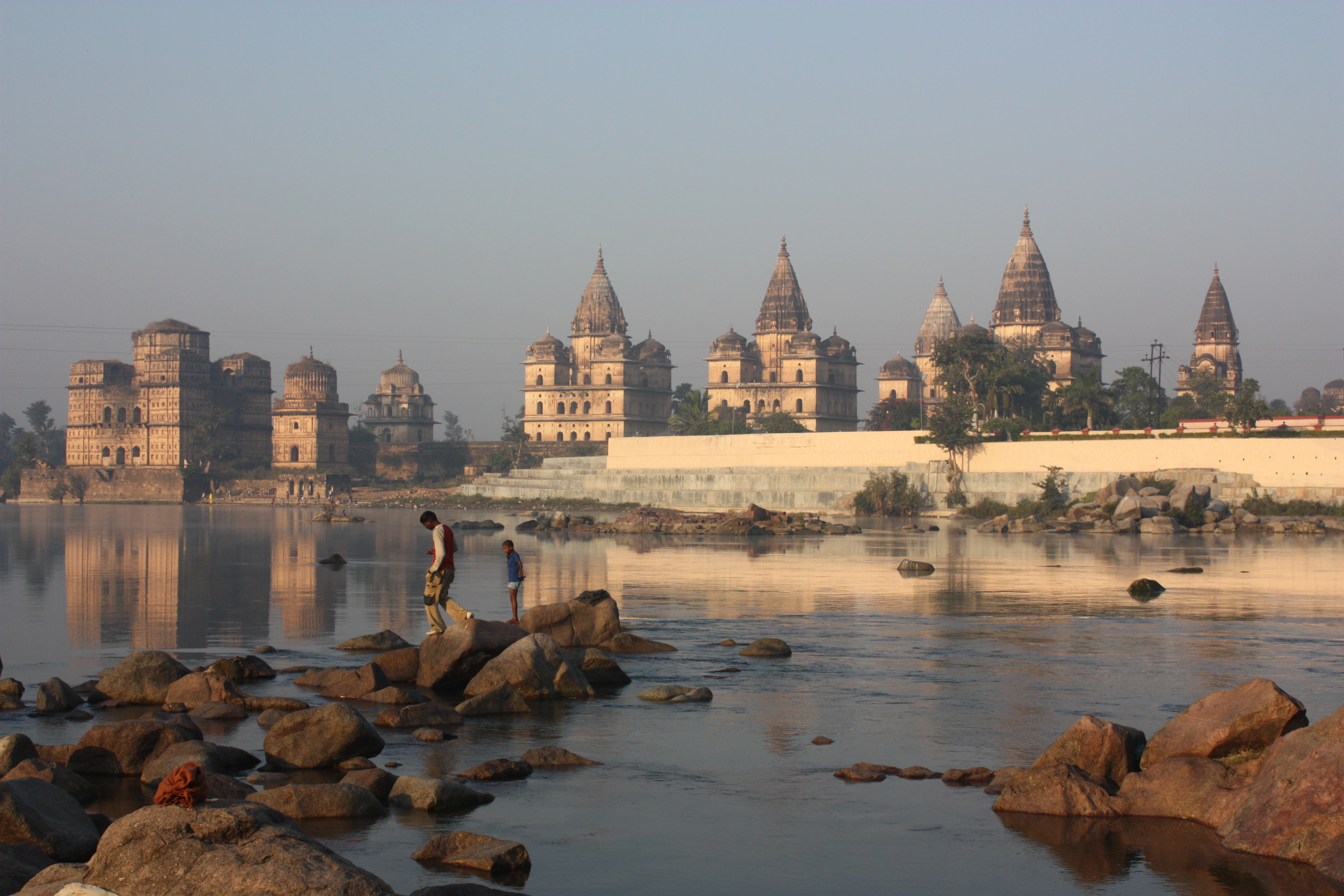
Chhatris of Orchha on the bank of Betwa river of Bundela Rulers

The Banaut originated from Bundelkhand, but later came to parts of Bihar and Jharkhand. As they were from land-owning community, they became wealthy zamindars over time and also had strong political positions.They were able to acquire notable estates like Chandwa Rupaspur in Katihar under Thakur Dhanpat Singh and Shahkund under Babu Jaikaran Singh who also served as the tehsildar to Banaili Raj. Tarar Estate was dominated and ruled by Banauts . Babu Manorath Singh of Dharhara ,Babu Vishwanath Singh of Sarsi, Babu Rajkumar Singh of Bhawanpura and Babu Agrichand Rai of Aligunj are some of the notable landlords from their respective villages.

=== Deities ===
Maa Bhadrakali Mandir of Itkhori

Banaut have their particular village deities such as Maa Kali, HanumanJi, Ram-Janaki Radhakrishna.

=== Temples ===
- Maa Jaleshwari Mandir , Bhawanpura
- Maa Bhadrakali Mandir , Itkhori

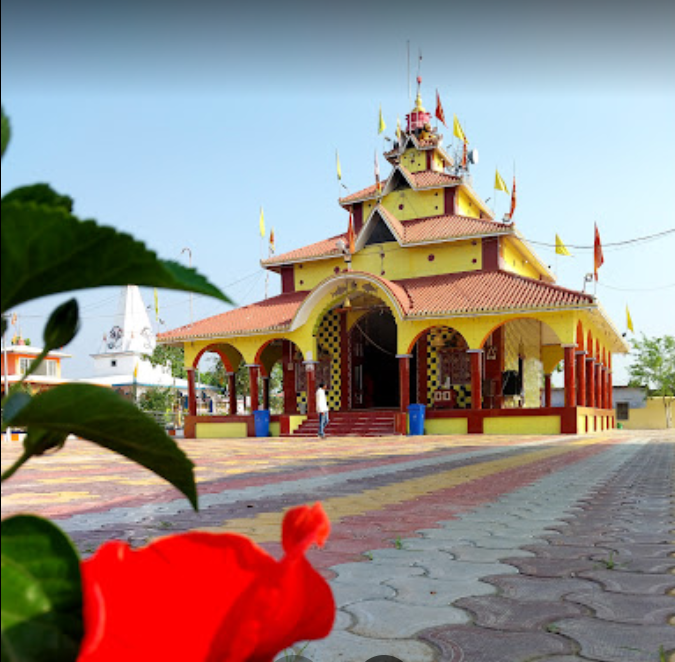
Maa Jaleshwari Mandir of Bhawanpura

=== Gotra ===
The Gotras of Banaut Rajputs are Bhardwaj, Sandilya, Suryaguru , Dhenu, Vaksh, Kashyap, Kaushik, Garg and Vishwamitra.

=== Notables of Clan ===
1. Chhatrasaal Bundela
2. Rudra Pratap Singh
3. Vir Singh Deo
4. Jhujhar Singh
5. Alha Singh
6. Udal Singh

=== Politicians ===
1. Leshi Singh
2. Shankar Singh
3. Lakshmi Narayan Sudhanshu

== Population and Language ==
Most of the Banauts live in the native villages of Anga Region of Bihar namely Bhagalpur, Munger, Katihar, Purnia, Banka, Madhepura and in some parts of Saharsa and Araria too. They live in parts of Jharkhand namely Hazaribagh . Many have migrated to bigger cities like Patna, Ranchi and Delhi for better job opportunities and lifestyle.

Majority of them speak the regional language of Anga Region (majority) followed by Magadh and Mithila - Angika followed by Magahi and Maithili along with other languages like Hindi, English.

== Villages ==
Some of the Villages of Bundela (collective data) with significance:

=== Bihar ===
==== Bhagalpur District ====
- Tarar
- Dogachchhi
- Makarpur
- Sahjadpur
- Bhawanpura
- Dharhara
- Kaharpur
- Lokmanpur

==== Munger district ====
- Belari
- Rahmatpur
- Lakhanpur
- Asarganj (township and surrounding villages)

==== Purnia district ====
- Sarsi
- Dhamdhaha
- Jalalgarh
- Aligunj
- Sukhasana
- Baghmara

==== Araria district ====
- Tamghatti
- Pothiya
- Nadhki
- Uphrail
- Narsinghpur
- Pahunsara

==== Madhepura district ====
- Kalasan

==== Katihar district ====
- Guagachhi
- Baluaghatti
- Chandwa
- Rupaspur

=== Jharkhand ===
==== Hazaribagh district ====
- Hazaribagh City
- Chouparan

==== Chatra district ====
- Itkhori
- Phulang

== See also ==
- Babu Saheb
- Bundela Rajputs
- Banaphar Rajputs
- Rajput
- Rajput clans of Bihar
- Dharahara, Tarar
- Angika
