= Tarar =

Tarar may refer to:

- Tarar, Bhagalpur
- Tarar (surname)

== See also ==
- Tarare (disambiguation)
- Tarrare (disambiguation)
- Tarari (disambiguation)
