= Bihari Rajput =

Indian caste

- Jāti: Rajput
- Classification: Forward caste
- Religions: Hinduism
- Languages: Hindi; Magahi; Bhojpuri; Maithili
- Country: India; Nepal; Australia; Canada; Fiji; Guyana; Jamaica; Mauritius; Netherlands; New Zealand; South Africa; Suriname; Trinidad and Tobago; United Kingdom; United States
- Populated states: Bihar; Uttar Pradesh; Jharkhand
- Related groups: other Rajputs

Rajputs in Bihar are members of the Rajput community living in the eastern Indian state of Bihar. The Rajputs in Bihar are addressed by titles such as ‘Babuaan’ They traditionally formed part of the feudal elite in Bihari society. Rajputs were pressed with the Zamindari abolition and Bhoodan movement in post-independence India; along with other Forward castes, they lost their significant position in Bihar's agrarian society, leading to the rise of Other Backward Classes (OBCs).

== History ==
From 1200 CE, many Rajput groups moved eastwards towards the Eastern Gangetic plains, forming their own chieftaincies. These minor Rajput kingdoms were scattered across the Gangetic plains of modern-day Uttar Pradesh and Bihar. During this process, petty clashes with Native populations occurred and in some cases, alliances were formed. Among these Rajput chieftaincies were the zamindars of Bhojpur and the taluks of Awadh.

The migration of Rajput clan chiefs into these parts of the Gangetic Plains also contributed to the agricultural appropriation of previously forested areas, especially in Southern Bihar. Some historians have linked this eastwards expansion with the onset of Ghurid invasion in the West.

These groups included the Ujjainiya clan of Parmar Rajputs. Gajpati Ujjainia of the same clan was a chieftain and commander in the army of Sher Shah Suri. In the early 18the century, Kunwar Dhir, a Rajput Zamindar of Bhojpur district rebelled and fought against the Mughal Empire.

In the Middle Ages, Rajput migrants to the region of Bihar founded the Gidhaur Raj, Deo Raj, Namudag Raj and Kharagpur Raj. In the same period, the Rajput Gandhavariya clan controlled a significant portion of North Bihar. The Sonbarsa Raj also belonged to this clan. What brought success to these Hindu princelings was the strong clan organisation upon which they rested.

From the 16th century, Rajput soldiers from the eastern regions of Bihar and Awadh were recruited as mercenaries for Rajputs in the west, particularly in the Malwa region. During the Great Uprising of 1857, a section of Rajputs participated under the leadership of Kunwar Singh, who was the main leader of the revolution in Bihar.

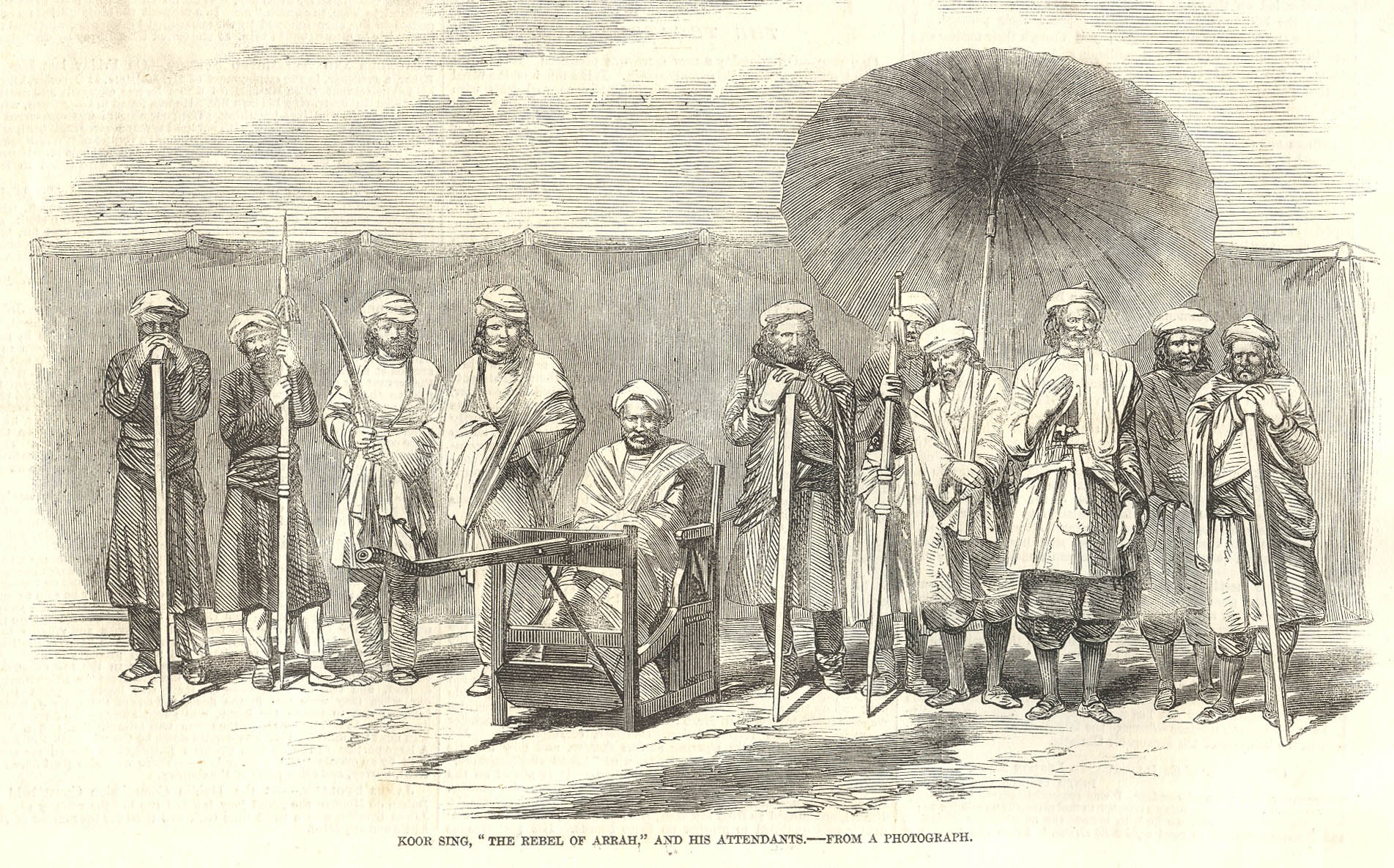
Veer Kunwar Singh and his attendants, Jagdishpur Raj

In the traditional agrarian society of Bihar in the pre-independence period, Rajputs were among the upper castes that controlled the agricultural production through Zamindari rights. Some of the upper-castes were also recruited to the lower level of administration under the British rulers. Rajputs, a less-literate relative of other upper castes, played a limited role in public administration and were primarily property holders. Between 1900 and 1920, it was noted that Rajputs formed a large portion of the population of some regions of southern Bihar. In Shahabad region, where Rajputs were prominent, they took little or no interest in intellectual pursuits. The literacy rate of the region and of Bihar as a whole was also in precarious state.

In post-independence India, pressed with the Zamindari abolition and Bhoodan movement, Rajputs and other upper castes lost their prominence in the agrarian society of Bihar.

Oliver Mendelsohn and Marika Vicziany said the "untouchables" who formed the bottom of society in Bihar have clashed with communities, including Yadavs and Kurmis in the middle segment, While Rajputs, Bhumihars and Brahmins in the upper segment of society. The authors have identified land control as the major characteristic of the opponents and not the caste identity. According to Mendelsohn and Vicziany, the exploiters of the untouchables doesn't have the same caste identity in all the region, and the conflicts were not restricted to Bihar. The Rajputs and Bhumihars and not the Brahmin and Kayastha being the major landowners among the upper castes is also supported by a study by sociologist Badri Narayan. In Shahabad district, some Rajput and Bhumihar landowners frequently raped lower-caste women, and by the 1930s, the Triveni Sangh gave the abused women a platform to express her frustration.

In a survey conducted in a few villages in Bhojpur, rape of lower-caste women from Musahar and Chamar castes by Rajput and Bhumihar landlords was a major cause of anguish until the emergence of Naxalism.

According to Fernando Franco, in parts of central Bihar, who describes the condition of women agricultural laborers; "Even as late as the 1970s, the rape of lower caste women by [some]Rajputs/Bhumihars[landlords] had almost become a tradition, an accepted social evil, a fate which many bore unquestioningly".

Ranabir Samaddar cited an example of an Anwa village in which upper-caste Rajputs practiced Dola Pratha; newly wedded brides of Dalits and landless labourers had to spend one night with the landlord before having sex with her husband. According to a report from Sonatola village in Bihar, in the neighbouring village Berath, some Dalit women said when lower-caste women rejected the landlord's proposal of sexual contact, it was common for the landlords to falsely implicate the male members of their families and their kin in criminal cases. Besides sexual assaults, the drawing of water from the village wells and walking on the pathways alongside the landlords in that village were forbidden for the lower castes. By the 1960s, most of the prevalent feudal practices came to an end due to the activism of Kisan Sabhas, an organization led by middle-peasant castes who also campaigned for women rights and dignity, and allowed agricultural-labourer women to speak for themselves.

Later, assertion of many left-wing organizations took place in Bihar, the most prominent among them being Maoist Communist Centre of India (MCC), which waged wars against the landlords for the cause of lower castes. In Bihar, the prime targets of this organisation were Rajputs, against whom most of the caste-inspired massacres were committed. The events at "Darmian" and Dalelchak-Bhagaura, among others, are considered caste-based violence perpetrated against Rajputs by MCC.

In the 1990s, the accession of Lalu Prasad Yadav to the premiership of Bihar brought socio-economic changes in the state's feudal society. Under the leadership of Anand Mohan Singh, a campaign against the Mandal Commission was undertaken in the state. The movement was also opposed to the rule of Lalu Prasad Yadav. Pappu Yadav, an associate of Yadav and a Janta Dal leader, led a campaign of violence against the "Upper Castes".

== Politics ==
At the time of independence, Rajputs and other upper castes had a monopoly in the Indian National Congress (INC) and Bihar state politics. Over time, conflict within the upper-caste groups emerged in the INC, and Rajputs and Bhumihars became major challengers of the dominance of the Kayastha caste. This period saw the emergence of Bhumihars as the most-significant caste group within the INC; to counter the Bhumihars, Rajputs allied with Kayasthas, leading to intense inter-caste conflicts at all level of politics in Bihar and rise of caste-based political patronage, crippling the state's politics in later years.

According to Sanjay Kumar, before the 1990s, the dominance of the upper castes such as Rajputs, Brahmins, Bhumihars and Kayasthas in Bihari society, politics, the judiciary and bureaucracy prevented the implementation of land reforms in the state, which could have helped Scheduled Castes and Backward castes. In the post-Mandal phase, Kurmi, Koeri and Yadav, the three backward castes who constitute the upper-OBC due to their advantageous position in the socio-economic sphere of agrarian society, became the new political elite of the state. One of the causes of this change was weakening of the INC in the state, which was long-dominated by upper castes. The rising Kulaks from the upper-OBC supported the Lok Dal political party for their emancipation and jostled with the erstwhile political elites, the upper castes. According to Sanjay Kumar, after a long, protracted struggle, the upper castes accepted the leadership of OBCs during this phase.
In the recent decade, however, upper castes have returned to the power structure, holding prominent positions.

Some of the leaders of the community also played important roles in the Rashtriya Janata Dal-led government, which includes Raghuvansh Prasad Singh, who conceptualised MNREGA, the biggest anti-poverty scheme in India. Radha Mohan Singh has been credited for the growth of the BJP in the state while being state chief from 2006 to 2009.

== Present circumstances ==
Rajputs of Bihar have been a socially dominant community, as they are fairly represented in the legislative assembly and legislative council of Bihar, despite risen hostility towards upper-castes. This community also has largest representation in Lok Sabha and Rajya Sabha MPs from Bihar. According to a report of Institute of Human Development Studies, Brahmins topped the average per-capita income with Rs 28,093; Rajputs have an average per-capita income of Rs 20,655, closely followed by middle-agrarian castes such as Kushwahas and Kurmis, who earned Rs 18,811 and Rs 17,835, respectively, as their average per-capita income. In contrast, Yadavs’ income is one of the lowest among OBCs at Rs 12,314, which is slightly less than the rest of the OBCs at Rs 12,617. Despite the political mobilisation of backward castes in the post-Mandal period, Rajputs are still among the high-income groups in Bihar. According to this report, the economic benefits of the Mandal politics have not reached castes of agrarian background, leading to their upward mobility.

== Kingdoms and chieftaincies founded by Rajputs in Bihar ==
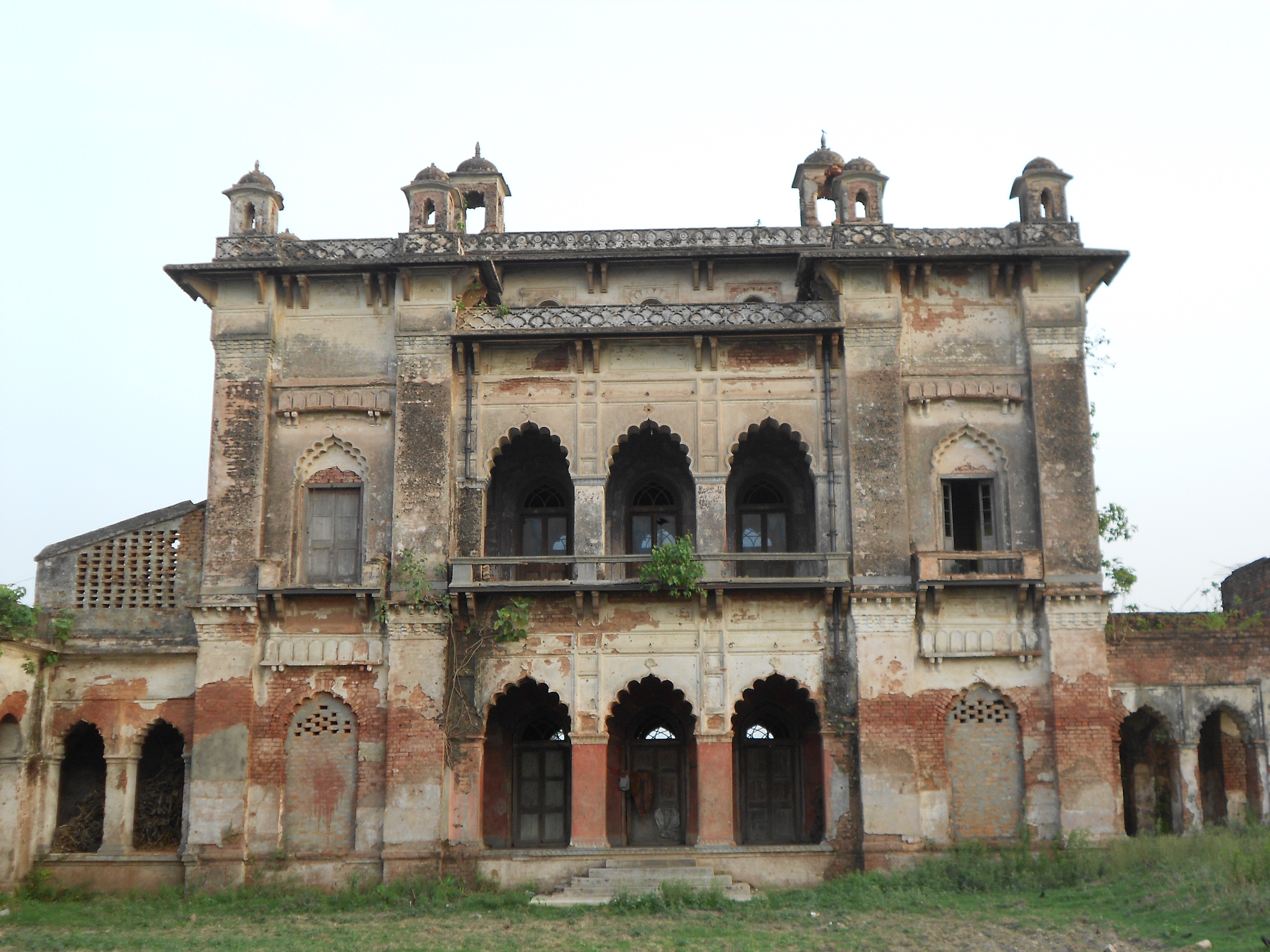
The Palace of Sonbarsa Raj

- Sonbarsa Raj founded by Gandhavariya Rajputs in medieval period.
- Kharagpur Raj founded in the 16th century by Kinwar Rajputs
- Namudag Raj founded in the 16th century by the Gaur rajput,
- Gidhaur chieftaincy founded in the 14th century by Chandel Rajputs
- Jagdishpur Raj and Dumraon Raj founded by the Ujjainiya Rajputs
- Deo Raj founded in the 15th century by Sisodia Rajputs in Bihar.
- Ramgarh Raj in the Chhota Nagpur Plateau region.

== Notable people ==
- Harihar Singh - 9th Chief Minister of Bihar
- Kunwar Singh - Zamindar and Military commander who participated in the Indian Rebellion of 1857
- Ram Subhag Singh - Leader of the Opposition in Lok Sabha, Minister of State for Food and Agriculture, Minister of State for Railways, Minister of Railways, Minister of Parliamentary Affairs, Minister of Communications and Information Technology, and Minister of Social Security and Cottage Industries
- Bhishma Narain Singh - he belongs to the Namudag Raj and was former governor of the Assam.
- Anugrah Narayan Sinha - Indian nationalist statesman known as Bihar
- Raja Narain Singh - Chieftain of the Seris and Kutumba estate in Aurangabad district and participant in the 1781 revolt in Bihar
- Gajpati Ujjainia - Commander in the army of the Sur Empire under Sher Shah Suri
- K.B.N. Singh - Chief Justice of Patna and Madras High Court, served as an acting Governor of Bihar. From the illustrious Kulharia Raj family.
- Kamal Singh - Last Maharaja of Dumraon Raj(Ujjainiya Rajput) and Member of Parliament.
- Digvijay Singh - From the Gidhaur Royal family, Union Minister for several times.
- Collectar Singh "Kesari" - Poet and novelist from erstwhile Shahabad district.
- R. K. Singh - Union minister of Power and Renewable energy from bhojpur.
- Malkhan Singh - Several times MLA from Jamshedpur.
- Sushant Singh Rajput - Indian actor
