= Gandhavariya =

Rajput Clan in Bihar

The Gandhavariya (also known as Gandhawariya and Gandhawaria) are a Rajput clan based in northern Bihar. They ruled over parts of Madhepura district and Saharsa district during medieval times after the decline of the Oiniwar Dynasty.

== Origin ==
One of the theories put forward about the origins of the Gandhavariyas is that they originate from a branch of the Karnat dynasty of Mithila that remained in the region after the Karnat king, Harisimhadeva fled to Kathmandu following the invasion of Ghiyasuddin Tughlaq.

== History ==
The writer Jyotirishwar Thakur recorded the existence of the Gandhavariyas Rajaputas in his 14th century book Varṇa Ratnākara and detailed how they held sway over much of North Bihar. The traditions of the Gandhavariyas record that prior to their ascendancy in the region, they were engaged in a war with the Bhar who the Gandhavariyas claim to have finished.

The zamindari estate of Sonbarsa Raj was established by Raja Ranjit Singh who belonged to the Gandhavariya clan. They also controlled Baruari and Barail.

== See also ==
- Sonbarsa Raj
- Bihari Rajputs
- Rajputs
- Banauts
