= Mayi (clan) =

The Mayi were a clan of Muslim Rajputs which controlled the Narhat-Samai chieftaincy in modern-day Nawada district of Bihar.

== History ==
The progenitor of the Mayi clan was Nuraon Khan whose family arrived in South Bihar in the 17th century from Delhi, ultimately hailing from Talwandi in Punjab; Mayi clan was originally a branch of Bhatti Rajputs. Following the conversion to Islam, they retained their original clan name.

Nuraon Khan had two sons, Azmeri and Deyanut who worked for a Rajput King of Sisodia clan as revenue farmers. Kamgar Khan waged war on neighbouring zamindars and seized their land. However, he was a staff of the Deo Raj who was also expanding his chieftaincy. Despite the Mayi's owing much of their power to the Rajput and the Mughals, Kamgar Khan frequently defied them and attempted to assert the Mayi's independence. Eventually, Afghan mercenaries had to be used to put down the rebellions of Kamgar Khan.

Kamgar Khan's descendant was Akbar Ali. Under his rule, Narhat Samai was owed a large amount of unpaid revenue to the British East India Company. To escape his debts, he participated in the 1781 revolt where certain zamindars attempted to rid themselves of British rule. Akbar Ali's attempt to gain independence failed however, and his estate was confiscated and he fled to Delhi.

== Notable members ==
- Daulat Khan Mayi
