= Tarare (disambiguation) =

Tarare is a commune in eastern France. Tarare or Tarrare may also refer to

- Canton of Tarare in eastern France
- Tarare (opera) by Antonio Salieri

== See also ==
- Tarari (disambiguation)
- Tarrare (disambiguation)
- Tarar (disambiguation)
