= Private army =

Non-governmental military force

A private army (or private military) is a military force under the command of a private person or organization, rather than a nation or state.

== History ==
Private armies may form when landowners arm household retainers for the protection of self and property in times of strife, and where and when central government is weak. Such private armies existed for example in the Roman Empire following the collapse of central authority. The dynamics at play in such circumstances can be observed in modern-day Colombia: on the one hand there are those forces affiliated with the drug cartels, existing to protect their criminality, and on the other those of the landlords created to resist kidnappings and extortion, i.e. Muerte a Secuestradores and the Autodefensas Unidas de Colombia.

In many places these private household retainers evolved into feudal-like structures, formalising obligations and allegiances and becoming household troops, and in some cases gaining the strength to allow them to usurp power from their nominal suzerain or to create new sovereign states.

Private armies may also form when co-religionists band together to defend themselves from real and perceived persecution and to further their creed, for example the Hussites, the Mormon Nauvoo Legion and the Mahdi Army in Iraq; because of their nature, such militias are formed by or fall under the influence of charismatic leaders, and can become instruments of personal ambition.

== Examples ==
=== East Asia ===
- Sōhei: the warrior monks of Japan owed their loyalty not to the state or even the Emperor but to their monasteries.
- The Presidency armies of the British East India Company, and the armed forces of the Dutch East India Company. Both possessed powerful armies and navies, administering areas many times the size of their homelands.
- The militaries of the Indian princely states, during the British Raj, which were mainly for ceremonial duties, protection of their princes, and internal security within their states.
- Chinese Junfas during the Warlord Era following the death of Yuan Shikai in 1916.
- The SMR Zone defence force in Manchukuo.
- The Royal Johor Military Force of the state of Johor is the private royal guard of the Sultan of Johor in Malaysia.
- In the Philippines, the revolutionary Emilio Jacinto formed his own guerrilla force rather than join the Filipino Army. During World War II, some private armies such as the Bisigbakal ñg Tagala, Makapili, and Pambansang Pag-asa ng mga Anak ni Rizal were formed to support the Japanese. After the war, there were the Civilian Guards (Guardia Civil) formed by landowners in the Central Luzon to fight the Huks. After martial law was declared in 1972, the army broke up 149 private armies loyal to politicians in provincial areas. In 2001, the Ampatuan Militia was formed, and in 2009 it committed a massacre, which led to its disbandment in the same year. In 2013, militants claiming to be the Royal Forces of the Sultanate of Sulu tried to invade Sabah at the direction of a claimant to the throne.

=== Europe ===
- Victual Brothers, a pirate brotherhood that for a time became a power in the Baltics.
- Atholl Highlanders, a purely ceremonial group which claims to be the only private army in Europe.
- German Freikorps after the First World War were usually only loyal to their commanders, and not to the Weimar Republic.
- Crusading orders: for example the Knights Templar, Knights Hospitaller and the Teutonic Knights.

=== Russia and Caucasus ===
- The Russian Wagner Group had been accused of being the private army of Yevgeny Prigozhin.

=== Americas ===
- The Mongoose Gang was a private army or militia which operated from 1967 to 1979 under the control of Sir Eric Gairy, the Premier and later Prime Minister of Grenada.
- The Sea Organization originally began as Scientology founder L. Ron Hubbard's private navy.

=== India ===
- Kuer Sena, a Rajput private army which operated in the Indian state of Bihar during the 1970s and 1980s.
- Lorik Sena, a Yadav private army which operated in the Indian state of Bihar from 1982 to 1990.
- Bhumi Sena, a Awadhiya kshatriye private army which operated in the Indian state of Bihar from 1982 to 1990.
- Ranvir Sena, a Bhumihar private army is a functioning militia group in the Indian state of Bihar.

== See also ==
- Mercenary
  - Condottiero
- Private military company
- Private, a common rank in armies worldwide, deriving its title from the term "private soldier"

=== Regular military or paramilitary force whose allegiance is to one person or group. ===
- Iraqi Republican Guard
- National Guard of Russia
- Waffen-SS of Nazi Germany's Schutzstaffel (SS) of the German Nazi Party

=== Armed branch of a political party or movement ===
- Iraqi People's Army of the Ba'ath Party
- Sturmabteilung of the German Nazi Party
- Blackshirts of the Italian National Fascist Party
- Blueshirts of the Chinese Kuomintang
- National Liberation Army of the People's Mujahedin of Iran
- al-Aqsa Martyrs' Brigades of the Fatah/PLO
- Izz ad-Din al-Qassam Brigades of the Hamas
- Jewish Defense League of the Kach and Kahane Chai
- Kataeb Regulatory Forces of the Kataeb Party
- Eagles of the Whirlwind of the Syrian Socialist Nationalist Party
- Grey Wolves of the Turkish Nationalist Movement Party
- New People's Army of the Communist Party of the Philippines
- People's Liberation Army of the Chinese Communist Party
- uMkhonto we Sizwe of the African National Congress
- Ukrainian Insurgent Army of the Organisation of Ukrainian Nationalists
- Various armed groups of Hezbollah
- Waffen-SS of Nazi Germany's Schutzstaffel (SS) of the German Nazi Party
