= 1781 revolt in Bihar =

Uprising against the British East India Company

Date	August – December 1781
Location	Western and Southern Bihar
Result	British East India Company victory: Suppression of revolt

Belligerents
British East India Company	Various zamindars and chiefs

Commanders and leaders
John Crawfurd; Captain Powell	Fateh Bahadur Sahi; Raja Narain Singh; Raja Akbar Ali Khan

Strength
Unknown	20,000 under Fateh Bahadur Shahi; 15,000 under Narain Singh; 4,000 matchlock men under Akbar Ali

The 1781 revolt in Bihar was an uprising by certain Zamindars and chieftains against the British East India Company in the Indian state of Bihar. The majority of the rebel zamindars were from South Bihar and were likely pushed to revolt due to the recurring droughts which hampered their revenue collections.

== Causes ==
Ever since the British acquired Bihar after the Battle of Buxar, many of the zamindars had been causing troubles for the administration by withholding revenue or participating in looting. The British therefore had to take expeditions to bring them back under control. Among the zamindars causing disturbances prior to the revolt were Jugal Kishore of Bettiah Raj which was one of the largest estates in Bihar.

After the Battle of Buxar, JWF James noted that the zamindars had become "restless". Following Chait Singh's rebellion in 1781 in Varanasi, many of the zamindars in Bihar used this as an opportunity to regain their autonomy. This was seen as an attempt to take advantage of the sudden challenge to British power.

== The revolt ==
The zamindar of Huseypur, Fateh Bahadur Sahi had prior to 1781, been waging a guerrilla warfare campaign against the East India Company after being deposed from his estate. Taking advantage of Chait Singh's revolt, he decided to increase the frequency of his raids and met the British forces in a pitched battle accompanied by 20,000 of his own men. However his forces were eventually routed and he was killed in battle.

The zamindar of Seris-Kutumba in Aurangabad, Raja Narain Singh, had also had a tradition of rebelling and joined Fateh Sahi's revolt. He had been remiss in providing his revenue payments. He had gathered a force of 15,000 soldiers and joined with allies of Chait Singh including Bachu Singh. His rebellion was swiftly put down by John Crawfurd and he was jailed. He was restored to his "forfeited" zamindari in 1790 after his release. He had assisted other zamindars with resources and was in secret correspondence with others in an attempt to stir up anti-British sentiment before his arrest.

Raja Akbar Ali of the Mayi clan who controlled the Narhat and Samoy estates in modern-day Gaya district also took part in the rebellion. He had previously been arrested in Patna for owing large unpaid revenue to the British. His estate had been badly affected by the Great Bengal famine of 1770. Akbar Ali likely viewed revolt as the best method of escaping the payment of his arrears. He was able to raise a body of 4000 matchlock men and they murdered a servant of the company by the name of Hotchiss. This was followed by a period of plundering in the region however he was forced to retreat by the EIC's Captain Powell. He also laid waste to neighbouring zamindaris but eventually, he was forced to flee to Delhi and his zamindari was confiscated.

== Aftermath ==
The British were able to put down the revolt without too much trouble given the disorganised approach of the rebels. In the aftermath, the British were able to reassert their control of the region and install loyal zamindars in place of the ones that had been deposed. These new zamindars could be relied upon to provide revenue when required. The revolt itself, however, could be seen as a signal of the discontent in Bihar towards the British that later reemerged in the 1857 Rebellion.

== See also ==
- Indian rebellion of 1857
