= Tarrare (disambiguation) =

Tarrare (c. 1772–1798) was a French soldier, showman, and spy known for his unusual eating habits.

Tararre may also refer to:

- Tarrare (horse)
- "Tarrare" (Atlanta), 2022 TV episode

== See also ==
- Tarare (disambiguation)
- Tarar (disambiguation)
