= Samajwadi Krantikari Sena =

Caste based militia in Bihar

Samajwadi Krantikari Sena.
- Leader: Anand Mohan Singh
- Dates active: 1979 - 1990s
- Ideology: Right-Wing; Anti Reservation politics
- Wars: Anti Reservation agitation.

The Samajwadi Krantikari Sena (Socialist Revolutionary Army) was a political organisation and private army that operated in Saharsa district of Bihar in India. It was founded in 1980 by Anand Mohan Singh and was dominated by members of the Rajput caste who formed part of the feudal elite of Saharsa district and surrounding areas but were reduced to subordinate position due to political condition of period following the implementation Mandal Commission due to spur of some rising backward castes in politics.

The Samajwadi Krantikari Sena was part of a wave of caste-based militias that were formed in Bihar during the 1970s onwards. The group claimed that its aim was to fight against the reservation policies that it believed to be as bad as the divide-and-rule policies of the British Raj. The prime objective of the Sena was to work against reservation quotas for any caste. The group, along with its leader, has also been implicated in several politically-motivated murders.

The sena primarily worked to suppress the voices of dissent from the backward communities after the Mandal politics began in 1990 and reservation for the socially and educationally backward castes was implemented. In order to suppress the supporters of Mandal Commission and to take on growing challenge to their superiority from newly emerging powerful communities from the backward caste in the caste conscious state of Bihar, the Rajputs rallied around the Sena.

However; Pappu Yadav a close associate of Lalu Prasad Yadav formed his own outfit called Mandal Sena to pose a formidable challenge to the aspirations of the Samajwadi Krantikari Sena and its leader Anand Mohan Singh. The clashes between Yadav's outfit with those dominated by upper castes and the action of Yadav's private army in retaliation against the upper castes in the Kosi region, turned the area into a crime zone.

== See also ==
- Bhumi Sena
- Ranvir Sena
- Kuer Sena
- Dalelchak-Bhagaura massacre
- Ichri massacre
- Bara massacre (India)
- Afsar massacre
