= Rahmatpur, Munger =

Rahmatpur
- village
- Location within Bihar Location within India
- Coordinates: 25°09′52.3″N 86°41′32.4″E
- Country: India
- State: Bihar
- District: Munger
- Block: Asarganj

Population (2011)
  - Total: 4,503
- Time zone: UTC+5:30 (IST)
- Postal code: 813201
- Panchayat Code: 006065
- ISO 3166 code: IN-BR

Rahmatpur is a sizable village situated in the Asarganj Block of the Munger district, Bihar. It also functions as a Gram Panchayat and falls under the jurisdiction of the Asarganj Community Development Block. Positioned in the Ang Pradesh region of Bihar, its closest town is Munger, approximately 50 kilometers away.

== Demographics ==
A total of 861 families reside in Rahmatpur. According to the 2011 census, Rahmatpur has a population of 4503, comprising 2442 males and 2061 females. Children between the ages of 0 and 6 constitute 15.08% of the total population of the village.

=== Sex ratio ===
The average sex ratio in Rahmatpur is 844, lower than the Bihar state average of 918. The child sex ratio in Rahmatpur, as per the census, is 951, higher than the Bihar state average of 935.

=== Literacy rate ===
Rahmatpur boasts a higher literacy rate compared to Bihar. In 2011, the literacy rate of Rahmatpur was 72.49%, whereas Bihar recorded 61.80%. Male literacy in Rahmatpur stands at 79.75%, while female literacy is at 63.70%.

=== Population density ===
Rahmatpur has a population density of 1949.35 persons per square kilometer.

== Geography and Area ==
The village is situated in Asarganj C.D. Block of Munger District in the state of Bihar, India.

The total area of Rahmatpur is 231 hectares as per data available for the year 2009.

The total sown/agricultural area is 231 hectares. Of this, approximately 143.3 hectares are unirrigated, while about 87.7 hectares are irrigated. The irrigation of these 87.7 hectares is facilitated by canal water.

== Language ==
The predominant and most spoken language in Rahmatpur is Angika, as it falls within Munger, which is part of the Ang Pradesh region of Bihar. Additionally, most villagers can understand and converse in Hindi.

== Religion ==
The predominant religion in Rahmatpur is Hinduism.
