= Dharhara, Bhagalpur =

Dharhara
- village
- Location within Bihar Location within India
- Coordinates: 25°21′49.6″N 87°08′07.3″E
- Country: India
- State: Bihar
- District: Bhagalpur
- Block: Gopalpur

Population (2023)
  - Total: 6,000+
- Time zone: UTC+5:30 (IST)
- Postal code: 811212
- Area code: 06344
- ISO 3166 code: IN-BR

Dharhara is a village in the Gopalpur block of Bhagalpur district of Bihar, India. There is a tradition of plantation when a girl is born in any family of this village. The main source of income of the village is agriculture but with time people also have shown their interest in the business field for example, setting up of some industries.

== Geography ==
Dharhara is located at 25°21'49.6"N 87°08'07.3"E. Most of the villagers are farmers by profession. It is contiguous with Gosain Gaon to its East, Gopalpur to its South, Panchgachia to its West and Abhia to its North. Its Assembly constituency is Gopalpur Assembly and Parliamentary Constituency is Bhagalpur. Its nearest town is Naugachia and city is Bhagalpur.

== Tree plantation ritual ==
The village came into the limelight in 2010, when it was reported that the families plant a minimum of 10 trees whenever a girl child is born. The tree-planting had been going on for generations. By 2010, the village with a population of 6,000, had over 100,000 trees, mostly mango and lychee. In India, female infanticide and dowry deaths have been a big for challenge the authorities; therefore, this initiative of Dharhara's residents was hailed by the Bihar's chief minister, Nitish Kumar.

== Milestones ==
- In 2012 Republic Day Parade, Bihar's Jhanki was inspired by the ideas and plantation rituals of Dharhara. Dharhara, therefore is also known as Reformist Village.
- Regional serial "Bhaiyo Ki Ladli" which streamed on DD Kishan was based on Dharhara.
- Dharhara is the top chili exporting village in Bhagalpur district.
- Dharhara has the largest chain of mango and litchi nurseries in the entire district following Tilakpur.
- It is one of the few villages to have a Bat Viewpoint as Bats are rare in the region. The bats have gradually shifted to the new peepal tree in the village as the 250 years old peepal tree collapsed in 2022.

== Languages ==
Angika is the regional language of Dharhara as it lies in the Ang Pradesh region of Bihar.

== Religion ==
Hinduism is the predominant religion of Dharhara with a minority of 5-10 houses of Muslims.

== Places of interest ==
=== Thakurbari Temple ===
Thakurbari is the main temple complex in Dharhara village situated at the entrance of the village. It consists of the Hanuman Temple, Shivalay and Shakti Temple, Krishna Temple, and Ram Temple. There is also a Tulsi Chaura Mandir in the centre. It is spread across two acres of land consisting of a variety of trees. It is managed by Thakurbari Temple Trust and is about 200 years old. The contributors were Late Banwari Singh followed by Late Tulsi Singh and Late Munsi Singh better known as descendants of Manorath Singh Bundela. Numerous contributions were made by other villagers and some social reformers of the district too .It is symbolic structure for village's unity and culture. It is very popular Hindu pilgrim centre.

=== Sonaiya Pokhar ===
Sonaiya Pokhar, also known as Thakurbari Lake, is the main lake or pond of the village situated near the National Highways. It is popular picnic and recreation spot. It is also managed by Thakurbari Trust as it was donated by descendants of Late Manorath Singh Bundela to the trust 200 years ago. It is good place for bird watching and relaxation. Water remains in the pond all year.

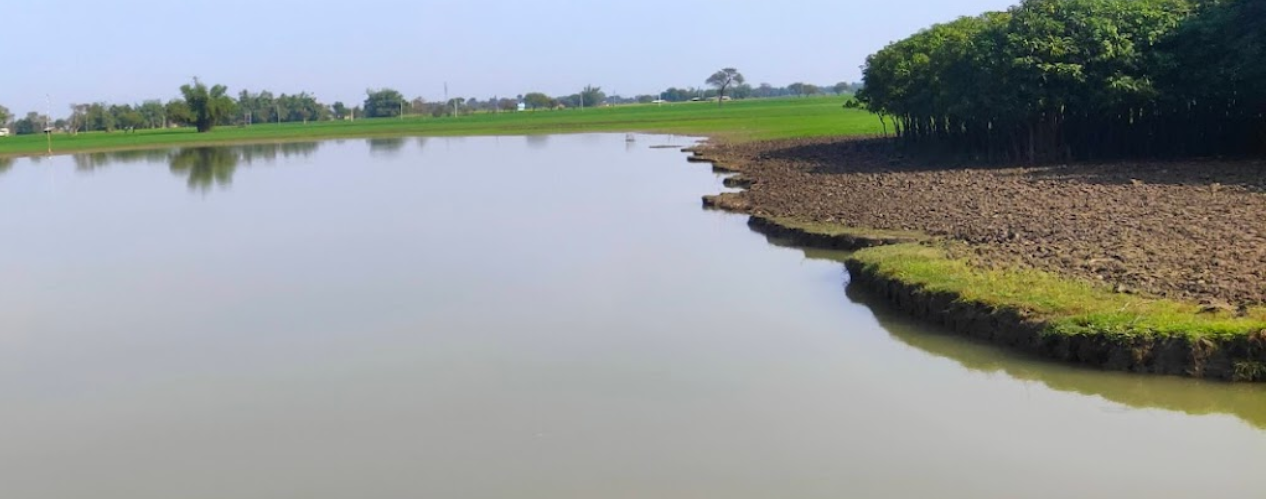
Sonaiya Pokhar

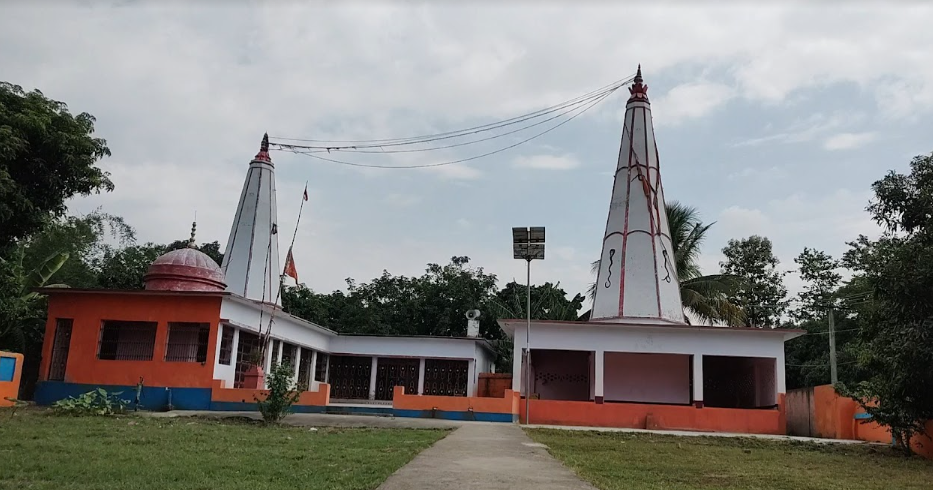
Thakurbari Temple

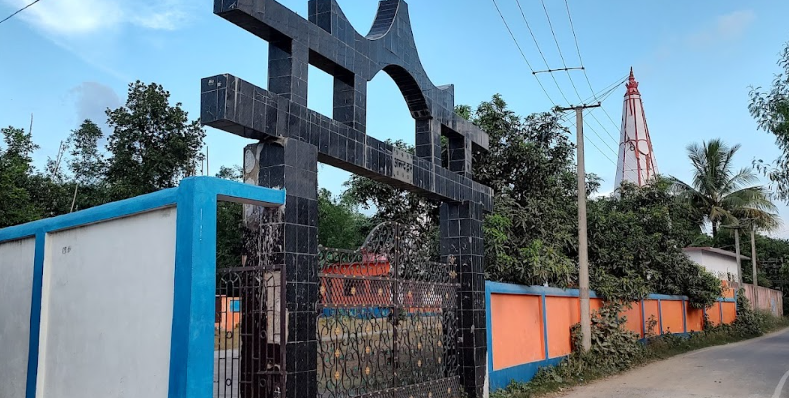
Entrance of Thakurbari Temple, Dharhara

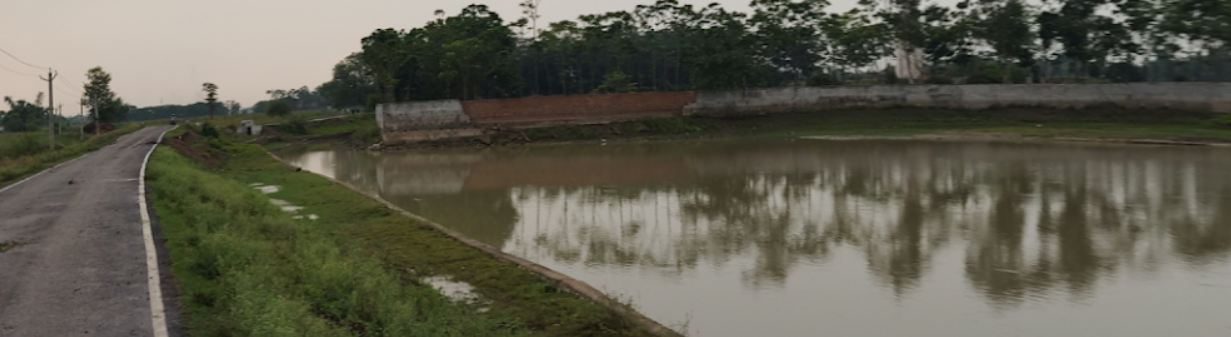
Road-View Sonaiya Lake

== Head of panchayat ==
=== Mukhiya from Dharhara ===
1. Late Hari Singh
2. Vijay Singh
3. Ranjita Devi (Present Mukhiya since 2015)
