= Kuer Sena =

Caste based militia in Bihar

- Leaders: Rajnath Singh; Bir Bahadur Singh
- Dates active: 1979–1990s
- Active regions: Western Bihar
- Ideology: Anti-communism; Rajput supremacy
- Wars: Naxalite–Maoist insurgency

The Kuer Sena was a caste-based private army operating in the Indian state of Bihar during the 1970s and 1980s. The majority of its members were young men from the Rajputs, and the militia was named after the 19th century anti-colonial revolutionary, Kunwar Singh, who is considered be a community hero by the Rajputs of Bihar.

== History ==
The Kuer Sena was one of the first of the caste-based militias to emerge in Bihar during the early years of the Naxalite-Maoist insurgency. It was founded by the Rajput farmer and coal businessman Rajnath Singh, who was also an affiliate of the Indian National Congress (INC) party. While it initially had innocent aims, it eventually grew into persecuting the people of the lower-caste who had Naxalite affiliations.

Because of this, Rajnath Singh was eventually arrested by the local government and the running of the militia was left to his commander, Bir Bahadur Singh. Bir Bahadur Singh was also known to the local authorities and was connected to some 20 murder cases, meaning that he was often in and out of jail. He was eventually elected as an MLA for the Jagdispur area and his tenure was mired by atrocities against the so-called "lower castes". They regularly engaged in battles with the MCC militias and often found themselves allying with other caste-based militias like the Ranvir Sena which was controlled by the Bhumihars and the Bhumi Sena controlled by the Awadhiya kshatriye.

== Disintegration ==
The organisation ended up collapsing due to its over-reliance on a few Rajput landlords as leadership, many of whom were often sent to jail. The Rajputs soon started to band around a new caste-based militia known as the Sunlight Sena which was formed in the early 1990s and allied with Muslim landlords in the region.

== See also ==
- List of caste based violence in Bihar
- Bhumi Sena
- Ramashish Koeri gang
- Ranvir Sena
- Samajwadi Krantikari Sena
- Lorik Sena
