= Namudag =

Village in Jharkhand, India

- Location in Jharkhand, India Namudag (India)
- Coordinates: 24.344346°N 84.293977°E
- Country: India
- State: Jharkhand
- District: Palamu

Namudag is a village and was an erstwhile estate in the Chhatarpur Block, Palamu district, Jharkhand state, India.

== Location ==
It is located 48 km north of the district headquarters, Daltonganj; 12 km from Chhattarpur; and 177 km from the state capital, Ranchi. Namudag's Pin code is 822113 and the postal head office is Chhatarpur. Marwa (4 km), Munkeri (5 km), Khairadohar (6 km), Bara (6 km), Mahuwari (7 km), and Karkata (7 km) are the nearby villages. Namudag is adjacent to Dumaria Block to the north, Patan Block to the south, Hariharganj Block to the north, and Kutumba Block to the north.

Hussainabad, Daltonganj, Aurangabad, and Garhwa are nearby cities.

This village is on the border of the Palamu District and the Aurangabad district, near the Bihar state border.
