= Marika Vicziany =

Marika Vicziany is a professor emeritus of South Asian studies at Monash University. She is a former director of the Monash Asia Institute. She received her PhD from SOAS University of London. Her research interests include regional security, the rise of India and China, and cultural and religious issues related to Hinduism and Islam.

She has published extensively on India, South Asia, and China. She was president of the South Asian Studies Association of Australia (SASAA). She has worked and published significantly on the city of Mumbai, including on communal violence, terrorism, social exclusion, and the lives of women. She has also worked on the Koli people that have been marginalised in the city.
