= Lorik Sena =

Caste-based private army in Bihar, India

- Dates active: 1980–1990
- Headquarters: Jaitipur village
- Active regions: Nalanda and Jehanabad districts
- Wars: Naxalite–Maoist insurgency

The Lorik Sena was a caste-based private army of Yadav (Ahir) Community with its headquarters in Jaitipur village of the Nalanda district of Bihar. The majority of its members hailed from the Yadav community, who were organised by its founder Baiju Yadav, to launch an armed struggle against Maoists and other communities such as Bhumihars, Rajputs. It was another group after Samajwadi Shoshit Sena which recruited primarily from the Ahir-Yadav community. According to local folktales, Lorik was a legendary hero of the Yadav raiyyats (peasants) who waged a struggle against the tyranny of repressive kings and the feudal lords and held the Yadav dignity intact. These Senas were based primarily on the name of such community figures, either realistic or mythical who were venerated by whole community. While the Rajputs chose the 19th century figure, King Kunwar Singh's name for their private army, the Yadav community found their mythical hero as suitable for the same.

== History ==
The founder of the "Lorik Sena", Baiju Yadav belonged to an influential family of the Jaitipur village and was reported to have worked for Indian National Congress (INC) politician Jagdish Sharma, a powerful member of the Bihar Legislative Assembly, who hailed from the Bhumihar caste. The Sena came into existence after Indian People's Front (IPF), a radical organisation of the communists succeeded in mobilising the backward caste peasants in the region, which threatened the socially and economically advantaged Yadavs and Bhumihars of the region. The ideological differences and caste hostility between the Yadavs and Bhumihars was kept aside for a while and the richer section of Yadavs in the region tried to mobilise the majority of the poor members of their own caste by invoking the mythological tales of "Veer Lorik".

Apart from Jagdish Sharma whose electoral constituency included the Jaitipur village, the Sena's headquarters, it was also supported by Ramasharya Singh, a leader of Communist Party of India (CPI). The CPI (ML), which was leading the landless labourers and poor peasants from the backward communities, in its official document argues that the "Lorik Sena" was an attempt by the local landlords and the Congress government dominated by them to play Yadavs and Harijans against each other and create a drift in the class struggle. According to the same document, one of the major reason behind the formation of the Sena was the growing incident of cattle theft and "dacoity" (banditry) which affected some of the rich Yadavs of the area.

== Impact ==
The first incident of attack by the Sena came into light in 1985 when it assassinated a landless labourer in the Hilsa and Ekangasarai. Unlike the private militias of the upper-caste, the "Lorik Sena" didn't indulge in any big massacre and its activities involved the incidents in which less than four or five people were murdered. After the coming into being of the "Yadav caste army", Baiju Yadav became the biggest target of the Indian People Front, who barely escaped an attempt upon his life. After that incident, Sena became more aggressive. The members of the Sena frequently resorted to robbing of the properties of the Dalits and tried to capture the common ponds and pasture lands in an around its strongholds.

It was also argued that it was used by Congress politician Mahendra Prasad Singh and Communist Party of India (CPI) politician Ramasharya Singh for their own electoral benefits.

== Decline ==
Following the suit of Bhumi Sena, the Lorik Sena also declined during the 1990s due to leadership crisis arousing in it and the careful tactics of the CPI (ML) to mobilise the ordinary Yadavs against it. The CPI (ML) led both armed and political struggle to destroy the Sena cadre, in which the ordinary Yadavs around its influence zone were issued letters to refrain from joining it, as it (according to Liberation) was the potent weapon in the hand of landlords to disrupt the ongoing class war.

Like the "Bhumi Sena", it also lacked a strong ideological commitment, and in the later period of time came to be dominated by criminal elements under the leadership of Ramanand Yadav, who was patronised by the leaders of various political parties. The "Party Unity", another armed militia of the Maoists assassinated Ramanand Yadav in 1990 following its policy of eliminating hardcore leaders of the armed militia of the landlords leading to leadership crisis.

Further, the founder leader Baiju Yadav also joined Rashtriya Janata Dal (RJD) in 1995 and the remaining members of his private army came into electoral politics lured by new opportunities it provided to the Yadavs after the emergence of Lalu Yadav in the 1990s.

== See also ==
- Bhumi Sena
