= Gosain Gaon =

- village
- Location in Bihar, India Gosain Gaon (India)
- Coordinates: 25.372374°N 87.104931°E
- Country: India
- State: Bihar
- District: Bhagalpur

Languages
  - Official: Hindi, Maithili, Angika, English
- Time zone: UTC+5:30 (IST)

Gosain Gaon is a village in Bhagalpur, Bihar, India.
