= Tarari =

Tarari may refer to:

- Tarari (company), chip manufacturer
- Tarari, Bihar, a village and CDB in India
  - Tarari (Vidhan Sabha constituency)

== See also ==
- Tarare (disambiguation)
