= Raja Narain Singh =

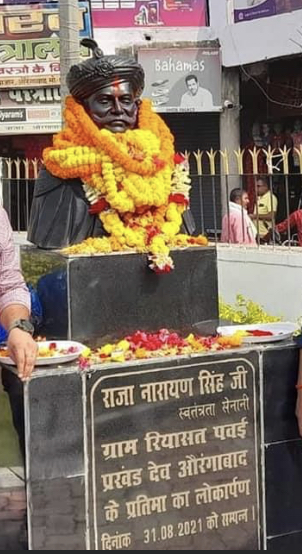
Bust of Raja Narayan Singh in Aurangabad, Bihar

Raja Narain Singh (also called Raja Narayan Singh) was a Chauhan Rajput Zamindar of Seris and Kutumba in modern-day Aurangabad district of Bihar (then a part of Gaya district) in India. He was active during the late 18th century and was notable for rebelling against the British East India Company.

== Revolt against the East India Company ==
Narain Singh had a tradition of rebelling from 1770 onwards and decided to join the revolt of Chait Singh of Varanasi in 1781. He was one among many rebels in Bihar who rose against the East India Company during that same period.

He had been remiss in providing his revenue payments to the EIC and was therefore deposed and lost his lands. In response he had gathered a force of 1500 matchlockmen and joined with allies of Chait Singh including Bachu Singh and together they amassed a force of 15,000. He posted his men at the foot of the Argoor pass with the intention of intercepting the incoming British force. The British leader, Crawfurd found out about this and changed his route. He ended up virtually encircling Narain Singh's forces. Caught in a hopeless position, he somehow managed to escape to Patna where he surrendered before the revenue chief in March 1782. He was subsequently jailed in Patna until 1786. He was restored to his "forfeited" zamindari in 1790 after his release. He had assisted other zamindars with resources and was in secret correspondence with others in an attempt to stir up anti-British sentiment before his arrest.

== Legacy ==
Some regard him as one of the first "freedom fighters" in India against British rule.
