= Asarganj =

Asarganj Rahmatpur
- Nagar Panchayat
- Asarganj
- Location in Bihar, India
- Coordinates: 25.15°N 86.68°E
- Country: India
- State: Bihar
- District: Munger
- Elevation: 44 m (144 ft)

Population (2011)
  - Total: 20,000

Language
  - Official and Regional: Hindi, Angika
- Time zone: UTC+5:30 (IST)
- PIN: 813201

Asarganj is urban area in Munger district in the state of Bihar, India.

== Geography ==
Asarganj is located at 25.15°N 86.68°E. It has an average elevation of 44 metres (144 feet).

The month-long festival "Bol-Bum" runs during the month of Saawan (August–September). After taking water from the Ganges river of Sultanganj (known locally as Uttar Wahini Ganga), pilgrims travel barefoot for 105 km on a route to Deoghar to pour Gangajal on Lord Shiva.

Nearby villages are Narayanpur, kamargama, Darha, Saraun, Dhuriya, Makva in the west-Lakhanpur in the south - Kastikari, Rahmatpur in the east and Vikrampur in the north.

== Economy ==
Asarganj is known in Bihar for the production of quality rice. Here, people work in mills and mostly do wood related work. Asarganj is also popular for its wood designing work which is involved in making sofas, chairs, and other equipment related to carpentry work. Business of clothes and vegetables are the source of income for Asarganj residents. The Mainly Income Comes on the month of August (Saawan) as the Bol-Bum Runs behind the Market Many People Earns Lakhs by Selling items by Creating Small Hotel in side of Bol-bum Road.

== Demographics ==
As of 2001, India census, Asarganj had a population of 5,706. Males constitute 53% of the population and females 47%. Asarganj has an average literacy rate of 85%, higher than the national average of 59.5%; with 72% of the males and 70% of females literate. 14% of the population is under 6 years of age.
