= Tarar, Bhagalpur =

Taṛar
- village
- Location within Bihar Location within India
- Coordinates: 25°11′03.3″N 87°10′05.7″E
- Country: India
- State: Bihar
- District: Bhagalpur
- Block: Sonhaula
- Regional Language: Angika

Population (2011)
  - Total: 10,641
- Time zone: UTC+5:30 (IST)
- Postal code: 813205
- village code: 240220
- ISO 3166 code: IN-BR

Taṛar is a village located in Sonhaula subdivision of Bhagalpur district in Bihar, India. It is situated 12km away from sub-district headquarter Sonhaula (tehsildar office) and 25km away from district headquarter Bhagalpur. As per 2009 stats, Tarar is also a village panchayat.

== Geography and data ==
The total geographical area of the village is 371 hectares. Taṛar has a total population of 10,641 peoples, out of which male population is 5,725 while female population is 4,916. Literacy rate of Taṛar village is 48.68% out of which 56.91% males and 39.10% females are literate. There are about 2,006 houses in Taṛar village.

Bhagalpur is the nearest city to Taṛar for all major economic activities, which is approximately 25km away.

== Origins ==
The village is located on a land which is slightly higher in altitude than its surroundings, the slope being sharper to the east, the altitude gradually declining for about 5 or 6 kilometres to reach the Gerua river, a tributary to the Ganges. In the west, chaur land is there, which has a lower altitude than the village has. As Gerua flows to the north (to the Ganges, some 6 kilometres away from Taṛar), the land to the north of the village is relatively a low land. Tarar has never evidenced an incidence of flood. There was a Hindi poem titled "Hey Taṛar" (that appeared in the Taṛar High School Magazine in the 1960s) written by Shri Moti Singh (alias Mathilisharan Nehnidhi), who was a teacher in Taṛar High School, which mentioned that the name "Tarar" came from "Tānd", which means an upland. Since an upland was occupied by the people to inhabit, it was named Tāndar wherefrom the name Taṛar came forth (" ... Tānd bhūmi ābād huyi. Tārar iskā nām pad gayā paribhāsā yun yād huyi". It is believed that Taṛar was settled as a village towards the end of the 18th century, just after the introduction of Zamindari system by the British government.

== Demographics ==
Taṛar has a total population of 10,641.

=== Gender-Wise Population ===
In Taṛar, there are 5,725 males and 4,916 females.

=== Religion-Wise Population ===
Hinduism is the predominant religion in Tarar.

== Language ==
Angika is the native language of Tarar village.

== Parts of Tarar Panchayat ==
- Makarpur
- Dogachchhi
- Tarar (proper)
