= Bhumi Sena =

Private army in Bihar, India, 1982–1990

- Dates active: 1982–1990
- Headquarters: Nalanda district, Bihar
- Active regions: Nalanda, Jahanabad, Patna and Gaya districts
- Wars: Naxalite–Maoist insurgency

Bhumi Sena (transl. Land Army) was a private army which operated in the Patna, Nalanda, Jehanabad, and Gaya districts of Bihar, India in the 1980s, made up of members of the Kurmi caste.

== History ==
Bhumi Sena was formed by Kurmi landowners in 1982, in response to the murders of a number of prominent landlords and political agitation among Dalit labourers by the leftist groups CPI (ML) People's War, CPI (ML) Party Unity, and the Mazdoor Kisan Sangram Samiti (MKSS) . Following its formation, the group gathered resources and arms from Kurmi households, and encouraged Kurmi youths to join. They continued to collect protection money from Kurmi families in the regions they were active in.

Bhumi Sena soon began to combat the leftist groups they opposed, with a series of attacks on Dalits and Maoist sympathisers, including those of the group's own Kurmi caste. Between 1982 and 1985, the group killed 65 people, set 216 houses ablaze, and drove 325 families out of their villages.

The leftist groups responded by killing Bhumi Sena members, and imposing an economic blockade on the Kurmi landlords supporting the group. This strategy found success in 1984, when leftist activists burned the Kurmi landlords' harvest. The landlords agreed to cease support of the group, and paid fines in proportion to their level of support.

Bhumi Sena held increasingly limited influence throughout the latter half of the 1980s, amidst continued attack by leftist groups and a changing political landscape.

== See also ==
- Ranvir Sena
- Kuer Sena
- List of caste based violence in Bihar
