= Caste-related violence in India =

Caste-related violence in India has occurred and continues to occur in various forms.

According to a 2007 report by Human Rights Watch:

inhuman, and degrading treatment of over 165 million people in India has been justified on the basis of caste. Caste is descent-based and hereditary in nature. It is a characteristic determined by one's birth into a particular caste, irrespective of the faith practiced by the individual. Caste denotes a traditional system of rigid social stratification into ranked groups defined by descent and occupation. Caste divisions in India dominate in housing, marriage, employment, and general social interaction-divisions that are reinforced through the practice and threat of social ostracism, economic boycotts, and physical violence.

Quoting about the atrocities committed by the land-holding communities against the 'Untouchables', author Dr. C. P. Yadav states that, "Atrocities are committed on the 'Untouchables' in the villages and small towns and the incidents of such cases are showing an upward trend. Atrocities are committed by the members of land holding Upper castes like Vanniyars and Thevars in Tamil Nadu; by Jats in Delhi NCR; by Reddys and Kammas in Andhra Pradesh; by Jats in Punjab; by Marathas and Kunbis in Maharashtra; by Jats in Haryana; by Bhumihars and Rajputs in Bihar; by Jats, Gujars, Ahir and Rajputs in Eastern Uttar Pradesh in a 2 part of Uttar Pradesh, by Jats and Gujars in Western Uttar Pradesh; by Ahir and Rajputs in Eastern Uttar Pradesh; by Jats in Rajasthan.

Scholars and human rights organizations have documented that a disproportionate share of caste-based violence is directed toward Dalit women, who face intersecting discrimination based on caste and gender. Reports note that Dalit women experience systemic stigma from birth, affecting multiple aspects of life including political participation, access to justice, and household labor. Human Rights Watch has further documented cases in which sexual violence against Dalit women has been used as a means of social control and intimidation by dominant caste groups. The 2020 Hathras gang rape and murder of a 19-year-old Dalit woman in Uttar Pradesh drew national and international attention to the persistence of such violence. According to India’s National Crime Records Bureau, crimes against Dalit women increased significantly in several states during the late 2010s, including a reported rise in Uttar Pradesh between 2016 and 2019.

== 20th century ==
Year	Event	Location	Description
1948	Anti-Brahmin riots	Maharashtra	After assassination of Mahatma Gandhi by Nathuram Godse who was a Chitpavan Brahmin, Marathi Brahmins were targeted by people from the Maratha caste. Later, Jains and Lingayats also attacked innocent Brahmins. Several incidents of burning of homes were reported.
1957	Ramnad riots	Tamil Nadu	The Ramnad riots or the Mudukulathur riots were a series of violent clashes that occurred between July and September 1957 in the Ramnad district and in southern Tamil Nadu, India. The violence was between Thevars supporting the Forward Bloc, and pro-Congress Dalit Pallars, and was triggered by a by-election held in the aftermath of the Madras Legislative Assembly elections of earlier that year. 42 Dalits were killed during the riots.
1968	Kilvenmani massacre	Tamil Nadu	Massacre on 25 December 1968 in which a group of 44 Dalit village labourers who were on strike for higher wages were murdered by a gang, sent by their landlords.
1978	Villupuram violence	Tamil Nadu	The 1978 Villupuram atrocity was an incident of caste based violence which happened in July 1978 in Villupuram, Tamil Nadu. The violence resulted in 12 Dalits being killed and more than 100 Dalit houses burned down in Periyaparaichery, a Dalit settlement. The violence was caused when a group of Dalits allegedly attacked a dominant caste man after he allegedly molested a Dalit women. Later, dominant caste people attacked the settlement with rocket fireworks and indulged in arson and assault. The Dalits also retaliated by setting fire to several dominant caste houses.
1980	Kafalta massacre	Uttar Pradesh (now Uttarakhand)	The massacre happened on 9 May 1980 in village of Kafalta in Almora, Uttarakhand (then part of Uttar Pradesh) where 14 Dalits from Shilpkar community were killed, after Dalit groom refused to dismount of a horse in his Baraat passing through an upper-caste neighbourhood. 6 of them were burnt alive while hiding in a nearby house and rest were hunted down while running to field saving their lives. In 1997, 16 accused were sentenced to life imprisonment.
1981	Behmai massacre	Uttar Pradesh	Phoolan Devi (1963 – 2001) was an Indian dacoit (bandit), who later became politician. Born into a traditional Mallaah (boatman class) family, she was kidnapped by a gang of dacoits. The Gujjar leader of the gang tried to rape her, but she was protected by the deputy leader Vikram, who belonged to her caste. Later, an upper-caste Thakur friend of Vikram killed him, abducted Phoolan, and locked her up in the Behmai village. Phoolan was raped in the village by Thakur men, until she managed to escape after three weeks.
1981	Dehuli massacre	Dehuli, Firozabad, Uttar Pradesh	This massacre happened on 18 November 1981 when 17 men from the Thakur caste, disguised in police uniforms, murdered at least 24 Dalits from the Jatav community. In March 2025, three of the 17 men, Kaptaan Singh, Ramsevak, and Rampal Singh were sentenced to death.
1985	Karamchedu massacre	Karamchedu, Andhra Pradesh	This massacre occurred on 17 July 1985, when madiga-caste dalits were killed by the Kamma caste people in 1985. Many people lost their lives in the incident.
1987	Dalelchak-Bhagaura Massacre	Bihar	The killing of 52 upper caste members particularly from Rajput community was organised by a Maoist Communist Centre, a far-left militia led by Yadavs and composed mostly of members of lower (scheduled) castes. Ranvir Sena took revenge of these killings by killing people of scheduled caste members.
1987	Neerukonda massacre	Andhra Pradesh	The Neerukonda Massacre happened in Andhra Pradesh on July 15, 1987, in Neerukonda village, inside the Guntur district of India's Andhra Pradesh state. An angry mob composed of members of the Kamma caste began attacking Dalit Malas after some of them held a wedding ceremony inside the town's upper-class areas. The rioters killed five people which included four Malas. Among those people killed was a 60-year old Mala elder. Many Malas fled to nearby Mangalagiri.
1991	Tsundur massacre	Andhra Pradesh, Tsundur	The village became infamous for the killing of 8 dalits on the 6 August 1991, when a mob of over 300 people, composed of mainly Reddys and Telagas, chased down the victims along the bund of an irrigation canal. This happened after Dalits were socially boycotted by the Reddy landowners of the village. The social boycott happened because a young graduate Dalit youth was beaten as his feet had unintentionally touched a Reddy woman near a cinema hall and the Dalits of the village supported him. As a result, e. In the trial which was concluded, 21 people were sentenced to life imprisonment and 35 others to a year of rigorous imprisonment and a penalty of Rs. 2,000 each, on the 31 July 2007, by special judge established for the purpose under the Scheduled Caste and Scheduled Tribe (Prevention of Atrocities) Act.
1990s	Violence by Ranvir Sena	Bihar	Ranvir Sena is a militia group based in Bihar. The group is based amongst the higher-caste landlords, and carries out actions against the outlawed naxals in rural areas. It has committed violent acts against Dalits and other members of the scheduled caste community in an effort to prevent their land from going to them.
1992	Bara massacre	Bihar	On the midnight of 12–13 February 1992, the Maoist Communist Centre of India (MCC), now the Communist Party of India (Maoist), brutally killed 35 members of the Bhumihar caste at Bara Village near Gaya District of Bihar. The MCC's armed group brought the 35 men of Bara village to the bank of a nearby canal, tied their hands and slit their throats.As many as 36 people were accused of the crime, but charges were framed against only 13. The police failed to arrest the others, who had defied their summons.
1996	Bathani Tola massacre	Bihar	21 Dalits were killed by the Ranvir Sena in Bathani Tola, Bhojpur in Bihar on 11 July 1996. Among the dead were 11 women, six children and three infants. Ranvir Sena mob killed women and children in particular with the intention of deterring any future resistance which they foresaw.
1994	Chhotan Shukla murder case	Bihar	Chhotan Shukla was a gangster of the Bhumihar community known for his tussle with Brij Bihari Prasad, a government minister who hailed from the Bania caste. During his return from an election campaign he was murdered allegedly by men operating on behalf of Prasad. In retribution, Prasad was also shot dead. Anand Mohan Singh, who was a leader of the upper-caste Rajputs, and his close companion Munna Shukla, the brother of Chhotan and himself a Bhumihar leader, were tried and given life terms in prison. The District Magistrate of Gopalganj, G. Krishnaiah, was also murdered by upper castes as he symbolised the growing power of backwards communities.
1997	Melavalavu massacre	Tamil Nadu, Madurai district	In the village of Melavalavu, in Tamil Nadu's Madurai district, following the election of a Dalit to the village council presidency, members of caste Hindus (Kallar) group murdered of six Dalits in June 1996. Melur panchayat, which was a general constituency, was declared a reserved constituency in 1996. This had caused resentment between Scheduled Caste people and Kallar (Ambalakarar) community. In the 1996 panchayat elections, Murugesan was elected president. In June 1996, a group of persons attacked Murugesan, vice-president Mookan and others with deadly weapons, resulting in the death of six persons and injuries to many others. A total of 40 persons were cited as accused in the case. The trial court convicted Alagarsamy and 16 others and sentenced them to undergo life imprisonment. On appeal, the High Court by its judgment dated April 19, 2006, confirmed the trial court's order. Alagarsamy and others filed appeals against this judgment.
1997	Laxmanpur Bathe massacre	Bihar	On 1 December 1997, Ranvir Sena gunned down 58 Dalits at Laxmanpur Bathe, Jehanabad, in retaliation for the Bara massacre in Gaya where 37 upper castes were killed. In particular, a specific Bhumihar community was targeted in retaliation for their opposition towards handing out their land for land reform. Charges were framed in the Laxmanpur-Bathe case on 23 December 2008 against 46 Ranvir Sena members for killing Dalits, including 27 women and 10 children men. On 7 April 2010, the trial court at Patna convicted all 26 accused. 16 were sentenced to death and the other 10 were each give life imprisonment and fines of Rs. 50,000. Around 91 of 152 witnesses in the case had deposed before the court. On 9 October 2013, the Patna High Court suspended the conviction of all 26 accused, saying the prosecution had produced no evidence to guarantee any punishment at all.
1997	Ramabai killings	Mumbai	On 11 July 1997, a statue of B.R. Ambedkar in the Dalit colony of Ramabai was desecrated by unknown individuals. An initially peaceful protest was fired on by the police, killing ten people, including a bystander who had not been involved in the protests. Later in the day, 26 people were injured when the police carried out a lathi charge against the protesters. Commentators suggested that the arbitrarily violent response from the police had been the result of caste based prejudice, as the leader of the team stood accused in multiple cases involving caste-based discrimination.
1999	Senari Massacre	Bihar	The Maoists extremist centre dominated by Yadav and Dusadh slaughtered 34 Bhumihar in Senari village, Jehanabad district.

== 21st century ==
Year	Event	Location	Description
2000	Afsar massacre	Bihar	This incident was a consequence of rivalry for domination between upper-caste Bhumihars and backward-caste Kurmis. The killing of 12 Bhumihars sparked anger among Bhumihar youths. The perpetrators of the incident were members of the Ashok Mahto gang, formed by a Koeri militant who was also responsible for atrocities against upper castes including murder of sitting member of parliament Rajo Singh from Bihar.
2000	Kambalapalli incident	Karnataka	On 11 March 2000, seven Dalits were locked in a house and burnt alive by an upper-caste Reddy mob in Kambalapalli, Kolar district of Karnataka state. The Civil Rights Enforcement (CRE) Cell investigation revealed deep-rooted animosity between the Dalits and the upper-castes as the reason for the violence. The witnesses in the case, many of whom had narrowly escaped with their lives, had turned hostile during the trial in a lower court, resulting in a similar acquittal in 2006. Immediately after that verdict was delivered, many of the witnesses told the media that they backtracked because of threats from upper-caste groups. A subsequent plea for a retrial was rejected by the High Court. A division bench of Karnataka High Court acquitted all 46 accused in August 2014. The bench headed by Justice Mohan Shantanagoudar held that a conviction would be "pre-judicial" to the interest of the accused given that 14 years had passed since the incident and all the 22 eyewitnesses had since turned hostile. The court also observed that the investigating police officer and some of the eyewitnesses were not cross-examined properly.
2000	Miapur massacre	Bihar	On 17 June 2000, several black-clad gunmen from the Ranvir Sena attacked the village of Miapur, killing at least 34 people, including six children, mainly from the Yadav caste.
2004	Chakwai incident	Bihar	On 3 July 2004, several armed attackers, suspected from the Akhilesh Singh gang of the Bhumihar caste, opened fire on villagers in Chakwai, killing at least ten lower caste people, including two members of the Ashok Mahto gang.
2005	Jahanabad prison raid	Bihar	In 2005, Jahanabad, an area where Bhumihars are numerous, saw massive attacks and cordoning-off with the whole town under control of Maoists for more than two hours. About 200 armed men belonging to low caste agricultural labourers, led by poor peasants of castes such as the Koeri and Teli, attacked the district prison. They killed members of Ranvir Sena who were incarcerated there and returned with their comrades including Ajay Kanu, a Teli by caste.
2006	Khairlanji massacre	Maharashtra	On September 29, 2006, four members of the Bhotmange family belonging to the Mahar community were killed by a mob of 40 people belonging to the Maratha Kunbi caste. The incident happened in Kherlanji, a small village in Bhandara district of Maharashtra. The Mahars are Dalit, while the Kunbi are classified as an Other Backward Class by the Indian government. The Bhotmanges were stripped naked and paraded to the village square by a mob of 40 people. The sons were ordered to rape their mother and sister, and when they refused, their genitals were mutilated before they were murdered. An initial call to the police was ignored, and a search for the bodies was deliberately delayed 2 days. The bodies were found in a canal, and due to the length of time the bodies were in the water, much of the physical evidence was contaminated or destroyed. The subsequent police and political inaction led to protests from Dalits. After allegations of a cover-up, the case was transferred to the Central Bureau of Investigation (CBI).
2006	2006 Dalit protests	Maharashtra	In November–December 2006, the vandalism of an Ambedkar statue in Kanpur, Uttar Pradesh, triggered violent protests by Dalits in Maharashtra. Several people remarked that the protests were fueled by the Khairlanji massacre. During the violent protests, the Dalit protestors set 3 trains on fire, damaged over 100 buses, and clashed with police At least 4 deaths and many more injuries were reported.
2008	Gurjar agitation in Rajasthan	Rajasthan	To get 5 percent reservation in government service, the andolan took place and cause 72 deaths of Gurjars.
2009	Gangrape of Suman Balai	Rajasthan	Three Rajput men gangraped Suman Balai, a student, from their village after forcibly taking her to a dry well. They were convicted and sentenced to 10 years in prison. However, the Rajputs of the village harassed the Dalit woman for filing the complaint against their fellow Rajputs. This harassment ultimately resulted in her suicide.
2011	Mirchpur Dalit killings incident	Haryana	In 2010, at Mirchpur, a Valmiki colony of Dalits, a 2 year old dog allegedly barked at some 10 to 15 boys from the Jat community who rode on motorcycles in front of the house of Jai Prakash. One of the Jat boys, Rajinder Pali, hurled a brick at the dog, causing a young Dalit to object. A physical fight ensued between them and the Jat boys threatened dire consequences. Later, two Dalits elders named Veer Bhan and Karan Singh apologised to Jat elders but were beaten by them. On 21 April 2010, the Dalits met away from Mirchpur by arrangement with the police to achieve a compromise. In their absence, 300 to 400 Jat men and mens went to Mirchpur, ransacked houses for jewels, cash and clothes, and then set the homes ablaze with thirteen Dalit mens and children's inside. This led to death by burning of 70-year-old Tara Chand and his 48-year-old son Pradeep Kumar, 41-year-old son Sandeep Kumar and 18-year-old physically challenged grandson Sumesh Singh and 17-year-old to 28-year-old 3 grandsons bunty, Guddu and Sonu. After this incident, 200 Dalit families left the village fearing for their safety. Only 50 families remained with a group of 75 CRPF personnel deployed in the village. Police named 103 people in the charge sheet out of which 5 were juveniles.
2012	Dharmapuri violence	Tamil Nadu	In December 2012 approximately 268 dwellings — huts, tiled-roof and one or two-room concrete houses — of Dalits of the Adi Dravida community near Naikkankottai in Dharmapuri district of western Tamil Nadu were torched by the higher-caste Vanniyar. The victims have alleged that ‘systematic destruction’ of their properties and livelihood resources has taken place. In December 2012, in case of caste violence, two men named Akbar Ali and Mustafa Ansari were beaten by Muslims.
2013	2013 Ahmednagar murders	Maharashtra, Ahmednagar	On 1 January 2013, three Dalit men were killed in an honor killing by a group of upper-caste mob after one of the victims fell in love with a girl from an upper caste farmer. In January 2018, all six men involved with the deaths were sentenced to death by hanging.
2013	Marakkanam violence	Tamil Nadu	In April 2013, violence broke out between the villagers along East Coast Road near Marakkanam and those travelling to Vanniyar dominant caste gathering at Mamallapuram. A mob indulged in setting fire to houses, 4 buses of TNSTC and PRTC. 3 people were injured in police firing. Traffic was closed in ECR for a day.
2015	Dalit violence in Dangawas	Rajasthan, Nagaur district	On Thursday, May 14, 2015, clashes between Jats and Dalits in Dangawas village of Rajasthan's Nagaur district left 4 Dalits Dead and 13 injured.
2016	Violence following the suicide of Rohith Vemula	Hyderabad	The suicide of Rohith Vemula, of Central University of Hyderabad, on 18 January 2016 sparked protests and outrage from across India and gained widespread media attention as an alleged case of discrimination against Dalits and backward classes in India in which elite educational institutions have been purportedly seen as an enduring vestige of caste-based discrimination against students belonging to "backward classes".
2016	Ariyalur gang rape case	Tamil Nadu	In December 2016, a Hindu Munnani Union Secretary and three of his accomplices gang-raped, and murdered a 17-year-old minor Dailt girl in Keezhamaligai village, Ariyalur district. The police revealed that the Hindu Munnani functionary was irritated over the lower-caste dalit girl who insisted to marry her after she got pregnant with him. The men also pulled out the fetus from her womb. Later, her body was found in decomposed state in a well with her hands tied, stripped of all jewelry and clothes.
2017	Anandpal Singh murder case	Rajasthan	The murder case of Anandpal Singh was a culmination of various events which were result of battle for dominance between Jats and Rajput of Rajasthan. It was claimed by supporters of Singh that his encounter was a conspiracy. The allegations were also made that Chief Minister Vasundhara Raje, a maratha and Home Minister Gulab Chand Kataria, a Jats, both were involved though charges were never proved.
2017	Saharanpur violence	Uttar Pradesh	Violence broke out between Thakurs and dalits during the procession of Rajput warrior-king Maharana Pratap over the loud music. In the violence one man was killed, 16 were injured, and 25 Dalit houses were burned. The incident was connected to MP Raghav Lakhanpal, BJP member from Saharanpur.
2018	Bhima Koregaon violence	Maharashtra, Pune	This event was an attack on visitors during an annual celebratory gathering at Bhima Koregaon to mark the 200th anniversary of the Battle of Bhima Koregaon victory. Later, a think tank called Forum for Integrated National Security(FINS), mainly consisting of retired army officers, released a report on the Bhima Koregaon riots. The report absolved the Hindu leaders Milind Ekbote and Sambhaji Bhide from direct involvement. Instead, it blamed the Maoists (ultra left-wing organisations) for instigating the Dalit activists. It also blamed the Maharashtra Police for "apathy" and overlooking evidence.
2018	April caste protests in India	India	In early April 2018, lakhs of people belonging to Scheduled Castes and Scheduled Tribes (SC/ST) protested across India against an order of the Supreme Court on the Atrocities Act. In subsequent violence, 14 people died and hundreds were injured.
2019	Murder of Jitendra	Uttarakhand	On 26 April 2019, a 21-year-old Dalit named Jitendra from Kot, Uttarkhand, was beaten by a group of upper-caste men, allegedly for sitting and eating in their presence at a wedding. He died nine days later from his injuries.
2019	Suicide of Payal Tadvi	Maharashtra, Mumbai	On 22 May 2019, Dr. Payal Tadvi, a 26-year-old Schedule-Tribe Muslim gynaecologist, died by suicide in Mumbai. For months leading up to her death, she had told her family that she was subjected to ragging by three "upper" caste women doctors; however, the accused denied of having any knowledge of Tadvi's tribal background. They allegedly went to the toilet and then wiped their feet on her bed, called her casteist slurs, made fun of her for being a tribal on WhatsApp groups and threatened to not allow her to enter operation theatres or perform deliveries. A few hours before she took her life, she had reportedly told her mother, once again, about this harassment.
2020	Hathras gang rape & murder	Uttar Pradesh, Hathras district	In September 2020, a dalit girl in Hathras district of Uttar Pradesh was allegedly murdered by 4 men from Thakur caste. According to victim's family, the girl was gang raped by Thakurs of the Village and in order to eliminate the evidences her backbone was broken and the tongue was cut by the perpetrators. The girl has confessed the same on a video shot inside the Hospital. The Police secretly burned her dead body at midnight without conducting any Post Mortem Test.
2022	Murder of Indra Meghwal	Jalore district, Rajasthan	A nine year old Dalit boy, named Indra Meghwal, was assaulted by a teacher after touching a pot of drinking water meant only for upper castes, which led to his death after 24 days.

== See also ==
- List of caste based violence in Bihar
- Communalism (South Asia)
- History of India
- Human rights in India
- Partition of India
- Religion in India
- Freedom of religion in India
- Religious harmony in India
- Human rights in India
- Religious violence in India
  - 1984 anti-Sikh riots
  - Violence against Christians in India
  - Violence against Muslims in India
- Terrorism in India
- Crime in India
- Caste system in India
- Scheduled Castes and Scheduled Tribes
- Caste discrimination in the United States
