= Eka, Firozabad =

Town in Uttar Pradesh, India

Eka
- Town
- Location in Uttar Pradesh, India
- Country: India
- State: Uttar Pradesh
- District: Firozabad
- Tehsil: Jasrana

Area
  - Total: 33.718 km^{2} (13.019 sq mi)

Population (2011)
  - Total: 24,368
  - Density: 722.70/km^{2} (1,871.8/sq mi)
- Time zone: UTC+5:30 (IST)

Eka is a town in Jasrana Tehsil, pincode 283152 Firozabad district, Uttar Pradesh, India. As of 2011, it had a population of 24,368, in 3,972 households.

The town was formerly part of Mainpuri district but upon establishment of the new district of Firozabad on 5 February 1989 the town was constituted under Firozabad. Eka is located on a link road that connects National Highway 2 NH2 from Shikohabad to National Highway 91 NH91 from Etah. The nearest railway station is Shikohabad (35 km) and the nearest international airport is New Delhi (approximately 280 km). Agra, home of the Taj Mahal, is 80 km from Eka.

== Archaeology ==
During an exploration of what was then Mainpuri district in the late 1970s, the archaeologist L. M. Wahal discovered an archaeological site at Eka where there were artifacts attributed to the Painted Grey Ware (c. 1200-600 BCE) and Northern Black Polished Ware (c. 700-200 BCE) cultures.

== Demographics ==
As of 2011, Eka had a population of 24,368, in 3,972 households. This population was 53.0% male (12,927) and 47.0% female (11,441). The 0–6 age group numbered 3,785 (1,963 male and 1,822 female), making up 15.5% of the total population. 4,593 residents were members of Scheduled Castes, or 18.8% of the total.

== Infrastructure ==
As of 2011, Eka had 2 primary schools, 4 secondary schools, and 1 community health centre. Drinking water was provided by hand pump and tube well/bore well; there were no public toilets. The village had a sub post office but no public library; there was at least some access to electricity for all purposes. Streets were made of both kachcha and pakka materials.

== List of villages in Eka block ==
The following 96 villages are counted as part of Eka CD block:

1. Aapur
2. Ajampursiloota
3. Akhaitpur
4. Alampur Pilakhtar
5. Alipurmohainipur
6. Bahlolpur
7. Bhadana
8. Bhadau
9. Bhagner
10. Bhikanpurpadam
11. Chidraiprathvi Singh
12. Deva
13. Dharampur
14. Dundi
15. Eka (block headquarters)
16. Ekhu
17. Emapalia
18. Farida Gokul
19. Farida Pedat
20. Fatehpurpat
21. Fathapur Khas
22. Gadanpur
23. Gaheri
24. Garhi
25. Ginauli
26. Gohna
27. Gopalpur
28. Hathooli Jaisinghpur
29. Himmatpur
30. Jahanpur
31. Jaitpur
32. Kachhvai
33. Kadipur
34. Katana
35. Keelai
36. Khadit
37. Kheri Ema
38. Kodra
39. Kutilabatolar
40. Lakhijangal
41. Lalgarhi
42. Machan
43. Madhipur
44. Milavali
45. Milik
46. Morcha
47. Muhbbatpur
48. Mustafabad
49. Nagla Achall
50. Nagla Ajit
51. Nagla Bavan
52. Nagla Bhhiki
53. Nagla Deva
54. Nagla Dhani
55. Nagla Gave
56. Nagla Gigna
57. Nagla Gokul
58. Nagla Gosbha
59. Nagla Jagannath
60. Nagla Mahadeva
61. Nagla Milik
62. Nagla Nojar
63. Nagla Panchha
64. Nagla Sagar
65. Nagla Sandula
66. Nagla Singh
67. Nagla Sukhi
68. Nagria
69. Namandariyab Singh
70. Namangjadharsingh
71. Navalpur
72. Ninavli
73. Pairhat
74. Palia Kalan
75. Palia Khurd
76. Parham
77. Patara
78. Patti
79. Pilakhtarfateh
80. Pilakhtarjait
81. Rampur
82. Rudrapur
83. Ruhasi
84. Singhpur
85. Sonai
86. Sunav
87. Suraya
88. Tanda
89. Thati
90. Throoa
91. Udesar Gajadhar Singh
92. Udesar Rudra Singh
93. Usdhar Sarnam Singh
94. Ulayatpur
95. Yagmurpurpavrai
