= Karamchedu massacre =

1985 massacre in Andhra Pradesh, India

Karamchedu Massacre
- Part of Caste-related violence in India
- Location: Karamchedu, Andhra Pradesh, India
- Date: 17 July 1985
- Attack type: Caste-based violence
- Deaths: 6
- Injuries: Several
- Victim: Dalit Madigas
- Perpetrator: Kamma caste landlords
- Motive: Caste-based dominance

Karamchedu massacre refers to an incident that occurred in Karamchedu, Bapatla district of Andhra Pradesh on 17 July 1985, where brutality by Kamma landlords against Madigas (Dalits) resulted in the killing of six Madigas and grievous injuries to many others. Three Madiga women were raped. Hundreds of Madigas in the village were displaced from their home and killed after their houses were burnt and looted.

Kammas, who held economic power and political influence, were the dominant caste in the village, while the Dalit villagers, who mostly worked as agricultural labourers under the Kamma landlords for meagre wages, were oppressed socially and economically. The provocation for the violence came from a trivial incident in which a Madiga boy objected to a Kamma boy soiling the water tank where Dalits drew their drinking water. Scholars have reported that the massacre happened because the Kammas wanted to "teach a lesson" to the Madigas since Kammas felt that their caste-supremacy was challenged by Dalits who were perceived as "untouchables" and "nobodies".

The final verdict was delivered 23 years after the violence took place, in which the Supreme Court of India sentenced a man to life imprisonment and 30 others to three years of imprisonment. The massacre is said to have highlighted the discriminatory and violent tendencies of caste hierarchies that are prevalent in the modern Indian society. It also generated widespread outrage from Dalit activists of the state and led to the formation of Andhra Pradesh Dalit Mahasabha which drew inspiration from Ambedkar's ideals and stood for Dalit rights, and fought against untouchability and exclusion.

== Background ==
During the 1980s, the village of Karamchedu had a population of around 13,600 of which 6,000 belonged to the Kamma caste. About 2,000 villagers belonged to the Scheduled Castes (Dalits), of which 1,100 were Madigas and 900 were Malas. The village had a cultivable land of around 9,000 acres, most of which was owned by the Kamma landlords. They also owned another 2,000 acres in the neighboring villages. Due to the fertile soil and good irrigation facilities developed since the British rule in the previous century (through Krishna river canals) and also during the post-independence era (through Nagarjuna Sagar canals), the Kamma people in the village were quite prosperous. They cultivated paddy along with commercial crops like tobacco, earning an estimated annual household income of ₹65,000. Dalits, on the other hand, comprised much of the agricultural labour. The annual income of a paleru (agricultural labourer) was just ₹2000. The daily wages paid to male and female agricultural workers (who worked for 16 hours a day) was ₹10-12 and ₹6-8 respectively, which was quite lower than the minimum wage rates that were legally prescribed for that region. The Kamma landlords also used force to ensure loyalty from Dalit labourers. If the labourers were absent from work for some reason, it was reported that the landlords of the village would personally to go to their houses to beat them up and sometimes the landlords would further punish the workers by suspending them from work for up to nine months.

In the 1960s, communist politics dominated the village with significant participation from Kamma peasantry. But once their community attained 'upward mobility' in land-ownership and economic wealth, they found it to be against their material interests to continue the left politics. So the Kammas of the region either left the communist party, or diluted the local struggle by remaining in the party. After the formation of Telugu Desam Party (TDP) in Andhra Pradesh, the Kammas of the village extended their support to it. A wealthy Kamma landlord of the village, Daggubati Chenchu Ramaiah, who also happens to be one of the main accused in the Karamchedu massacre, had strong connections with the TDP's founder N. T. Rama Rao (NTR). His son, Daggubati Venkateswara Rao, was married to NTR's daughter. Daggubati Venkateswara Rao contested as MLA in the region and won with the TDP party ticket in 1983. Scholar Dag-Erik Berg states that the rise of TDP and the connections the local Kamma landlords had with the political leadership "emboldened" them to intensify their caste-oppression against Dalits.

In the absence of left politics, Dalits of the village supported the traditional Congress party. Kammas saw this resistance of Dalits, particularly Madigas, voting against the TDP as a sign of revolt, since their "economic bondage" did not translate into "political loyalty". Scholar K Srinivasulu writes that it caused "sufficient injury" to the collective pride of the dominant Kamma caste, "which only waited for a pretext for retaliation".

== Violence ==
On 16 July 1985, a Kamma boy was washing his buffalo near a water tank where Dalits drew their drinking water, letting out the soiled water into the tank. A Madiga boy objected to this, angering the Kamma boy who reacted violently by beating the farmer with his cattle whip. A Madiga girl who came to fetch water was also whipped and kicked for protesting against the beating. She then retaliated with her vessel, and an elderly Dalit intervened and tried to calm the situation. The Kamma boy left the scene after issuing a warning.

This episode provoked the Kammas to plan an organised attack against the Madigas of the village to 'teach them a lesson'. To catch the Madigas by surprise, they sent a team for compromise which was accepted by a section of Madigas. And on the morning of 17 July, hundreds of Kammas armed with axes, spears and clubs launched an unanticipated attack on the residents of Madiga wada (settlement), damaging the entire colony, not even sparing pregnant women and mothers with small children. They tortured and chased the Dalits, and burnt their houses. Srinivasulu notes:

‘What followed was an attack, well planned and executed, that went on for hours in which the Madigas regardless of age and sex were chased from their hovels, the Kammas used all likely forms of transport, scooters, tractors, etc., and the Madigas ran helter-skelter for their lives in all directions. The more likely place to hide was the gaddi vamulu (fodder heaps) in the fields. Even there they were not spared. The gory details of this are amply recorded by the various fact-finding committees and in the sympathetic accounts reported in the press. But what is important to note is the fact that finally this left six dalits murdered, three dalit women raped and many more wounded, some of them very seriously and the huts burnt, whatever little was with them looted.’ (Fact Finding Team, 1985)

The police in Karamchedu did not protect the victims, and Dalits fled the village in large numbers and arrived in the neighboring town of Chirala which was about 8 kilometres away, where many of them were hospitalized, following which some of them died of injuries. The local police of Chirala initially hit and arrested some Dalits who reached the town in panic, instead of helping them. Later the local Dalit activists and leaders accompanied the victims who sought shelter in a church in the town, and organised a refugee camp to help them. The camp consisted of about 500 Dalits, who never returned to Karamchedu, preferring to settle in Chirala.

== Aftermath and convictions ==
The Karamchedu incident evoked widespread outrage and protests by Dalit activists in the state. In response to the massacre, leaders like Bojja Tharakam and Katti Padma Rao decided to establish an 'independent Dalit movement' in the state and formed the Andhra Pradesh Dalit Mahasabha, breaking away from the then popular class discourse and focusing specifically on the issues of caste and untouchability. Katti Padma Rao lived in Chirala at the time when Karamchedu victims came to the town and he witnessed the situation in the refugee camp and the local hospital. This provided the ideological impetus for the formation of Dalit Mahasabha. The organisation sought to mobilize and organize Dalits to fight against oppression and stand for Dalit assertion, rights and justice. The Dalit Mahasabha movement identified itself with B. R. Ambedkar's ideologies and employed them as its principal strategy.

A Dalit woman, who was a principal witness to the massacre, was murdered in August 1987. Following the efforts of Dalit Mahasabha, the state government announced some aid for the victims. Several court cases were fought and the Ongole district court initially sentenced 159 people to life imprisonment, which was later struck down by the Andhra Pradesh High Court due to benefit of doubt. The final verdict was delivered by the Supreme Court in 2008 (10 years after the case was filed), sentencing the main accused to life imprisonment and 30 others to three years of imprisonment.

Avenging the Karamchedu massacre, the People's War Group murdered Daggubati Chenchu Ramaiah who was a key accused in the violence, though the Dalit Mahasabha opposed such violent moves.

== Analysis ==
Karamchedu massacre was seen as a significant incident which broke the myth that caste-discrimination was a "thing of the past". Dag-Erik Berg writes that it depicted the intensification of caste in the modern agrarian economy, emphasizing the role of "status" and "honor" in the system of stratification, the significance of economic and political power, and the deep rooted notions of untouchability that could lead to brutality in the Indian society.

Berg refers to M. N. Srinivas's conception of 'dominant caste' for explaining the caste hierarchies in the modern society. After a significant shift in landownership in the post colonial era from Brahmin to non-Brahmin castes (like Reddys, Kammas and Kapus), Kammas, who already constituted an affluent and politically powerful group before the twentieth century and were classified as "Shudras" in the traditional Varna system, gained increased social dominance through their economic and political power. Berg says that their claim to caste superiority was dependent on relation to Dalits who were 'excluded' in the traditional ritual classification in which they are treated as "untouchables". M. N. Srinivas says that "any caste that achieved political power at the local level could advance a claim to be Kshatriyas". Accordingly, in this case, the local Kamma historians engaged in providing 'evidence' to claim their Kshatriya status, which coincided with the early 1900s colonial census that categorized people. However, since this ritual superiority of Kammas was not entirely self-evident and was open to dispute, Berg says, they had to enforce it through violence. "Their everyday dominance involved material exploitation and the use of force." The essential difference between "touchables" and "untouchables" supposedly justifies this violence since the 'untouchables' are seen as "nobodies". Berg notes that Dalit expressions of self-assertion and egalitarianism further intensify this conflict.

"Madiga dogs! Have you learnt your lesson well for having opposed the Kammas?" — Kamma landlords while attacking the Dalit villagers of Karamchedu on 17 July 1985

So, the massacre in Karamchedu is seen as the result of Dalits trying to 'correct' the unfair behavior of Kammas. Both Berg and K Srinivasulu state that Kammas wanted to 'teach a lesson' to the Dalits since their superiority was challenged.

Karamchedu incident also posed an intellectual challenge to the classic Marxist perspective which saw caste-oppression as a mere consequence of class struggle between the capitalist farmers and agricultural workers. Although the class dimension is closely related to the caste-oppression, the Dalit movement in the state post-Karamchedu emphasized the need to address the issue of caste in its specificity since it plays a predominant role in the underlying social conflict. The Dalit movement also made Ambedkar a powerful symbol for emancipation. Following his ideas of Annihilation of Caste, Dalit leaders and activists fought against untouchability and exclusion, and strove for self-assertion, dignity and legal protection from the state.

== See also ==
- Tsundur massacre
- Neerukonda massacre
- List of Scheduled Castes in Andhra Pradesh & Telangana

== Bibliography ==
- Berg, Dag-Erik (2020). "The Karamchedu Killings and the Struggle to Uncover Untouchability, in Dynamics of Caste and Law: Dalits, Oppression and Constitutional Democracy in India" (Cambridge University Press – South Asia in the Social Sciences): 103–126. doi:10.1017/9781108779616.005. S2CID 236809002.
- Srinivasulu, K. (2002). Caste, Class and Social Articulation in Andhra Pradesh, India: Mapping Differential Regional Trajectories. Overseas Development Institute. ISBN 978-0-85003-612-1. Available online
- Berg, Dag-Erik (2014). "Karamchedu and the Dalit subject in Andhra Pradesh". Contributions to Indian Sociology. 48 (3): 383–408. doi:10.1177/0069966714540242. S2CID 143769089.
