= Neerukonda massacre =

1987 caste-based massacre in India

Neerukonda Massacre
- Part of Caste-related violence in India
- Location: Neerukonda village, Guntur district, Andhra Pradesh, India
- Date: 15 July 1987
- Attack type: Caste-based violence
- Deaths: 5
- Injuries: Unknown
- Victims: Dalit Malas, Yadav
- Perpetrator: Kamma caste members
- Motive: Caste-based discrimination

The Neerukonda Massacre happened in Andhra Pradesh on July 15, 1987, in Neerukonda village, inside the Guntur district of India's Andhra Pradesh state. An angry mob composed of members of the Kamma caste began attacking Dalit Malas after some of them held a wedding ceremony inside the town's upper-caste areas. The rioters killed five people, one a Yadav and the remaining four Malas. Among those people killed was a 60-year old Mala elder. Many Malas fled to nearby Mangalagiri.

The riots, along with the Karamchedu and Tsundur massacres, have been described as having helped shape the perception of the caste system in Indian society.

== See also ==
- Tsundur massacre
- Karamchedu massacre
- List of Scheduled Castes in Andhra Pradesh & Telangana
