= Bojja Tharakam =

Indian poet and social activist

- Born: 27 June 1939; Kandikuppa village of East Godavari district, India
- Died: 16 September 2016 (aged 77); Hyderabad, India
- Political party: Schedule caste student federation, President Republican Party of India
- Spouse: Vijaya Bharati
- Children: Dr.Bojja Mahita, Rahul Bojja (IAS)

Bojja Tharakam (27 June 1939 – 16 September 2016) was an Indian poet, writer, social and political activist and a human rights advocate. Tharakam was a lawyer in the Andhra Pradesh State High Court, fighting against the problems that Dalits have had to confront.

== Biography ==
=== Early age ===
Bojja Tarakam was born in Kandikuppa village of East Godavari district to his parents Appalaswamy and Mavullamma. His father, Bojja Appalaswamy, was one of the SCF leaders in coastal Andhra and was elected twice to the legislative Assembly from Amalapuram constituency in East Godavari district, in 1951 and 1955.

== Cases ==
=== Chundur Massacre/Tsunduru massacre (1991) ===
He was senior public prosecutor Tsunduru massacre case in the Andhra Pradesh High Court. During an interview with Dalit Camera he said that the judgment in the Tsundur case was biased, illogical and casteist to protect their Reddy caste people. The reasoning given by the high court is contrary to all principles of criminal jurisprudence and appreciation of evidence. The trial court which gave the first judgment had elaborately discussed the evidence, the entire evidence, and come to a conclusion which is unassailable. But unfortunately the high court, throwing all the norms and canons of justice to the winds, gave a very unscientific reasoning, which is unknown to criminal jurisprudence, and acquitted all the accused. [This is opinion, not fact.]

He was a human rights activist and stood specially for the rights of Dalits. He also filed case against the encounters by police in Supreme court and demanded that these officers should be booked and the probe should be set up for them. He won the case in Supreme Court of India.

=== Karamchedu (17 July 1985) ===
He resigned from the High Court as a sign of protest in 1984 against the attacks on Dalits in Karamchedu in the then Guntur District, now Bapatla district of AP.

He founded AP Dalita Maha Sabha. He worked all his life to spread the ideas of Dr B R Ambedkar in the society especially among the youths.

== Death ==
He died on 16 September 2016 at his residence in Hyderabad after battling with cancer for 3 years .

== Books ==
- Mahad:The March That's Launched Everyday (2018) published by The Shared Mirror Publishing House, Hyderabad.
- Naalage Godavari (Godavari is Like Me - Poem) in 2000.
- Panchatantram (Novel)
- Brezil Prajala Bhuporatam (The Brazilian's fight for the Land) in 2003 (published by Janapada Vignana Kendram, Hyderabad)
- Poleesulu Arrestu Cheste (If Police arrest you)
- Kulam-Vargam (Caste-Class)
- Dalitulu-Rajyam (Dalits and the State)
- Nela, Naagali, Moodeddulu (Ground, Plow, 3 Bulls)
- Nadi puttina gontuka (The voice that birthed the river)
- Nalupu vyasalu (Nalupu essays)
- Nalupu sampadakeeyaalu (Nalupu editorials)
- Antaranitanam Inkaanaa (Untouchability, even now?)
- Idi reservationla desam (This is a nation of reservations)
- Charitra Marchina manishi - Bojja Appalaswamy (Biography of his father)

== Others ==
- He ran the magazines "Nalupu" and "Neeli Zenda" in Telugu.
