= Dehuli, Firozabad =

Village in Uttar Pradesh, India

Dehuli Dihuli
- Village
- Location in Uttar Pradesh, India
- Coordinates: 27.23122°N 78.56965°E
- Country: India
- State: Uttar Pradesh
- District: Firozabad
- Tehsil: Jasrana

Area
  - Total: 7.157 km^{2} (2.763 sq mi)

Population (2011)
  - Total: 3,683
  - Density: 514.6/km^{2} (1,333/sq mi)
- Time zone: UTC+5:30 (IST)
- PIN: 205145

Dehuli (Dehulī), also spelled Dihuli, is a village in Jasrana block of Firozabad district, Uttar Pradesh, India. It is known for a 1981 incident of caste-based violence where a group of upper-caste gunmen killed 24 people, mainly from the Jatav caste. As of 2011, Dehuli had a population of 3,683, in 593 households.

== Geography ==
Dehuli is located 16 km from Shikohabad, to which it is connected by a road that runs along the Ghoghnipur Branch Canal, which also borders the village. This area used to be part of Mainpuri district. The surrounding fields are planted with rice, mustard, and potatoes.

The village has an area of 715.7 hectares. As of 2011, 4.5 hectares were classified as forest, and 617.2 were under agriculture. All the farmland was irrigated, mostly by canal water but also from tube wells. 1.9 hectares were permanent pastureland, and 59.5 hectares were classified as uncultivable wasteland.

== History ==
On 18 November 1981, a gang of 16 gunmen, dressed in fake police uniforms and led by two young Thakur men, Radhyeshyam ("Radhey") Singh and Santosh ("Santosha") Singh, killed 24 people in Dehuli; they were targeting members of the Jatav community. At least one Muslim youth was also shot and wounded, but let go when the killers realized he was not a Jatav.

Underlying tension between Thakurs and Jatavs had been ongoing for a while before the killings. For example, in 1973, a total of 10 bighas of land were given to several local Jatav families as part of land reform. Most of this was usar, or unsuitable for agriculture; local Thakurs prevented them from being able to demarcate land for themselves; thus they had to work as agricultural labourers for low wages. In the late 1970s, a Jatav named Kunwar Pal had actually headed what later became the Radhey-Santosha gang, with Radhey as his second-in-command. They had a falling out in 1978, when Kunwar Pal allegedly made a pass at a Thakur woman; Kunwar Pal was subsequently beheaded and his body dumped by the Ghoghnipur canal. Then in May 1980, a Jatav had apparently tipped off the police in Jasrana that the Radhey-Santosha gang was in Dehuli, which led to the arrest of two gang members, and at this point the gang sought revenge against the entire local Jatav community.

V. P. Singh, then Chief Minister of Uttar Pradesh, drafted a letter of resignation after the massacre. He stayed on for several more months after both Radhey and Santosha were arrested, and ultimately resigned in June 1982.

== Demographics ==
As of 2011, Dehuli had a population of 3,683, in 593 households. This population was 53.4% male (1,967) and 46.6% female (1,716). The 0-6 age group numbered 667 (356 male and 311 female), making up 18.1% of the total population. 684 residents were members of Scheduled Castes, or 18.6% of the total.

A 1981 write-up in India Today said that the village had about 100 households, of whom 24 were Jatavs (historically: cobblers) and Rangias (historically: tanners), 40 were Thakurs, about 12 were Muslim, and the rest belonged to miscellaneous other castes.

The 1961 census recorded Dehuli (as "Dihuli") as comprising 5 hamlets, with a total population of 1,712 people (919 male and 793 female), in 330 households and 307 physical houses. The area of the village was listed as 1,793 acres.

== Infrastructure ==
As of 2011, Dehuli had one primary school. There was not any kind of dedicated healthcare facility in the village, although some non-licensed medical practitioners and traditional ayurveda healers were present. Drinking water was variously sourced from tap, hand pump, and tube well; there were no public toilets. There was no post office or public library. No regular market or weekly haat was listed as meeting here, and there were no banks or agricultural credit societies. There was at least some access to electricity for all purposes. Streets were made of a mix of both kachcha and pakka materials.
