= 1978 Villupuram atrocity =

Massacre of Dalits

The 1978 Villupuram atrocity was an incident of caste based violence which happened in July 1978 in Villupuram, Tamil Nadu. The violence resulted in 12 Dalits being killed and more than 100 Dalit houses burned down in Periyaparaichery, a Dalit settlement. The violence was caused when a group of Dalits allegedly attacked a dominant caste man after he allegedly molested a Dalit women. Later, dominant caste people attacked the settlement with rocket fireworks and indulged in arsoning and assault. The Dalits also retaliated by setting fire to several dominant caste houses.

Thirty four caste Hindus were arrested, 3 were sentenced to death penalty and 27 others were sentenced to life imprisonment.

== Background ==
Periyaparaichery is located in the Villupuram's city centre. The majority of the Dalits in this hamlet work in the vegetable market as porters and labourers. The businesses in the market are run by Hindus from the Vanniyar, Mudaliar and Nadar castes, as well as Muslims. Periyaparaichery is a slum with eight-hundred mud houses and thatch houses with a population of 3,000 people, nearly all of them belonging to Scheduled Caste. Most in the colony were wage workers and a significant had regular jobs. As per the 1971 Census, Periyaparaichery was home to approximately half of Villupuram's Dalit population. Untouchability and segregation was practiced and Dalits were often referred to with derogatory caste names.

The top Government officials, the revenue divisional officer and the deputy superintendent of police in Viluppuram are all Dalits.

== Causes ==
A young Dalit lady was insulted at the vegetable market by a dominant caste laborer working at one of the vegetable shops on the afternoon of July 23, 1978. He allegedly flirted with her and grabbed her breast as she stooped down to pick tomatoes for her husband's lunch. Her husband later went to the perpetrator's place to enquire about the incident and later beat him up along with other Dalits.

The Vegetable Merchants Association lodged a complaint with the Deputy superintendent of police the same night and intended to hold a hartal the next day in protest of the assault. The next morning, the dominant caste man who was attacked filed a complaint, identifying seven Dalit people as assaulters. The next day the demonstration was held with under the leadership of president of the Vegetable Merchants Association and others including a number All India Anna Dravida Munnetra Kazhagam(AIADMK) office bearers of the town. During the demonstration, anti-Dalit statements were chanted, such as "Displace Dalits from the City Center" and "Paraiyans' wives are our concubines." The accused Dalits turned themselves up at the police station and the police called a peace meet between both the two groups. A case was also filed against them. The caste Hindus, however, skipped the meeting and instead convened a secret gathering at Muthuthoppu, a dominating caste neighborhood where all agreed to attack the Periyaparaichery.

== Violence ==
On 11:30 pm of 24 July, a dominant caste crowd moved towards Periyaparaichery where they assaulted two rickshaw men and burned down their rickshaws. The rickshaw men bleeding, went to the police station and filed a complaint on the attackers who they claimed attacked with crowbars and knives. The crowd set fire to eight Dalit homes. The crowd used rockets and explosives reportedly from firework industries in the town to attack the colony from the outside. The property of a respected Dalit teacher in the neighborhood was one of the first to be attacked and was completely destroyed in the fire. The fire truck which was called to put out the fire was halted by the dominant caste members until the Dalits pushed the crowd to make way for the vehicle. The crowd was later dispersed. Several Dalit houses were destroyed in this attack.

On the morning of July 25, the dominant caste members aimed rockets which destroyed five more huts. The Dalits in retaliation torched houses of the dominant caste members and attacked them. A number of hundred steel-helmeted policemen stood idle during the carnage. 80 to 100 Dalit houses were destroyed and at least 12 Dalits were killed on the same day by skull factures and injuries to vital organs. The Villupuram police force was severely depleted after a significant portion of it was deployed to oversee the Madurai Municipal elections.

On July 27, three more bodies were found.

During the violence, Tamil Nadu Chief Minister M. G. Ramachandran was 200 km away in Madurai, canvassing for the Municipal elections.

== Aftermath and convictions ==
Indian National Congress leader Jagjivan Ram, M. Karunanidhi, and Chief Minister M.G.Ramachandran visited the afflicted area. The government formed an Enquiry Commission which was established on July 29, 1978. 41 caste Hindus were implicated to the crime, and 34 of them were detained. In the court verdict, three accused were condemned to death which was later lowered to a life sentence and 27 others were sentenced to life in prison. Many of those sentenced to life in prison were later released when the time of their convictions were later reduced.

== Bibliography ==
- Vakil, A. K. (1985). Reservation Policy and Scheduled Castes in India. APH Publishing. ISBN 978-81-7024-016-7.
- Balasubramaniam, J. (2013-07-01). "Villupuram Atrocity: Physical and Symbolic Violence against Dalits". Contemporary Voice of Dalit. 6 (2): 117–122. doi:10.1177/0974354520130201. ISSN 2455-328X. S2CID 187229866.
- Economic and Political Weekly (1978). "The Villupuram Atrocity". Economic and Political Weekly. 13 (41): 1721–1725. ISSN 0012-9976. JSTOR 4367015.
