= Arige Ramaswamy =

Indian social activist (1885–1973)

- Born: 1885; Ramankole, Hyderabad State, British India
- Died: 23 January 1973 (aged 87–88); Hyderabad, India
- Occupations: Political leader; social reformer
- Spouse: Rajamma (m.1921) Lalitabai (m.1929)

Arige Ramaswamy (1885 – 23 January 1973) was an Indian social activist, politician and social reformer.

== Early life ==
Born on 1885 in a Mala family to Arige Balayya at Ramankole, Hyderabad State (now Secunderabad, Andhra Pradesh). He also worked as ticket collector in Nizam's railways.

He was follower of Achala Siddhanta and also the Brahmo Samaj. He founded Sunitha Bala Samajam and carried out social reform among the Dalits.

== Movement ==
He worked along with Bhagya Reddy Varma, S. Venkat Rao and other activists, who organized the Dalits in the early 20th century. Recognising the socio-economic backwardness of Madigas, he formed the Arundhatiya Association for their welfare.

Ramaswamy married a Madiga boy with a Mala girl, which was opposed by Bhagya Reddy Varma and the community members. In 1922, he established Adi Hindu Jathoyonnathi Sabha.

== Politics ==
Later, he joined INC and became Joint Secretary in Telangana Congress and been Minister in state govt. He was also associated with "Grandhalaya (library)" movement.

He died on 23 January 1973 at Hyderabad, Andhra Pradesh.
