= Tsunduru massacre =

1991 killing of Dalits in Andhra Pradesh, India

Tsunduru Massacre
- Part of Caste-related violence in India
- Location: Tsunduru, Guntur district, Andhra Pradesh, India
- Date: August 6, 1991; 11:00 am (IST)
- Target: Dalits (Mala community)
- Attack type: Massacre, caste violence
- Weapons: Bladed weapons, possibly blunt objects
- Deaths: 8
- Victim: Dalit men from the Mala community
- Perpetrator: Reddy caste men
- Assailants: Reddy men, alleged support from police
- Motive: Caste-based discrimination, retaliation for Dalit assertion
- Inquiry: Andhra Pradesh Civil Liberties Committee
- Accused: 212 individuals charged in 12 separate cases
- Charges: Various charges including murder
- Verdict: Hyderabad High Court dismissed charges due to lack of evidence
- Convicted: None (all acquitted due to lack of evidence)

The Tsunduru Massacre refers to the killing of several Dalit people in the village of Tsunduru, Guntur district, Andhra Pradesh, India, on 6 August 1991. 8 Dalits were massacred by Reddy men with the alleged help of the police. In the month before the massacre, a young graduate Dalit youth had been beaten because he allegedly touched a Reddy woman near a cinema hall by accident. As a result, Dalits were socially boycotted by the Reddy landowners of the village. Many Dalits lost their livelihood, since they earned their daily wages by working in the paddy fields of the Reddys. After the massacre, Dalits collectively fought for legal justice by invoking the SC/ST Prevention of Atrocities Act of 1989, but ultimately, none of the 212 individuals charged were convicted.

== Background ==
The village of Tsunduru was locally dominated by the Reddy peasantry but attained notable economic, social, and political power in Andhra following independence. The Reddy community also participated in the non-Brahmin movement to claim Kshatriya status. Following this post-colonial development, on 7 July 1991, Ravi, a Dalit boy, had accidentally touched a Reddy women sitting in front of him in a cinema hall with his foot. Ravi apologized immediately, but some Reddy youth roughed him up. Later, Ravi was tracked down, beat up, and forced to drink brandy by some Reddy youth, and the Reddy youth brought Ravi to a police station and demanded that he be arrested for allegedly misbehaving with women while drunk. A parallel incident occurred with another Dalit boy named Rajababu, who was knifed in Tsundur by a certain Krishna Reddy for allegedly grazing his body against two Reddy girls outside a cinema hall, a claim which the Dalit side contests. Following these two incidents, there were a social boycott of Dalits that lasted a month, which forced them to travel to Tenali to buy basic provisions or Ongole for work. The attacks on the Dalits of Tsundur were carried out to 'teach them a lesson', primarily to try to make them submissive to the local caste Hindus, such as the dominant Reddy peasantry, and comply with their position as 'untouchables'. This position was challenged as Dalit families in the village sought to educate their children so they could be independent of low social status. Many Dalits believed that their caste held a much higher rate of literacy on average than the local Reddy community, who were believed to not be as interested in educational attainment. It is widely believed that these events lead to the massacre

== Massacre ==
On 6 August 1991 at around 11.00 am, police forces suddenly entered the homes of Mala Dalit families, causing the Mala men to flee into the fields at the request of the local women who were worried about their safety. Armed Reddy men were lying in wait. and when the Dalit men entered the fields they were hacked down and murdered. Some of the victims' corpses were thrown into nearby fields while others were thrown in the river. Local police were reported to have not acted at all to prevent the massacre. The attack was not reported for over 24 hours until a Dalit woman escaped the village and walked over 17 miles to notify the district collector in Guntur. After the massacre, the remaining Dalits fled to Tenali, where they were offered refuge by the Salvation Army Church.

== Prosecution ==
212 people were charged in a total of 12 separate cases regarding the incident. 33 defendants subsequently died and the Supreme Court of India then dismissed the charges citing lack of evidence. A Division Bench comprising Justices L. Narasimha Reddy and M.S. Jaiswal turned down the verdict of trial court saying the prosecution had failed to prove the exact time of death, place of occurrence and the identity of attackers. A report by the Andhra Pradesh Civil Liberties Committee titled The Chundur Carnage August 6, 1991, was published. It was reprinted in the anthology The Hunger of the Republic: Our Present in Retrospect (2021) published by Tulika Books.

Bojja Tharakam was senior public prosecutor Tsunduru massacre case in the Andhra Pradesh High Court.

== See also ==
- Neerukonda massacre
- Karamchedu massacre
- List of Scheduled Castes in Andhra Pradesh & Telangana
