= Dalit Camera =

Indian news website

- Founded: 2011
- Founder: Raees Mohammed (previously Ravichandran Bathran)
- Type: News website and YouTube channel
- Purpose: "Documenting life in India from the perspective of Dalit, Adivasi, Bahujan, and other minority communities"
- Location: India

Dalit Camera is a news website and YouTube channel set up in 2011 by Raees Mohammed (previously Ravichandran Bathran) to document life in India from the perspective of Dalit, Adivasi and Bahujan people and other minorities living in India. It has been described as the first use of videos uploaded on social media to highlight the difficulties faced by Dalit students.

== Evolution of Dalit Camera ==
By 2014, Dalit Camera had a 23-member team working with four video cameras. Initially attracting attention in Andhra Pradesh, by then it was also being viewed by significant numbers in the states of Kerala and West Bengal, and was gaining viewers elsewhere in India and worldwide. It has been described as the first use of videos uploaded on social media to highlight the difficulties faced by Dalit students.

Aside from documenting, for example, the reaction of Dalit women to an incident of rape, it has showcased Dalit music and the activist-writer Arundhati Roy, whom it has also criticised. Being online, it by-passes the distribution problems of previous attempts to provide a media outlet for the Dalit people — print publications struggle to survive because sales outlets are often reluctant to be considered associated with the Dalit movement.

== Digital censorship ==
YouTube briefly terminated the Dalit Camera account in January 2017. The channel's page carried a notice that this was due to concerns about copyright infringement, although Ravichandran claimed that "YouTube has never welcomed depiction of content related to Dalit issues. A lot of explicit content is usually uploaded by YouTube but the site has a distaste for videos depicting Dalit and minority issues." There was some speculation that YouTube might have bowed to pressure from Hyderabad Police following the conviction for defamation in December 2016 of some English and Foreign Languages University research scholars who had been featured on the channel. The channel had covered reaction to work posted by Rohith Vemula and his death.

A collection of essays and debates from Dalit Camera has been published as Hatred In The Belly by Round Table India, which is a Dalit activist platform. Dalit Camera also has films featuring B. R. Ambedkar’s speeches, clips of his funeral procession, a television series on the making of the Indian Constitution, as well as of riots in early 2018 at Bhima Koregaon, filmed and shared by the members of the public.

== History ==
The Dalit Camera YouTube channel was created by Raees Mohammad (previously Ravichandran Bathran) after he had been attacked by a group of Akhil Bharatiya Vidyarthi Parishad supporters on the campus of English and Foreign Languages University (EFLU), Hyderabad, Andhra Pradesh, for being a left-wing student leader. He says he started the channel to give a voice to give Dalit movements a voice on the internet because mainstream media doesn't cover their issues. He is a Dalit from the state of Tamil Nadu and has finished his Phd from Indian Institute of Advanced Studies in Shimla. The members of Dalit Camera have pooled in money from their own resources to cover stories for their YouTube channel. They also claim to have raised funds from their funds. In order to leave the caste system and 'bury his Hindu identity', Ravichandran Bathran converted into Islam and became Raees Mohammad on 20 January 2020.
