= Nepaldalitinfo =

Nepaldalitinfo is an international network with an email listserve, which is an invaluable informational resource for Dalits of Nepal. The network was founded in 2003 by Dr. Drona Prakash Rasali, with small group of Dalits intellectuals, working on a set of working demands of Nepalese Dalits to bring out the ground realities, contemporary issues and relevant information for their dignity and freedom from the traditional neglect and oppression in the mainstream society of Nepal. Currently, the Nepaldalitinfo has on its membership, nearly 700 Dalit intellectuals and friends of Dalits from all walks of life including academics and rights groups in Nepal and other countries around the world including Europe and Americas.
