= Bhagya Reddy Varma =

Indian political leader and social reformer (1888–1939)

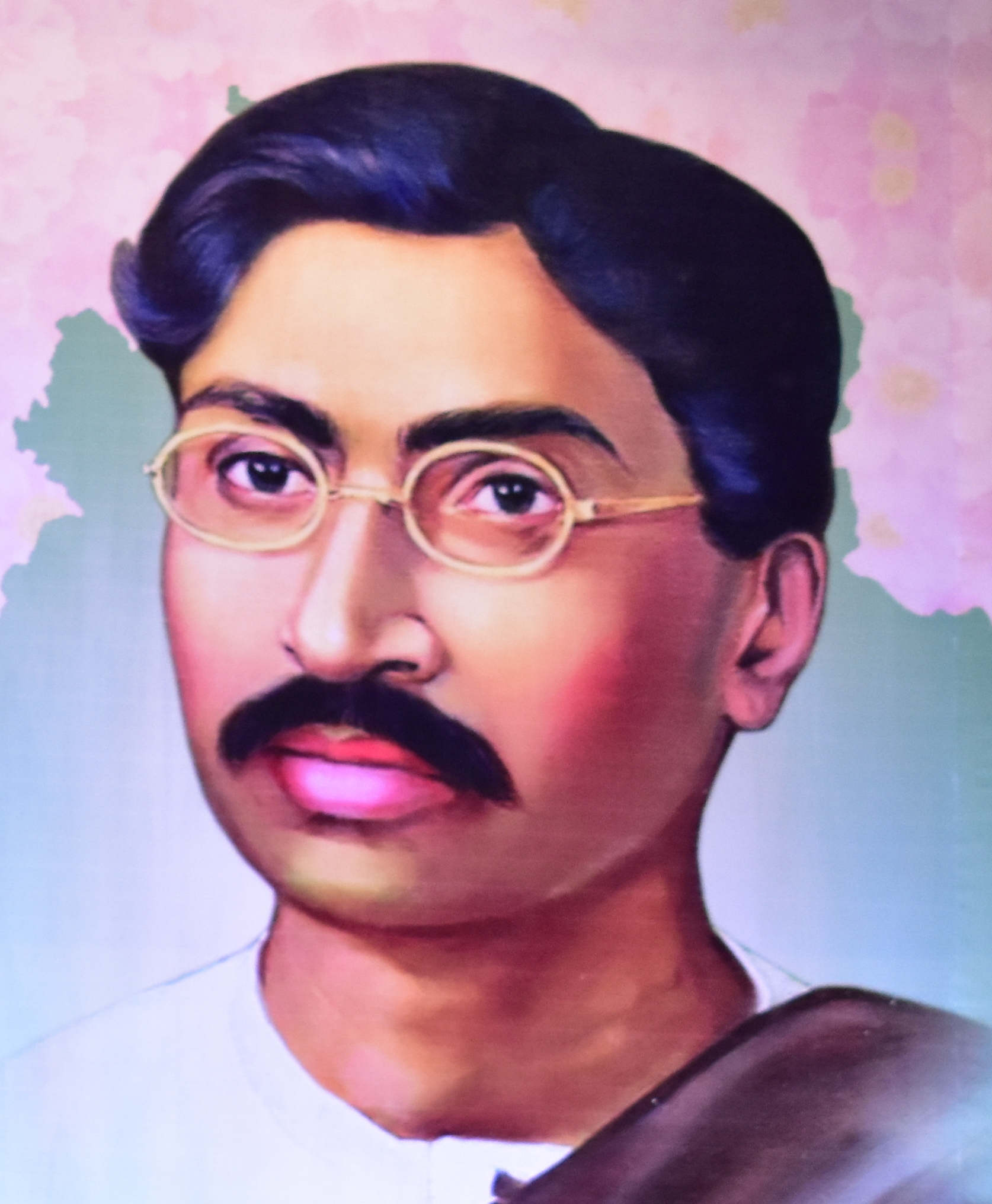
- Bhagya Reddy Varma poster from 134th Jayanthi Celebrations at Ravindra Bharathi
- Born: Madari Bagaiah; 22 May 1888; Hyderabad State, British India
- Died: 18 February 1939 (aged 50); Hyderabad State, British India
- Occupations: Educational activist Social reformer Modern thinker Deccan revolution leader
- Spouse: Madari Ragmamba

Bhagya Reddy Varma (22 May 1888 – 18 February 1939), born Madari Bagaiah, was a political leader, social reformer and activist known for advocating against untouchability in Hyderabad State and for the abolition of the Jogini and Devdasi systems. He launched the Adi-Hindu movement in the Hyderabad region of British India, beginning in 1912, and later established the Adi-Hindu Social Service League in 1924, which promoted social reform for the Depressed Classes in Nizam's Hyderabad (modern-day Telangana).

== Early life ==
Varma was born into the Hindu Mala caste in the Princely State of Hyderabad.

== Movements ==
Inspired by figures such as B. R. Ambedkar and Jyotirao Phule, Varma started his movement, standing against discrimination by upper castes. Eventually, he established the Adi Hindu ("Original Hindu"), a social organization, to bring awareness to the Dalits. In 1906, he formed a group called Jagan Mitra Mandali, which involved Dalits and Malas, and started telling stories using Harikatha (popular folklore). It was one of the pioneering organisations for depressed classes in Hyderabad State. In 1910, he started to educate Dalit children, and in a short span of time he was able to run 25 centers with 2,000 students. In 1911, Adi Hindu social services started, and in 1912 he began promoting Buddhism.

In 1917, in a conference in Vijayawada, the Pratam Andhra - Adi Hindu meeting was held. In the same year, Varma’s speech gained M.K Gandhi's attention at the 'Akhila Bharata Hindu' Round Table Conference in Calcutta. In 1919, a meeting was held with Jangamulu, Dasulu and Mulnavasi, for the Adi Hindu beneficial program. The purpose of this event was to resolve the internal issues in the Dalit community; he even insisted that the panchayat court system be rebuilt. The first Adi Hindu conference was held in 1921 in Hyderabad, led by T.J. Papanna.

In 1925, a conference was led by N.M.R. Mukund Reddy. In the same year, the Adi Hindu Hand Skills Exhibition was held to showcase the Dalits' skills. Varma also campaigned on many social issues, including child marriage, black magic, women’s education, and alcohol prohibition. His work spread to the neighboring states of Karnataka, Tamil Nadu, Maharashtra, and Andhra; from there some well-known people joined and followed the revolution.

In an historical speech in 1930, he announced bringing Dalit issues to British notice in the upcoming All India Round Table Conference at Lucknow in the same year. He proposed to send Dr. B. R. Ambedkar to lead the group. The agenda was to recognise Dalits as Adi Hindu, rather than untouchables, Mala or Madiga.

In 1931, the Nizam government came forward to meet Varma’s demands and registered Dalits as Adi Hindus in the general elections. Nizam Osman Ali Khan, Asaf Jah VII praised Varma for his social work, and recognised it with an award. Later, the Nizam appointed Varma as the chief adviser to his government. Adi Hindu Bhavan at Chadarghat, Hyderabad had been the platform for many revolutionary meetings. It is said that he gave nearly 3,348 speeches.

The Bhagya Memorial Girls High School at Esamia Bazar, Koti, Hyderabad, Telangana, which he started in 1913, is still functioning today.

Varma launched a movement against the devadasi pratha, forcing the Nizam to declare it a crime.

== Honours ==
In 1913, Arya Samaj organised a function to honour Varma with the title Varma.

During the Telangana Movement in 2017, the students of the Telangana region wanted to rename the G. M. C. Balayogi Athletic Stadium at Gachibowli as Bhagya Reddy Varma Stadium.
