= Pitambar Tarai =

Indian poet

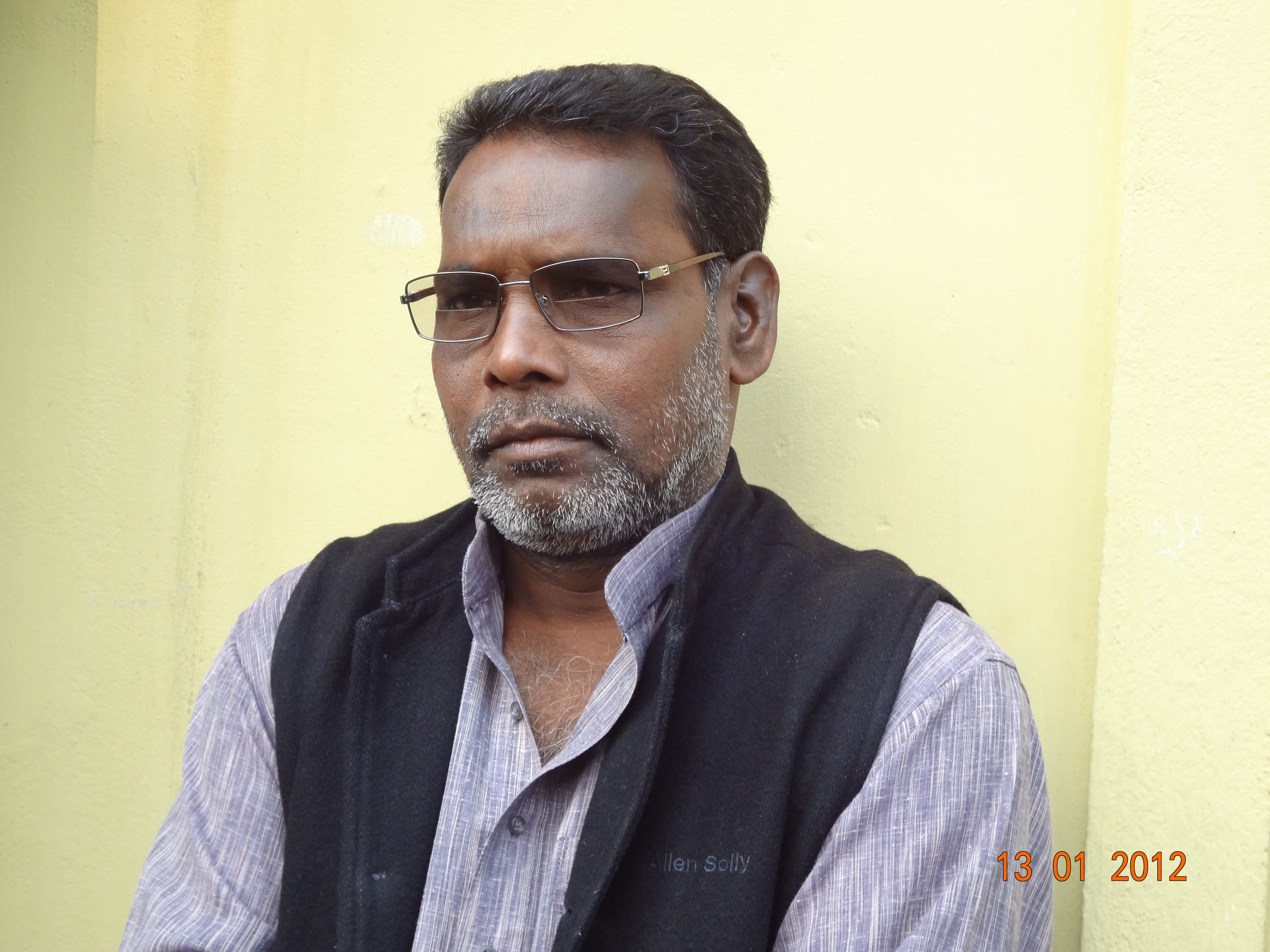
- Tarai standing in front of a yellow wall
- Born: 1959 (age 66–67); Mangarajpur, Jagatsinghpur, Odisha, India
- Citizenship: India
- Occupation: Writer
- Writing career
- Genre: Poetry
- Subject: Emotional qualities of the human experience Dalit
- Notable awards: Odisha Sahitya Academy Award

Pitambar Tarai (Born in 1959) is an Odisha Sahitya Academy awarded poet from Odisha, India. The prominent occupation in his family was commercial fishing. He was born in Mangarajpur village south of Kujang in the Jagatsinghpur district, Odisha. His poetry is mostly concerned with emotional topics of life, like sorrow and happiness. A common theme of his work is the mentioning of the Dalit, the lowest caste of Indian society.

== Bibliography ==
=== Poetry Collection ===
- Boonde Luhara peethire samudra – 1987
- Adi Parva – 1994
- Chita-chaitara chitha – 2002
- Raaga Rudrakshari – 2004
- Sairata Shatak
- Deha Dasabisha – 2007
- Itara – 2007
- Shudrakara Shloka – 2008
- Abhajana – 2010
- Pichhila tarikha o anyanya Kavita
- Sesha heba jain

=== Children's Literature ===
- Luha Lahaka Patara Banka

== Awards ==
- Odisha Sahitya Academy Award(For Abhajana)
- Prajatantra Kavita Samman
- Chandrabhaga Kavita Samman
- Basant Muduli Kavita Samman
- Teer Tarang Kavita Samman
- Odisha Dalit Sahitya Academy Samman
- Dadhichi Samman
