= Parham, Uttar Pradesh =

Village in Uttar Pradesh, India

Parham
- Village
- Location within Uttar Pradesh Location within India
- Coordinates: 27°19′04″N 78°40′01″E
- Country: India
- State: Uttar Pradesh
- District: Firozabad
- Tehsil: Jasrana
- Elevation: 166 m (545 ft)

Population (2011)
  - Total: 19,642
- Time zone: UTC+5:30 (IST)
- PIN: 205130

Parham is a village in Jasrana Tehsil, Firozabad District, Uttar Pradesh, India. As of the year 2011, it has a population of 19,642.

== Geography ==
Parham is located at the south of Arind River, approximately 32 kilometres northeast of the district capital Firozabad, and 9 kilometres north of the subdistrict capital Jasrana. Shikohabad Road passes through the east of the town. The average elevation of the village is at 166 metres above the sea level.

== Climate ==
Parham has a Humid Subtropical Climate (Cwa). It receives the most rainfall in July, with on average 256 mm of precipitation; and the least rainfall in November, with 6 mm of precipitation.

Climate data for Parham
Month	Jan	Feb	Mar	Apr	May	Jun	Jul	Aug	Sep	Oct	Nov	Dec	Year
Mean daily maximum °C (°F)	20.6 (69.1)	24.4 (75.9)	30.8 (87.4)	37.3 (99.1)	39.8 (103.6)	37.9 (100.2)	33 (91)	31.8 (89.2)	31.9 (89.4)	31.8 (89.2)	27.7 (81.9)	22.7 (72.9)	30.8 (87.4)
Daily mean °C (°F)	14.1 (57.4)	17.7 (63.9)	23.5 (74.3)	29.8 (85.6)	32.9 (91.2)	32.9 (91.2)	29.5 (85.1)	28.4 (83.1)	27.8 (82.0)	25.6 (78.1)	20.9 (69.6)	15.8 (60.4)	24.9 (76.8)
Mean daily minimum °C (°F)	8.1 (46.6)	11.2 (52.2)	16 (61)	21.7 (71.1)	25.8 (78.4)	27.8 (82.0)	26.5 (79.7)	25.7 (78.3)	24.1 (75.4)	19.4 (66.9)	14.5 (58.1)	9.6 (49.3)	19.2 (66.6)
Average rainfall mm (inches)	17 (0.7)	22 (0.9)	12 (0.5)	9 (0.4)	12 (0.5)	91 (3.6)	256 (10.1)	236 (9.3)	125 (4.9)	20 (0.8)	6 (0.2)	10 (0.4)	816 (32.3)
Source: Climate-Data.org

== Demographics ==
As per the 2011 Indian Census, Parham has 3,180 households and 19,642 residents. Out of the total population, 10,505 are male and 9,137 are female. The total literacy rate is 59.6%, with 7,159 of the male population and 4,548 of the female population being literate. The census location code of the village is 125747.
