= Murder of Indra Meghwal =

2022 murder in Rajasthan, India

Indra Kumar Meghwal was a nine-year old Dalit boy studying in a Saraswati Vidya Mandir, a private school in Surana, a small village in Sayala, Jalore, Rajasthan. He died after being hit by teacher Chail Singh for drinking water from a pot used only by upper castes.

The initial reports were contradicted by both the Rajasthan police and the Rajasthan State Commission for Protection of Child Right investigating the issue. They claimed that the beating was unlikely due to a caste-angle.

On August 19, 2022, Dalit groups staged protests and demonstrations demanding justice for the victim's family.
