= Kandikuppa =

Kandikuppa Thokala vari peta
- Village
- Interactive map of Kandikuppa
- Location in Andhra Pradesh, India Kandikuppa (India)
- Coordinates: 16.593125°N 82.20051°E
- Country: India
- State: Andhra Pradesh
- District: Konaseema

Languages
  - Official: Telugu
- Time zone: UTC+5:30 (IST)
- PIN: 533212

Kandikuppa is situated in Konaseema district in Katrenikona, in Andhra Pradesh State, India.
