= Katti Padma Rao =

Indian Dalit Poet

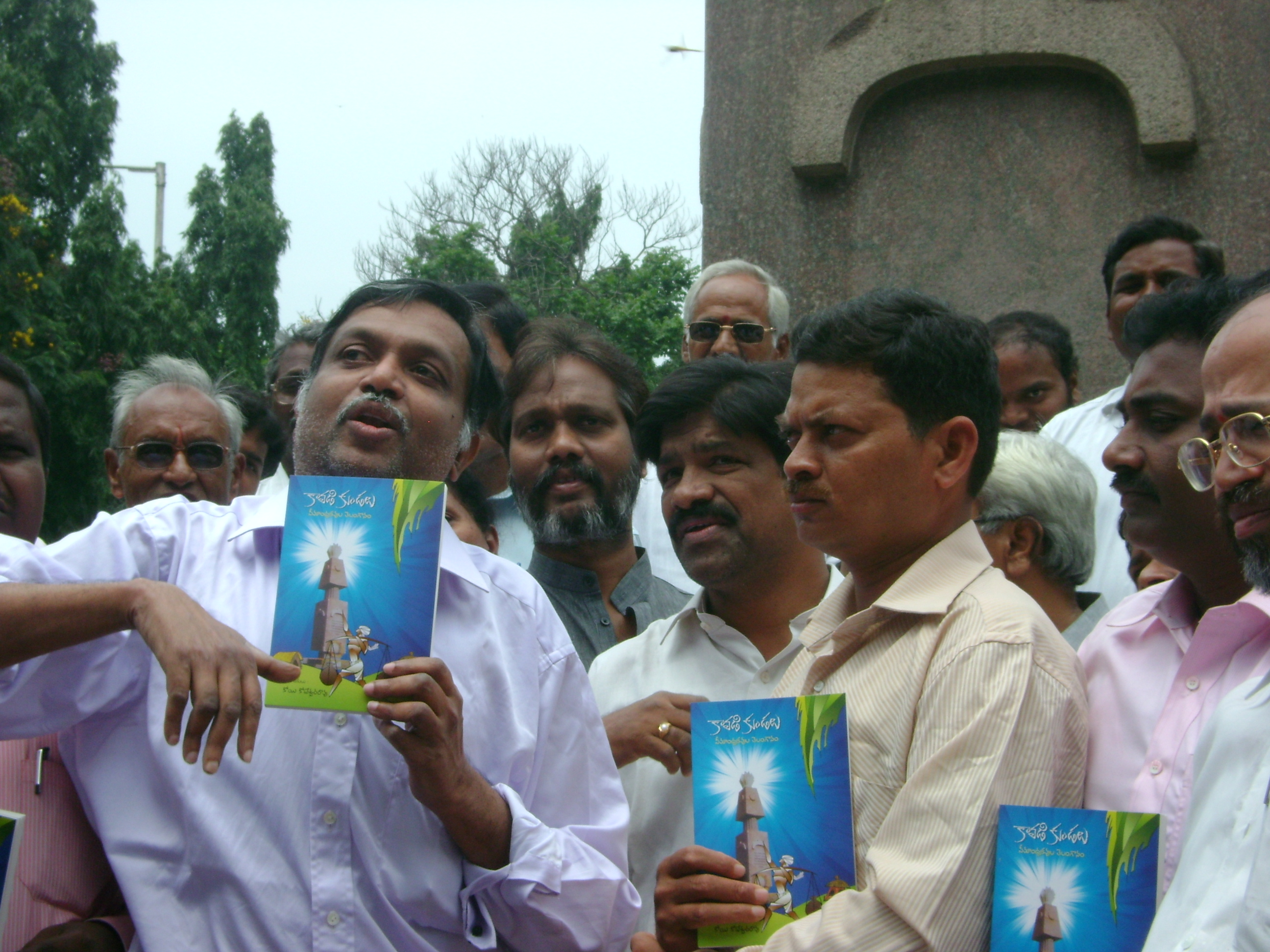
- Born: 27 July 1953 (age 73); Guntur district, Andhra Pradesh, India
- Occupations: Dalit activist, publicist, and leader of the Dalit Mahasabha
- Writing career
- Language: Telugu

Katti Padma Rao (born 27 July 1953) is a Dalit poet, scholar and activist from Andhra Pradesh, India. He is the founding general secretary of Dalit Mahasabha, a people's organisation that spearheaded the Dalit movement in Andhra Pradesh in the aftermath of the 1985 Karamchedu massacre in the coastal region of that state. A scholar in both Telugu and Sanskrit, he has published several volumes of poetry, and books on sociology, religion, philosophy, history, and women's studies. He is a regular columnist in major Telugu newspapers and magazines.

== Social and political activism ==
Following the Karamchedu Massacre where Kammas slaughtered Madiga Dalits in 1985, Rao emerged as a significant socio-political activist. He was the founder General Secretary of the Andhra Pradesh Dalit Mahasabha organisation, which mobilised not only the Dalits, but also the Adivasis and the Backward Classes against caste-based atrocities and oppression.

== Electoral politics ==
Rao launched the Peda Prajala Party (Poor People's Party) in the late 1980s. In the early 1990s, he was part of the Bahujan Samaj Party. In the late 2000s, he joined the Praja Rajyam Party. His forays into electoral politics were largely unsuccessful.

== Awards and honours ==
Rao is recognised as a Dalit ideologue, intellectual, writer and socio-political activist.

A list of awards and honours received by Rao:

- Sahitya Puraskar from the Loknayak Foundation. The award is given annually in memory of N.T. Rama Rao and Harivansh Rai Bachchan.
- Boyi Bhimanna Trust Award for literature from Chief Minister of Andhra Pradesh, Y. S. Rajasekhara Reddy in 2007
- Pratibha Award from the Government of Andhra Pradesh for poetry in 2006
- Sri Ramulu Telugu University Award for Poetry in 2006
- Sahitya Puraskaram by Andhra Saraswatha Parishat by the Governor of Andhra Pradesh, Sushil Kumar Shinde, 2006
- Avantsa Soma Sunder Sahiti Trust Award in 2005
- Dr. C. Narayana Reddy Sahiti Award, Sri Narayana Reddy Kalapeetam, Hyderabad, 2003
- Ambedkar Award, 1992, Hyderabad

== Works ==
=== Titles in English ===
- Women and Caste in India (1983)
- Social and Philosophical Movements in India (1991)
- Dalit Women (1991)
- Dr. B. R. Ambedkar: The Visionary
- Caste and Alternative Culture (1995)
- Charvaka Darshan (1998)
- Woman in Indian Culture (1999)
- Journey towards Dalit Dignity (1999)
- Buddhist Philosophy (2007)

=== Anthologies ===
- Jana Geetham (1979)
- Hethuvada Satyalu (1980)
- Jailu Gantalu (1986)
- Vimukthi Geetham (1987)
- Desam Diary (1987)
- Raktha Kshetram (1992)
- Nalla Kaluva (1996)
- Neelikeka
- Mullakireetam poetry (2002)
- Bhoomi Basha poetry (2004)
- Kattela Moppu poetry (2007)
- Aatma gaurava swaram (2010)
- Ambedkar
- Samghika Viplavamoorthy: Dr. B. R. Ambedkar (1990)
- Ambedkar-Gandhi (2001)
- Ambedkar-Marx-Phule (2001)
- Ambedkar-Buddha (2002)
- Ambedkar Thatvasastram (2007)

=== Sociology ===
- Kula Samgharshanalu (1983)
- Kulam Punadulu (1981)
- Reservations: Hindu Mathonmadam (1991)
- Kulam — Prathyamnaya Samskrithi (1993)

=== Dalit history ===
- Dalithula Charitra (1st Part)
- Dalithula Charitra (2nd Part, 1997)
- Dalithula Charitra (3rd Part, 1998)
- Dalithula Charitra (4th Part, 1999)

=== Alternative Dalit philosophy ===
- Charvaka Darshan (1991)
- Buddha Darshan (1997)
- Dalita Darshanam (2008)
- Mahatma Phule (2008)

=== Women's studies ===
- Bharatheeya Samskruthilo Sthree (1993)
- PitruSwamya Vyavasthalo Sthree (2002)

=== Dalit literature ===
- Samghika Viplava Rachayithalu (1983)
- Dalitha Sahitya Vudyamam — Joshua (1995)
- Joshua Samajika Thatvam (1995)
- Mahakavi Jasuva Samajika viplavam (2007)
- Santh Ravidas Bhakti kavitodhyamam (2008)
