= SC, ST Sub-Plan (Andhra Pradesh) =

SC, ST Sub-Plan, also known as Indiramma Kalalu, refers to the financial commitment of the Government of Andhra Pradesh, in India, for the welfare of scheduled castes and scheduled tribes. An implementing law was passed in the Andhra Pradesh Legislative Assembly in May 2013. The groups were to have independent panels for auditing expenditure. The plan is meant to prevent the Government from diverting funds meant for SCs and STs to other programs, which was the historical practice.

== The Plan ==
Out of the total budget, 40 per cent of allocated funds are meant for improving infrastructure.

== Opposition ==
Ravela Kishore Babu alleged that the legislation is little more than a farm-waiver scheme and has been urging lawmakers to further analyse the plan for potential ramifications.
