= Mala (caste) =

Caste in South India

- Religions: Hinduism; Christianity
- Languages: Telugu; Tamil
- Populated states: Andhra Pradesh • Telangana • Karnataka • Tamil Nadu
- Ethnicity: Telugu people Tamil people

Mala is a South Indian caste from the Indian states of Andhra Pradesh, Tamil Nadu, and Telangana. They are also present in smaller numbers in the states of Karnataka and Maharashtra. They are classified as a Scheduled Caste (SC) by the Government of India. According to 2001 census data, Malas constituted 41.6 percent (5.39 lakh) of the Scheduled Castes population in the then state of Andhra Pradesh, which also included the present state of Telangana.

== History ==
In the Telugu heroic epic literature associated with the Battle of Palnadu (c. 12th century CE), a figure identified in modern commemorative contexts as Mala Kannamadasu appears within the narrative cycle surrounding the conflict. Scholarly analyses of the Palnadu epic corpus describe the portrayal of Brahmanaidu as challenging caste hierarchies, including the incorporation or adoption of an outcaste warrior figure within the epic narrative framework.

Mala Kannamadasu is a name associated with the cultural and literary memory of the Battle of Palnadu (c. 1178–1182 CE), a medieval conflict in present-day Andhra Pradesh, India. The battle occupies an important place in regional historiography and Telugu heroic literature, particularly within the Palnati Vīrula Katha epic cycle.

== Literary and Cultural Context ==
The Battle of Palnadu is memorialized in Telugu heroic epic literature that narrativizes the conflict between rival factions led by Nalagamaraju and Malidevaraju. Scholarly studies of South Indian epic traditions discuss the portrayal of Brahmanaidu as challenging caste hierarchies within the narrative framework, including the incorporation of an outcaste warrior figure known as Kannama.

In modern commemorative contexts, the name "Mala Kannamadasu" is used in association with this epic tradition.

== Modern Commemoration ==
In 2023, Telugu-language news sources reported the installation of a statue identified as "Palnati warrior Mala Kannamadasu" near the historic battlefield area at Karampudi in Palnadu district.

The installation reflects contemporary community recognition of the figure within the broader Palnadu heroic narrative.

== Historiographical Status ==
While the Battle of Palnadu itself is discussed in historical and literary sources, no currently identified published inscriptional corpus—such as South Indian Inscriptions or Archaeological Survey of India epigraphic volumes—independently attests to Mala Kannamadasu by name in contemporary 12th-century records. References to Mala Kannamadasu therefore derive from literary tradition and modern commemorative narratives rather than confirmed medieval epigraphic documentation.

In contemporary regional commemoration, Telugu-language press reported the installation of a statue identified as “Palnati warrior Mala Kannamadasu” near Karampudi in 2023, reflecting continuing cultural memory associated with the Palnadu epic cycle. During the 12th century, Palanati Brahmanaidu, the minister of Palnadu, took Kannamma Dasu, a Mala who valiantly fought and died in the Battle of Palnadu, under his patronage. Subsequently, the descendants of Kannama Dasu were known as Mala Dasulus and were appointed as head priests of the Chennakesava Swamy Temples. Malas are traditional silk weavers as well. Even these sects exists presently in some parts of Andhra Pradesh.

In 1909, Edgar Thurston noted that Malas were originally a tribe of freelance hill warriors and paid mercenaries who raided and looted under the Polygars of Vijayanagara.

=== Mala Masti ===
Mala Masti (also spelled Mala Mashti) is a subgroup associated with the Mala community in Andhra Pradesh and Telangana. A 2023 ethnographic study describes Mala Mastis as a dependent/service community historically connected to Malas, with traditions involving physical performance and public entertainment, and notes parallel groups described as Madiga Mastis in older ethnographic accounts.

=== Copper-plate commendation (reported) ===
The same 2023 study reports a Telugu copper-plate citation dated to around 1515 CE and attributes it to the reign of the Vijayanagara emperor Krishna Deva Raya (reigned 1509–1529). The article states that the copper plate (described as weighing about two kilograms) came to light near Farijallipeta, close to Rajanagaram in East Godavari district, and that it commended Mala Mastis as devoted soldiers. Krishna Deva Raya's reign dates are given by standard reference works.

In the 19th century, many Malas, especially in coastal Andhra, converted to Lutheranism after the arrival of Christian missionaries.

In 1917, Bhagya Reddy Varma & Aringe Ramaswamy organised Adi-Andhra movement led Malas alongside Madigas to be part of Dravidian ideology. In the census of 1931, about a lot of them mentioned their castes as Adi Andhra and were officially included into the list of Depressed Classes in 1935 Govt. of India Acts and later got carried in 1950 Constitution of India.

With the advent of the Green revolution, Reddys, who had bought up lands from the erstwhile Brahmin landlords. However, the landless Dalits (mainly Malas) and backward classes still faced dire circumstances due to lack of support from various governments. Dalits were unable to obtain land, or quality education. Starting in the 1980s with the political ascendancy of the Reddy communities, Malas and other Dalits became the targets of violence with increasing frequency and brutality. Influenced by Ambedkarite and Marxist thought, the Dalit Mahasabha, with charismatic leaders such as Katti Padma Rao and Bhojja Tarakam sought the annihilation of caste and untouchability through social transformation, very different from the Gandhian ideals of "upliftment." Their demands also included true land reform. A boost to their organization occurred after the brutal Tsundur massacre of 1991, where Reddys slaughtered 8 Malas. However, the movement was weakened when Rao sought to enter electoral politics.

== Politics ==
When the Bahujan Samaj Party and Samajwadi Party won the Uttar Pradesh assembly elections in 1993, it gave hope to Katti Padma Rao that a similar victory could be achieved in Andhra Pradesh. However, because of this, the movement split: with Rao leading a faction favouring political influence and Tarakam leading a separate faction. Rao's dreams were shattered by the assembly elections of 1994, where the TDP promised a slew of populist schemes to counter the mobilization of subaltern castes and won decisively.

Tarakam opposed the 'Madiga Dandora Movement' in 1990s related to categorisation of the Scheduled Caste quota and denied allegations of snatching major share of caste quotas and established 'Mala Mahanadu' to counter its demands. However, the CBN government, sensing an opportunity to divide the Dalits, established a commission which recommended sub-categorization of SC quota. This infuriated the Malas and inexorably divided the Malas and Madigas, so that a united Dalit movement would be less strong than earlier.

== Culture ==
The Mala of Andhra Pradesh are considered a righthand community (valangai - agricultural basis), whilst the Madiga of the region are the left-hand (idangai - castes based on manufacturing, eg., leatherwork).

== Distribution ==
According to Government of India census data from 2001, Malas constituted 41.6 percent (5,139,305) of the Scheduled Castes (SC) population in the then state of Andhra Pradesh, which has subsequently been bifurcated by the creation of Telangana state.

They are also classified as a Scheduled Caste in Karnataka and Tamilnadu.

== Mala Conversion ==
A significant section of the Mala, and almost all in Coastal Andhra, turned to Christianity but after noticing the similar caste politics in the Telugu Catholic church, shifted to Protestantism instead. They are mainly prominent in the Andhra Evangelical Lutheran Church (AELC) and Church of South India (CSI).

They made good use of the Christian educational programs, elevating some of their social position and now form part of the upper middle class. These Christian Malas are commonly called Merugumala people, who came from Godavari Krishna basin. They are eligible to avail themselves of reservation under "Backward Classes -C" category with 1% reservation at state level and as Other Backward Class at the national level, although many claim no reservation and form part of the general Forward caste category.

Some have been demanding central Government to accord them SC status on par with Dalit Buddhists, Dalit Sikhs and not to discriminate them on religious grounds for being Dalit Christians. The case related to their demand is pending with the Supreme Court of India since 2005.

== See also ==
- Madiga
- Tsundur massacre
- List of Scheduled Castes in Andhra Pradesh & Telangana
