= Jasrana =

- Town
- Location in Uttar Pradesh, India Jasrana (India)
- Coordinates: 27.25°N 78.68°E
- Country: India
- State: Uttar Pradesh
- District: Firozabad
- Elevation: 169 m (554 ft)

Population (2001)
  - Total: 9,279

Languages
  - Official: Hindi
- Time zone: UTC+5:30 (IST)
- PIN: 283136
- Telephone code: 91-5671
- ISO 3166 code: IN-UP
- Vehicle registration: UP

Jasrana is a nagar panchayat (a form of an urban political unit in India comparable to a municipality) in Firozabad district in the Indian state of Uttar Pradesh

== Geography and atmosphere ==
Jasrana is located at 27.25°N 78.68°E. It has an average elevation of 169 metres (554 feet).

== Demographics ==
As of 2001 India census, Jasrana had a population of 15567. Males constitute 53% of the population and females 47%. Jasrana has an average literacy rate of 47%, In Jasrana, 16% of the population is under 6 years of age.
