= Dalit =

Marginalised castes in the Indian subcontinent

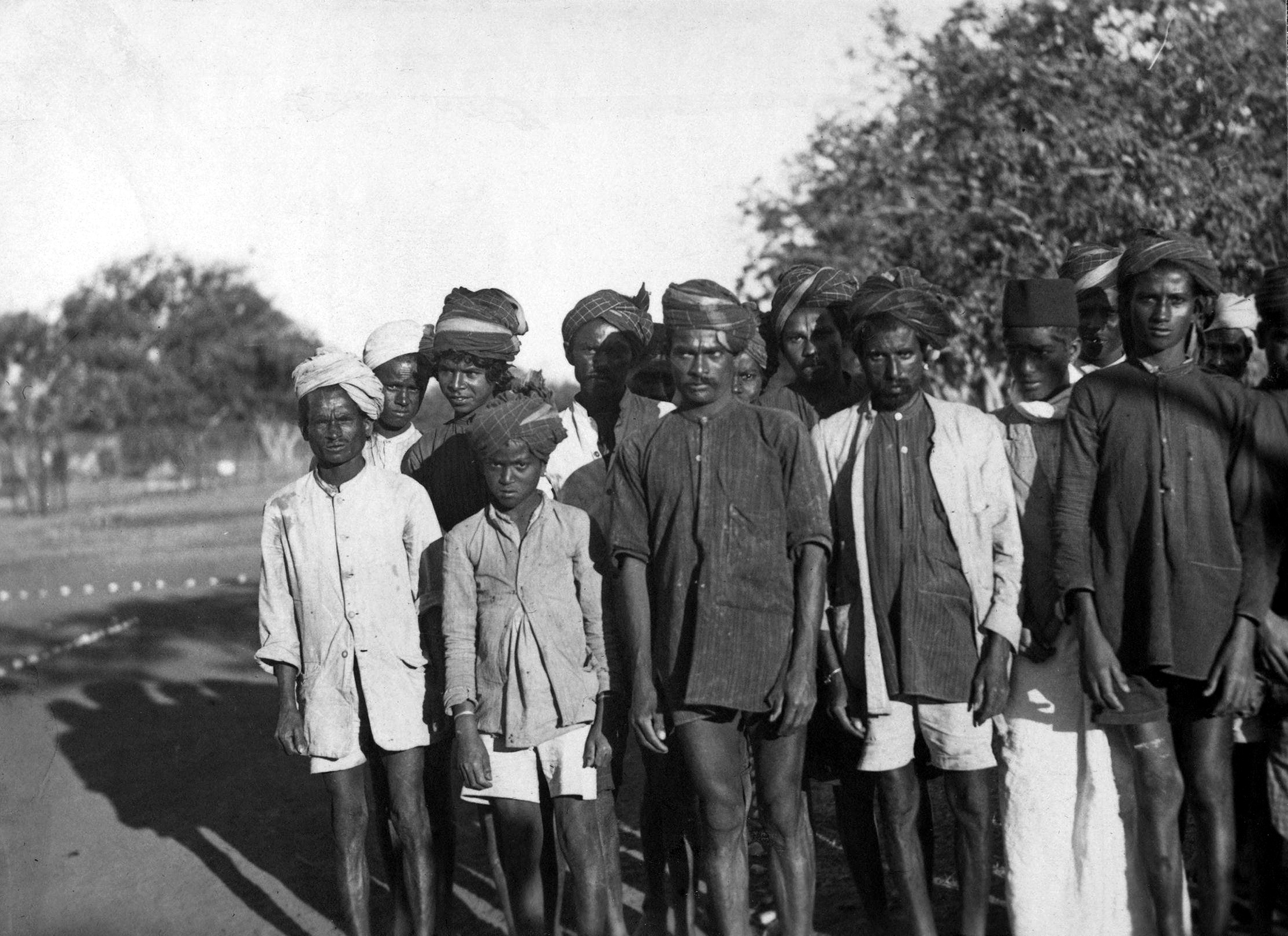
- A school of untouchables near Bangalore, by Lady Ottoline Morrell

Regions with significant populations
- India: 201.4 million (2011)
- Bangladesh: 6.5 million (2010)
- Nepal: 3.9 million (2021)
- Sri Lanka: 5 million (2011)
- Pakistan: 3 million (2011)
- United Kingdom: 500,000 (2013)
- Canada: 250,000 (2013)

Languages
- South Asian

Religion
- Hinduism; Sikhism; Buddhism; Christianity; Islam

Related ethnic groups
- Indo-Aryans, Dravidians, Mundas

Dalit (English: /ˈdælɪt/, Hindi: [d̪əlɪt̪] from Sanskrit: दलित meaning "broken/scattered"), also called Harijans (Hindi: [ɦəɾɪdʒən]) is a term used for untouchables and outcasts, who represent the lowest stratum of the castes in the Indian subcontinent. Dalits were excluded from the fourfold varna of the caste hierarchy in Hinduism and were seen as forming a fifth varna, also known by the name of Panchama.

Several scholars have drawn parallels between Dalits and the Burakumin of Japan, the Baekjeong of Korea and the peasant class of the medieval European feudal system. Dalits predominantly follow Hinduism with significant populations following Buddhism, Sikhism, Christianity, and Islam. The Constitution of India includes Dalits as one of the Scheduled Castes; this gives Dalits the right to protection, affirmative action (known as reservation in India), and official development resources.

== Terminology ==
The term Dalit is for those called the "untouchables" and others that were outside of the traditional Hindu caste hierarchy. Economist and reformer B. R. Ambedkar (1891–1956) said that untouchability came into Indian society around 400 CE, due to the struggle for supremacy between Buddhism and Brahmanism. Some Hindu priests befriended untouchables and were demoted to low-caste ranks. Eknath, who was an excommunicated Brahmin, fought for the rights of untouchables during the Bhakti period.

In the late 1880s, the Marathi word 'Dalit' was used by Jyotirao Phule for the outcasts and untouchables who were oppressed and broken in the Hindu society. Dalit is a vernacular form of the Sanskrit दलित (dalita). In Classical Sanskrit, this means "divided, split, broken, scattered". This word was repurposed in 19th-century Sanskrit to mean "(a person) not belonging to one of the four Varnas". It was perhaps first used in this sense by Pune-based social reformer Jyotirao Phule, in the context of the oppression faced by the erstwhile "untouchable" castes from other Hindus. The term Dalits was in use as a translation for the Indian census classification of Depressed Classes prior to 1935. It was popularised by Ambedkar, himself a Dalit, who included all depressed people irrespective of their caste into the definition of Dalits. It covered people who were excluded from the fourfold varna system of Hinduism and thought of themselves as forming a fifth varna, describing themselves as Panchama. In the 1970s its use was invigorated when it was adopted by the Dalit Panthers activist group.

Socio-legal scholar Oliver Mendelsohn and political economist Marika Vicziany wrote in 1998 that the term had become "intensely political ... While the use of the term might seem to express appropriate solidarity with the contemporary face of Untouchable politics, there remain major problems in adopting it as a generic term. Although the word is now quite widespread, it still has deep roots in a tradition of political radicalism inspired by the figure of B. R. Ambedkar." They went on to suggest that its use risked erroneously labelling the entire population of untouchables in India as being united by a radical politics. Anand Teltumbde also detects a trend towards denial of the politicised identity, for example among educated middle-class people who have converted to Buddhism and argue that, as Buddhists, they cannot be Dalits. This may be due to their improved circumstances giving rise to a desire not to be associated with what they perceive to be the demeaning Dalit masses.

James Lochtefeld, a professor of religion and Asian studies, said in 2002 that the "adoption and popularization of [the term Dalit] reflects their growing awareness of the situation, and their greater assertiveness in demanding their legal and constitutional rights".

=== Other terms ===
==== Official term ====
India's National Commission for Scheduled Castes considers official use of dalit as a label to be "unconstitutional" because modern legislation prefers Scheduled Castes; however, some sources say that Dalit has encompassed more communities than the official term of Scheduled Castes and is sometimes used to refer to all of India's oppressed peoples. A similar all-encompassing situation prevails in Nepal.

Scheduled Castes is the official term for Dalits in the opinion of India's National Commissions for Scheduled Castes (NCSC), who took legal advice that indicated modern legislation does not refer to Dalit and that therefore, it says, it is "unconstitutional" for official documents to do so. In 2004, the NCSC noted that some state governments used Dalits rather than Scheduled Castes in documentation and asked them to desist.

Some sources say that Dalit encompasses a broader range of communities than the official Scheduled Caste definition. It can include nomadic tribes and another official classification that also originated with the British Raj positive discrimination efforts in 1935, being the Scheduled Tribes. It is also sometimes used to refer to the entirety of India's oppressed peoples, which is the context that applies to its use in Nepalese society. An example of the limitations of the Scheduled Caste category is that, under Indian law, such people can only be followers of Buddhism, Hinduism or Sikhism, yet there are communities, who claim to be Dalit Christians and Muslims. Some additional tribal communities, which claim to be Dalit, often practise folk religions.

==== Harijan ====
In the 15th century, the term Harijan, or 'children of God', was coined by Narsinh Mehta, a Gujarati poet-saint of the Bhakti tradition, to refer to all devotees of Krishna irrespective of caste, class, or sex. Mahatma Gandhi, an admirer of Mehta's work, first used the word in the context of identifying Dalits in 1933. Ambedkar disliked the name as it placed Dalits in relation to a greater Hindu nation rather than as in an independent community like Muslims. In addition, many Dalits found, and still find, the term patronizing and derogatory, with some even claiming that the term really refers to children of devadasis. When untouchability was outlawed after Indian independence, the use of the word Harijan to describe ex-untouchables became more common among other castes than within Dalits themselves.

==== Regional terms ====
In Southern India, Dalits are sometimes known as Adi Dravida, Adi Karnataka, and Adi Andhra, which literally mean First Dravidians, Kannadigas, and Andhras, respectively. These terms were first used in 1917 by Southern Dalit leaders, who believed that they were the indigenous inhabitants of India. The terms are used in the states of Tamil Nadu, Karnataka, and Andhra Pradesh/Telangana, respectively, as a generic term for anyone from a Dalit caste.

In Maharashtra, according to historian and women's studies academic Shailaja Paik, Dalit is a term mostly used by members of the Mahar caste, into which Ambedkar was born. Most other communities prefer to use their own caste name.

In Nepal, aside from Harijan and, most commonly, Dalit, terms such as Haris (among Muslims), Achhoot, outcastes and neech jati are used.

== History ==
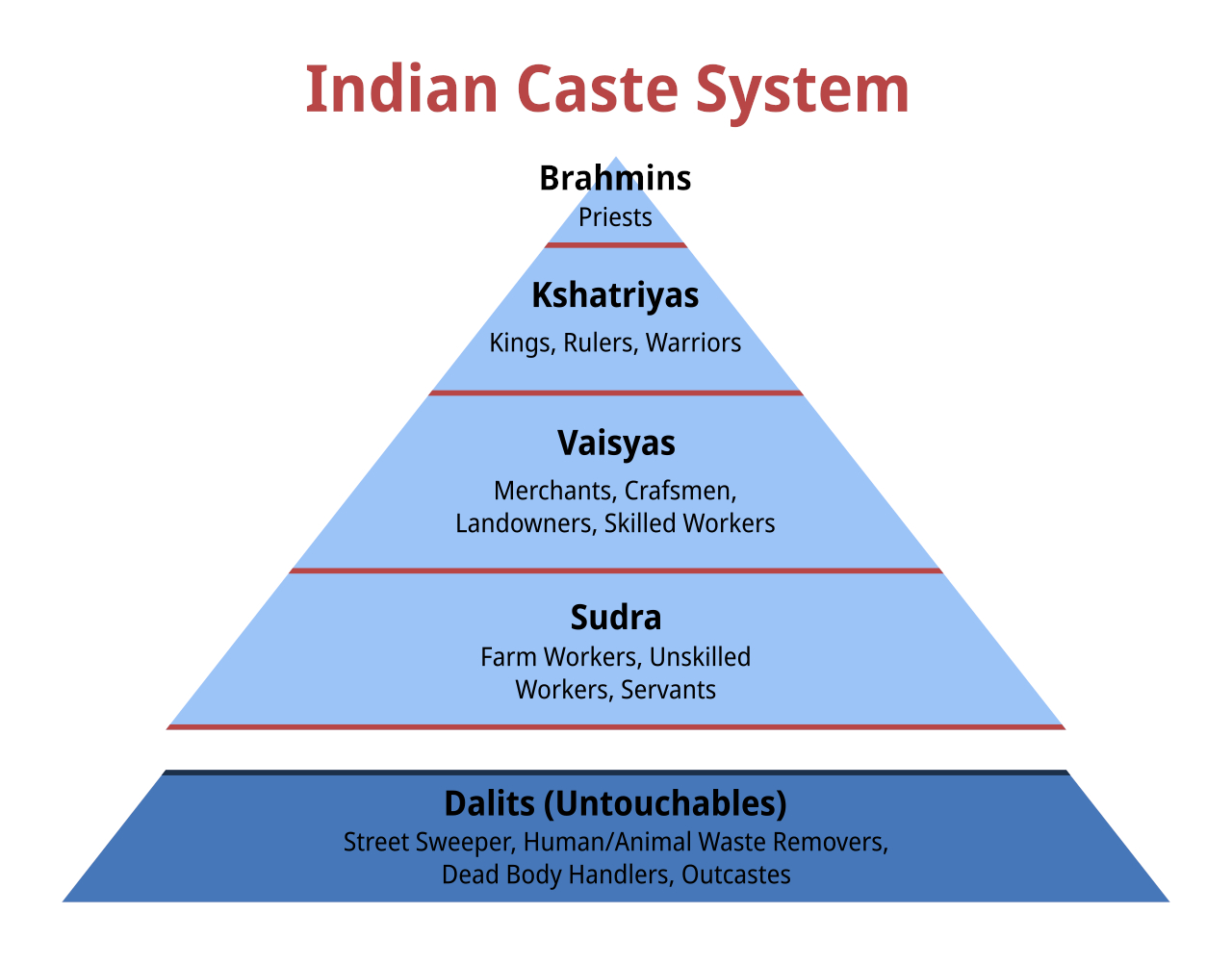
Representation of the varna system hierarchy, depicting Brahmins (priests) at the highest level and Dalits (historically marginalised as untouchables, considered outside the varna system) at the lowest stratum

Gopal Baba Walangkar (c. 1840–1900) is generally considered to be the pioneer of the Dalit movement, seeking a society in which they were not discriminated against. Another pioneer was Harichand Thakur (c. 1812–1878) with his Matua organisation that involved the Namasudra (Chandala) community in the Bengal Presidency. Ambedkar himself believed Walangkar to be the progenitor. Another early social reformer who worked to improve conditions for Dalits was Jyotirao Phule (1827–1890).

The present system has its origins in the 1932 Poona Pact between Ambedkar and Mahatma Gandhi, when Ambedkar conceded his demand that the Dalits should have an electorate separate from the caste Hindus in return for Gandhi accepting measures along these lines. The notion of a separate electorate had been proposed in the Communal Award made by the British Raj authorities, and the outcome of the Pact – the Government of India Act 1935 – introduced the new term of Scheduled Castes, as a replacement for the term Depressed Classes, and also reserved seats for them in the legislatures.

Soon after its independence in 1947, India introduced a reservation system to enhance the ability of Dalits to have political representation and to obtain government jobs and education. The 1950 Constitution of India included measures to improve the socio-economic conditions of Dalits. Aside from banning untouchability, these included the reservation system, a means of positive discrimination that created the classification of Scheduled Castes as Dalits. Communities that were categorised as being one of those groups were guaranteed a percentage of the seats in the national and state legislatures, as well as in government jobs and places of education.

By 1995, of all federal government jobs in India – 10.1 per cent of Class I, 12.7 per cent of Class II, 16.2 per cent of Class III, and 27.2 per cent of Class IV jobs were held by Dalits. Of the most senior jobs in government agencies and government-controlled enterprises, only 1 per cent were held by Dalits, not much change in 40 years. In the 21st century, Dalits have been elected to India's highest judicial and political offices. In 1997, India elected its first Dalit President, K. R. Narayanan. Many social organisations have promoted better conditions for Dalits through education, healthcare and employment. Nonetheless, while caste-based discrimination was prohibited and untouchability abolished by the Constitution of India, such practices are still widespread. To prevent harassment, assault, discrimination and similar acts against these groups, the Government of India enacted the Prevention of Atrocities Act, also called the SC/ST Act, on 31 March 1995.

In accordance with the order of the Bombay High Court, the Information and Broadcasting Ministry (I&B Ministry) of the Government of India issued an advisory to all media channels in September 2018, asking them to use "Scheduled Castes" instead of the word "Dalit".

== Demographics ==
Scheduled Castes distribution in India by state and union territory according to the 2011 Census of India. Punjab had the highest proportion of its population as SC (around 32%), while India's island territories and two northeastern states had approximately zero.

Scheduled Caste communities exist across India and comprised 16.6% of the country's population, according to the 2011 Census of India. Uttar Pradesh (21%), West Bengal (11%), Bihar (8%) and Tamil Nadu (7%) between them accounted for almost half the country's total Scheduled Caste population. They were most prevalent as a proportion of the states' population in Punjab, at about 32 per cent, while Mizoram had the lowest at approximately zero.

Similar groups are found throughout the rest of the Indian subcontinent; less than 2 per cent of Pakistan's population are Hindu and 70–75 per cent of those Hindus are Dalits. Dalits are found in Nepal, in Bangladesh, which had 5 million Dalits in 2010 with the majority being landless and in chronic poverty, and in Sri Lanka. They are also found as part of the Indian diaspora in many countries, including the United States, United Kingdom, Singapore, and the Caribbean. While discrimination against Dalits has declined in urban areas and in the public sphere, it still exists in rural areas and in the private sphere, in everyday matters such as access to eating places, schools, temples and water sources. Some Dalits successfully integrated into urban Indian society, where caste origins are less obvious. In rural India, however, caste origins are more readily apparent and Dalits often remain excluded from local religious life, though some qualitative evidence suggests that exclusion is diminishing.

India is home to over 200 million Dalits. According to Paul Diwakar, a Dalit activist from the National Campaign on Dalit Human Rights, "India has 600,000 villages and almost every village a small pocket on the outskirts is meant for Dalits."

== Socioeconomic status and discrimination ==
Persecution and discrimination against Dalits has been observed across South Asia and among the South Asian diaspora. In 2001, the quality of life of the Dalit population in India was worse than that of the overall Indian population on metrics such as access to health care, life expectancy, education attainability, access to drinking water and housing. According to a 2007 report by Human Rights Watch (HRW), the treatment of Dalits has been like a "hidden apartheid" and that they "endure segregation in housing, schools, and access to public services". HRW noted that Manmohan Singh, then Prime Minister of India, saw a parallel between the apartheid system and untouchability. Eleanor Zelliot also notes Singh's 2006 comment but says that, despite the obvious similarities, race prejudice and the situation of Dalits "have a different basis and perhaps a different solution". Though the Indian Constitution abolished untouchability, the oppressed status of Dalits remains a reality. In rural India, stated Klaus Klostermaier in 2010, "they still live in secluded quarters, do the dirtiest work, and are not allowed to use the village well and other common facilities". In the same year, Zelliot noted that "In spite of much progress over the last sixty years, Dalits are still at the social and economic bottom of society."

According to the 2014 NCAER/University of Maryland survey, 27 per cent of the Indian population still practices untouchability; the figure may be higher because many people refuse to acknowledge doing so when questioned, although the methodology of the survey was also criticised for potentially inflating the figure. Across India, Untouchability was practised among 52 per cent of Brahmins, 33 per cent of Other Backward Classes and 24 per cent of non-Brahmin forward castes. Untouchability was also practised by people of minority religions – 23 per cent of Sikhs, 18 per cent of Muslims and 5 per cent of Christians. According to statewide data, Untouchability is most commonly practised in Madhya Pradesh (53 per cent), followed by Himachal Pradesh (50 per cent), Chhattisgarh (48 per cent), Rajasthan and Bihar (47 per cent), Uttar Pradesh (43 per cent), and Uttarakhand (40 per cent).

Examples of segregation have included the Madhya Pradesh village of Ghatwani, where the Scheduled Tribe population of Bhilala do not allow Dalit villagers to use the public borewell for fetching water and thus they are forced to drink dirty water. In metropolitan areas around New Delhi and Bangalore, Dalits and Muslims face discrimination from upper caste landlords when seeking places to rent. In Southern India public tea shops follow a two tumbler system where the owner maintains a second set of cups for serving tea to Dalits.

In 1855, Mutka Salve, a 14-year-old student of Dalit leader Savitribai Phule, wrote that during the rule of Baji Rao of the Maratha Empire, the Dalit castes were chased away from their lands to build large buildings. They were also forced to drink oil mixed with red lead causing them to die, and then they were buried in the foundations of buildings, thus wiping out generations of Dalits. Under the rule of Baji Rao, if a Dalit crossed in front of a gym, they would cut off his head and play "bat and ball" on the ground, with their swords as bats and his head as a ball. Under these 17th century kings, human sacrifice of untouchable persons was not unusual. They also created intricate rules and operations to ensure that they stayed untouchables. George Kunnath claims that there "is and has been an internal hierarchy between the various Dalit castes". According to Kunnath, the Dusadhs are considered the highest while the Musahars are considered the lowest within the Dalit groups.

=== Education ===
According to an analysis by The IndiaGoverns Research Institute, Dalits constituted nearly half of primary school drop-outs in Karnataka during the period 2012–14. A sample survey in 2014, conducted by Dalit Adhikar Abhiyan and funded by ActionAid, found that among state schools in Madhya Pradesh, 88 per cent discriminated against Dalit children. In 79 per cent of the schools studied Dalit children are forbidden from touching mid-day meals. They are required to sit separately at lunch in 35 per cent of schools and are required to eat with specially marked plates in 28 per cent.

There have been incidents and allegations of SC and ST teachers and professors being discriminated against and harassed by authorities, upper castes colleagues and upper caste students in different education institutes of India. In some cases, such as in Gujarat, state governments have argued that, far from being discriminatory, their rejection when applying for jobs in education has been because there are no suitably qualified candidates from those classifications.

=== Poverty ===
According to a 2014 report to the Ministry of Minority Affairs, 33.8 per cent of Scheduled Caste (SC) populations in rural India were living below the poverty line in 2011–12. In urban areas, 21.8 per cent of SC populations were below the poverty line. A 2012 survey by Mangalore University in Karnataka found that 93 per cent of Dalit families in the state of Karnataka live below the poverty line.

Some Dalits have achieved affluence, although most remain poor. Some Dalit intellectuals, such as Chandra Bhan Prasad, have argued that the living standards of many Dalits have improved since the economic system became more liberalised starting in 1991 and have supported their claims through large surveys. According to the Socio Economic and Caste Census 2011, nearly 79 per cent of Adivasi households and 73 per cent of Dalit households were the most deprived among rural households in India. While 45 per cent of SC households are landless and earn a living by manual casual labour, the figure is 30 per cent for Adivasis.

=== Occupations ===
In the past, they were believed to be so impure that upper-caste Hindus considered their presence to be polluting. The "impure status" was related to their historic hereditary occupations that caste Hindus considered to be "polluting" or debased, such as working with leather, disposing of dead animals, manual scavenging, or sanitation work, which in much of India means collection & disposal of faeces from latrines.

Forced by the circumstances of their birth and poverty, some Dalit communities in India continue to work as sanitation workers: manual scavengers, cleaners of drains and sewers, garbage collectors, and sweepers of roads. As of 2019, an estimated 40 to 60 per cent of the 6 million Dalit households are engaged in sanitation work. The most common Dalit caste performing sanitation work is Valmiki (also Balmiki) caste. Others work as landless laborers, marginalized farmers, or continue in their traditional roles such as leathercraft, tanning, cobbling, and the disposal of dead animals.

=== Healthcare and nutrition ===
Discrimination against Dalits exists in access to healthcare and nutrition. A sample survey of Dalits, conducted over several months in Madhya Pradesh and funded by ActionAid in 2014, found that health field workers did not visit 65 per cent of Dalit settlements. 47 per cent of Dalits were not allowed entry into ration shops, and 64 per cent were given fewer grains than non-Dalits. In Haryana state, 49 per cent of Dalit children under five years were underweight and malnourished while 80 per cent of those in the 6–59 months age group were anaemic in 2015.

=== Crime ===
Dalits comprise a slightly disproportionate number of India's prison inmates. While Dalits (including both SCs and STs) constitute 25 per cent of the Indian population, they account for 33.2 per cent of prisoners. About 24.5 per cent of death row inmates in India are from Scheduled Castes and Scheduled Tribes which is proportionate to their population. The percentage is highest in Maharashtra (50 per cent), Karnataka (36.4 per cent) and Madhya Pradesh (36 per cent). Dalits have been arrested on false pretexts. According to Human Rights Watch, politically motivated arrests of Dalit rights activists occur and those arrested can be detained for six months without charge.

Caste-related violence between Dalit and non-Dalits stems from ongoing prejudice by upper caste members. The Bhagana rape case, which arose out of a dispute of allocation of land, is an example of atrocities against Dalit girls and women. In August 2015, due to continued alleged discrimination from upper castes of the village, about 100 Dalit inhabitants converted to Islam in a ceremony at Jantar Mantar, New Delhi. Inter-caste marriage has been proposed as a remedy, but according to a 2014 survey of 42,000 households by the New Delhi-based National Council of Applied Economic Research (NCAER) and the University of Maryland, it was estimated that only 5 per cent of Indian marriages cross caste boundaries.

The latest data available from India's National Crime Records Bureau is from the year 2000. In that year a total of 25,455 crimes against Dalits were committed; 2 Dalits were assaulted every hour, and in each day 3 Dalit women were raped, 2 Dalits were murdered, and 2 Dalit homes were set on fire. Amnesty International documented a high number of sexual assaults against Dalit women, which were often committed by landlords, upper-caste villagers, and policemen, according to a study published in 2001. According to the research, only about 5% of assaults are recorded, and police dismiss at least 30% of rape reports as false. The study also discovered that police often seek bribes, threaten witnesses, and conceal evidence. Victims of rape have also been killed. There have been some reports of Dalits being forced to eat human faeces and drink urine by upper caste members in some villages. In one such instance, a 17-year-old girl was set on fire by Yadav (an OBC) youth, allegedly because she was allowed school-education. In September 2015, a 45-year-old Dalit woman was allegedly stripped naked and forced to drink urine by perpetrators in Madhya Pradesh. In some villages of India, there have been allegations that Dalit grooms riding horses for wedding ceremonies have been beaten up and ostracised by upper caste people. In August 2015, upper caste people burned houses and vehicles belonging to Dalit families and slaughtered their livestock in reaction to Dalits daring to hold a temple car procession at a village in Tamil Nadu. In August 2015, it was claimed that a Jat Khap Panchayat ordered the rape of two Dalit sisters because their brother eloped with a married Jat girl of the same village. In 2003, the higher caste Muslims in Bihar opposed the burials of lower caste Muslims in the same graveyard. A Dalit activist was killed in 2020 for social media posts criticising Brahmins. A Dalit was killed in 2019 for eating in front of upper-caste men.

=== Prevention of Atrocities Act ===
The Government of India has attempted on several occasions to legislate specifically to address the issue of caste-related violence that affects SCs and STs. Aside from the Constitutional abolition of untouchability, there has been the Untouchability (Offences) Act of 1955, which was amended in the same year to become the Protection of Civil Rights Act. It was determined that neither of those Acts were effective, so the Scheduled Caste and Scheduled Tribe (Prevention of Atrocities) Act of 1989 (POA) came into force.

The POA designated specific crimes against SCs and STs as "atrocities" – a criminal act that has "the quality of being shockingly cruel and inhumane" – which should be prosecuted under its terms rather than existing criminal law. It created corresponding punishments. Its purpose was to curb and punish violence against Dalits, including humiliations such as the forced consumption of noxious substances. Other atrocities included forced labour, denial of access to water and other public amenities, and sexual abuse. The Act permitted Special Courts exclusively to try POA cases. The Act called on states with high levels of caste violence (said to be "atrocity-prone") to appoint qualified officers to monitor and maintain law and order.

In 2015, the Parliament of India passed the Scheduled Castes and Scheduled Tribes (Prevention of Atrocities) Amendment Act to address issues regarding the implementation of the POA, including instances where the police put procedural obstacles in the way of alleged victims or indeed outright colluded with the accused. It also extended the number of acts that were deemed to be atrocities. One of those remedies, in an attempt to address the slow process of cases, was to make it mandatory for states to set up the exclusive Special Courts that the POA had delineated. Progress in doing so, however, was reported in April 2017 to be unimpressive. P. L. Punia, a former chairman of the NCSC, said that the number of pending cases was high because most of the extant Special Courts were not exclusive but rather being used to process some non-POA cases, and because "The special prosecutors are not bothered and the cases filed under this Act are as neglected as the victims". While Dalit rights organisations were cautiously optimistic that the amended Act would improve the situation, legal experts were pessimistic.

== Religion ==
Discrimination is illegal under Indian law by the Removal of Civil Disabilities Act (Act 21 of 1938), the Temple Entry Authorization and Indemnity Act 1939 (Act XXII of 1939) and Article 17 of the Constitution which outlawed Untouchability. After India's independence in 1947, secular nationalism based on a "composite culture" made all people equal citizens.

=== Hinduism ===
Most Dalits in India are Hindu. There have been incidents which showed that Dalits were restricted from entering temples by high-caste Hindus, and participation in religious processions.

In the 19th century, the Brahmo Samaj, Arya Samaj and the Ramakrishna Mission actively participated in the rights of Dalits. While Dalits had places to worship, the first upper-caste temple to openly welcome Dalits was the Laxminarayan Temple in Wardha in 1928. It was followed by the Temple Entry Proclamation issued by the last King of Travancore in the Indian state of Kerala in 1936.

In the 1930s, Gandhi and Ambedkar disagreed regarding the retention of the Varna system. Whilst Ambedkar wanted to see it destroyed, Gandhi thought that it could be modified by reinterpreting Hindu texts so that the untouchables were absorbed into the Shudra varna. It was this disagreement that led to the Poona Pact. Gandhi began the Harijan Yatra to help the Dalits, but ran into some opposition from Dalits that wanted a complete break from Hinduism.

The declaration by princely states of Kerala between 1936 and 1947 that temples were open to all Hindus went a long way towards ending untouchability there. However, educational opportunities for Dalits in Kerala remain limited.

Other Hindu groups attempted to reconcile with the Dalit community. Hindu temples are increasingly receptive to Dalit priests, a function formerly reserved for Brahmins. Brahmins such as Subramania Bharati passed Brahminhood onto a Dalit, while in Shivaji's Maratha Empire Dalit warriors joined his forces. However, in the 19th century, Dalits in the Mahar Regiment of British Bombay, defeated the oppressive rule of the Peshvas.

The fight for temple entry rights for Dalits continues to cause controversy. In a 2015 incident in Meerut, a Dalit belonging to the Valmiki caste was denied entry to a Hindu temple; he went on to convert to Islam. In September 2015, four Dalit women were fined by the upper-caste Hindus for entering a temple in Karnataka.

There have been allegations that Dalits in Nepal are denied entry to Hindu temples. In at least one case, Dalits were reportedly beaten by upper-caste people while attempting to enter a local temple.

=== Buddhism ===
In 1956, the Dalit jurist Bhimrao Ramji Ambedkar (1891–1956) launched the Dalit Buddhist movement, leading several mass conversions of Dalits from Hinduism to Buddhism. Ambedkar's Buddhism is a new kind of Buddhism that focuses on social and political engagement. About half a million Dalits joined Ambedkar in rejecting Hinduism and challenging its caste system. The movement is centered in Maharashtra, and according to the 2011 census, there were 6.5 million Marathi Buddhists (mainly Dalit Buddhists) in Maharashtra.

Another Dalit Buddhist leader and reformer was Pandit Iyothee Thass, founder of the Sakya Buddhist Society of Tamil Nadu. The Scheduled Castes Order (Amendment) Act, 1990 granted reservation to Dalit Buddhists and recognized their Scheduled Caste status.

=== Sikhism ===
Guru Nanak in Guru Granth Sahib calls for everyone to treat each other equally. Subsequent Sikh Gurus, all of whom came from the Khatri caste, also denounced the hierarchy of the caste system. Despite this, social stratification exists in the Sikh community. The bulk of the Sikhs of Punjab belong to the Jat caste; there are also two Dalit Sikh castes in the state, called the Mazhabis and the Ramdasias.

Surinder S. Jodhka says that, in practice, Sikhs belonging to the landowning dominant castes have not shed all their prejudices against the Dalit castes. While Dalits would be allowed entry into the village gurudwaras they would not be permitted to cook or serve langar (the communal meal). Therefore, wherever they could mobilise resources, the Sikh Dalits of Punjab have tried to construct their gurudwara and other local-level institutions to attain a certain degree of cultural autonomy. In 1953, Sikh leader Master Tara Singh succeeded in winning the demands from the government to include Sikh castes of the converted untouchables in the list of scheduled castes. In the Shiromani Gurdwara Prabandhak Committee (SGPC), 20 of the 140 seats are reserved for low-caste Sikhs.

Sikh women are required to have the surname "Kaur", and men, the surname "Singh", to eradicate caste identities and discrimination.

In 2003 the Talhan village Gurudwara endured a bitter dispute between Jat Sikhs and Chamars. The Chamars came out in force and confronted the Randhawa and Bains Jat Sikh landlords, who refused to give the Chamars a share on the governing committee of a shrine dedicated to Shaheed Baba Nihal Singh. The shrine earned 3–7 crore Indian Rupees, and the Jat Sikh landlord allegedly "gobbled up a substantial portion of the offerings". Though Dalits form more than 60 per cent of Talhan's 5,000-strong population, local traditions ensured that they were denied a place on the committee. The landlords, in league with radical Sikh organisations and the SGPC, attempted to keep out the Dalits by razing the shrine overnight and constructing a gurdwara on it, but the Dalit quest for a say in the governing committee did not end.

Chamars fought a four-year court battle with the landlords and their allies, including the Punjab Police. In that time Jats conducted several boycotts against the Chamars. The Jat Sikhs and their allies cut off the power supply to their homes. In addition, various scuffles and fights set Chamar youths armed with lathis, rocks, bricks, soda bottles and anything they could find fought Jat Sikh landlords, youths and the Punjab police. Dalit youngsters painted their homes and motorcycles with the slogan, Putt Chamar De (proud sons of Chamars) in retaliation to the Jat slogan, Putt Jattan De.

=== Jainism ===
Historically Jainism was practised by many communities across India. They are often conservative and are generally considered upper-caste.

In 1958, a Sthanakvasi Jain called Muni Sameer Muni came into contact with members of the Khatik community in the Udaipur region, who decided to adopt Jainism. Their centre, Ahimsa Nagar, located about four miles from Chittorgarh, was inaugurated by Mohanlal Sukhadia in 1966. Sameer Muni termed them Veerwaal, that is, belonging to Mahavira. A 22-year-old youth, Chandaram Meghwal, was initiated as a Jain monk in Ahore town in Jalore district in 2005. In 2010 a Mahar engineer called Vishal Damodar was initiated as a Jain monk by Acharya Navaratna Sagar Suriji at Samet Shikhar. Acharya Nanesh, the eighth Achayra of Sadhumargi Jain Shravak Sangha, had preached among the Balai community in 1963 near Ratlam. His followers are called Dharmapal. In 1984, some of the Bhangis of Jodhpur came under the influence of Acharya Shri Tulsi and adopted Jainism.

=== Christianity ===
Christian Dalits are found in India, Pakistan, Bangladesh, and Nepal.

Mass conversions of lower caste Hindus to Christianity took place in order to escape the discrimination. The main Dalit groups that participated in these conversions were the Chuhras of Punjab, Chamars of North India (Uttar Pradesh, Bihar and Madhya Pradesh), Vankars of Gujarat, and Pulayas of Kerala. The first people converted to Christianity by Jesuits of the Madura Mission were members of Nadars, Maravars, and Pallar. They believed that "Christianity is a true religion; a desire for protection from oppressors and, if possible, material aid; the desire for education for their children; and the knowledge that those who have become Christians had improved".

Christianity was thought to be egalitarian and could provide mobility away from the caste. Sometimes the only change seen was their religious identity. Even after conversion, in some cases, Dalits were discriminated against due to the "residual leftover" practice of caste discrimination from their previous traditions. This is attributed to the predominantly Hindu society they lived in. Discrimination against Dalit Christians also remained in interactions and mannerisms between castes; for example, during the earlier days, the 'lower caste Christians' had to [cover] their mouths when talking to a Syrian Christian. In many cases they were still referred to by their Hindu caste names: For example Pulayans in Kerala, Pariah in Tamil Nadu, and Madigas in Andhra Pradesh, by members of all religious backgrounds.

Even after conversion, to some extent segregation, restriction, hierarchy, and graded ritual purity remained. Data show that there is more discrimination and less class mobility among the people living in rural areas, where incidents of caste discrimination are higher among people from all religious backgrounds. In many cases, the churches referred to the Dalits as 'New Christians'. It is alleged to be a derogatory term which classifies the Dalit Christians to be looked down upon by other Christians. During the earlier days of Christianity, in some churches in south India, the Dalits had either separate seating or had to attend the mass outside. Dalit Christians are also said to be grossly underrepresented amongst the clergy in some places.

Caste-based occupations held by Dalits also show a clear segregation which perpetuated even after becoming Christian. Occupational patterns (including manual scavenging) are prevalent among Dalit Christians in north-west India are said to be quite similar to those of Dalit Hindus. Occupational discrimination for Dalit Christians goes so far as to restrict not only employment but in some cases for clean sanitation and water.

=== Islam ===
"Most of India's 140 million Muslims are descended from local converts. Many of them converted to Islam to escape Hindu upper-caste oppression," according to Soutik Biswas on the BBC in 2016. 75% of the present Indian Muslim population are Dalits.

== Political involvement ==
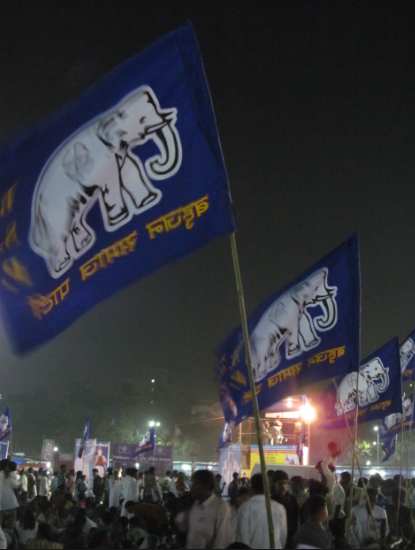
Bahujan Samaj Party (BSP) is an Indian Dalit party.

Dalit-led political parties include:

=== National Dalit-led political parties in India ===
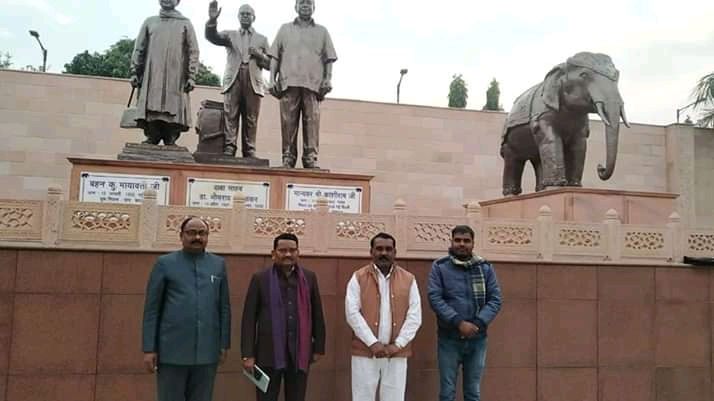
Dalit leaders at Bahujan Samaj Party head office

- Bahujan Samaj Party, a national political party as per Election Commission of India
- Azad Samaj Party
- Dalit League

=== Other recognized state political parties ===
- Azad Samaj Party
- Vanchit Bahujan Aaghadi, led by Prakash Yashwant Ambedkar, Ambedkar's grandson
- Republican Party of India factions, active in Maharashtra
- Viduthalai Chiruthaigal Katchi is the major Dalit party in Tamil Nadu
- Lok Janshakti Party, Bihar

=== Nepali Dalit-led parties ===
- Bahujan Shakti Party, Nepal
- Dalit Janajati Party, Nepal

=== Dalit-led political parties in Pakistan ===
- Dalit Sujag Tehreek, Pakistan

=== Other dalit groups ===
Anti-Dalit prejudices exist in groups such as the extremist militia Ranvir Sena, largely run by upper-caste landlords in Bihar. They oppose equal treatment of Dalits and have resorted to violence. The Ranvir Sena is considered a terrorist organisation by the government of India. In 2015, Cobrapost exposed many leaders especially like C. P. Thakur alongside former PM Chandra Shekhar associated with Ranvir Sena in Bihar Dalit massacres while governments of Nitish Kumar (under pressure from BJP), Lalu Prasad Yadav and Rabri Devi did nothing to get justice for Dalits.

The rise of Hindutva's (Hindu nationalism) role in Indian politics has accompanied allegations that religious conversions of Dalits are due to allurements like education and jobs rather than faith. Critics argue that laws banning conversion and limiting social relief for converts mean that conversion impedes economic success. However, Bangaru Laxman, a Dalit politician, was a prominent member of the Hindutva movement.

Another political issue is Dalit affirmative-action quotas in government jobs and university admissions. About 8 per cent of the seats in the National and State Parliaments are reserved for Scheduled Caste and Tribe candidates.

Jagjivan Ram (1908–1986) was the first scheduled caste leader to emerge at the national level from Bihar. He was member of the Constituent assembly that drafted India's constitution. Ram also served in the interim national government of 1946 He served in the cabinets of Congress party Prime ministers Jawaharlal Nehru, Lal Bahadur Shastri and Indira Gandhi. His last position in government was as Deputy Prime Minister of India in the Janata Party government of 1977–1979,

In modern times several Bharatiya Janata Party leaders were Dalits, including Dinanath Bhaskar, Ramchandra Veerappa and Suraj Bhan.

In India's most populous state, Uttar Pradesh, Dalits have had a major political impact. The Dalit-led Bahujan Samaj Party (BSP) had previously run the government and that party's leader, Mayawati, served several times as chief minister. Regarding her election in 2007, some reports claimed her victory was due to her ability to win support from both 17 per cent of Muslims and nearly 17 per cent Brahmins alongside 80 per cent of Dalits. However, surveys of voters on the eve of elections, indicated that caste loyalties were not the voters' principal concern. Instead, inflation and other issues of social and economic development dictated the outcome. Mayawati's success in reaching across castes has led to speculation about her as a potential future Prime Minister of India.

Aside from Mayawati in Uttar Pradesh, Damodaram Sanjivayya was chief minister of Andhra Pradesh from 11 January 1960 to 12 March 1962, and Jitan Ram Manjhi was chief minister of Bihar for just under a year. In 1997, K. R. Narayanan, who was a Dalit, was elected as President of India. In 2017, Ramnath Kovind was elected as the President of India, becoming the second dalit president of the country.

=== Votebank ===
Votebank politics are common in India, usually based on religion or caste. Indeed, the term itself was coined by the Indian sociologist M. N. Srinivas. Dalits are often used as a votebank. There have been instances where it has been alleged that an election-winning party reneged on promises made to the Dalits made during the election campaign or have excluded them from party affairs.

=== Scheduled Castes and Scheduled Tribes Sub-Plan ===
The SC, ST Sub-Plan, or Indiramma Kalalu, is a budget allocation by the Government of Andhra Pradesh for the welfare of Dalits. The law was enacted in May 2013. SCs and STs have separate panels for spending. The plan was meant to prevent the government from diverting funds meant for SCs and STs to other programs, which was historically the case. As of 2013, no equivalent national plan existed. Scheduled Castes Sub Plan and Tribal Sub-Plan funds are often diverted by state governments to other purposes.

While the Indian Constitution has provisions for the social and economic uplift of Dalits to support their upward social mobility, these concessions are limited to Hindus. Dalits who have converted to other religions have asked that benefits be extended to them.

== Beyond the Indian subcontinent ==
=== United Kingdom ===
After World War II, immigration from the former British Empire was largely driven by labour shortages. Like the rest of the Indian subcontinent diaspora, Dalits immigrated and established their own communities.

A 2009 report alleged that caste discrimination is "rife" in the United Kingdom. The report alleged that casteism persists in the workplace and within the National Health Service and at doctor's offices.

Some claim that caste discrimination is non-existent. Some have rejected the government's right to interfere in the community. The Hindu Forum of Britain conducted their own research, concluding that caste discrimination was "not endemic in British society", reports to the contrary aimed to increase discrimination by legislating expression and behaviour and that barriers should instead be removed through education.

A 2010 study found that caste discrimination occurs in Britain at work and in service provision. While not ruling out the possibility of discrimination in education, no such incidents were uncovered. The report found favourable results from educational activities. However, non-legislative approaches were claimed to be less effective in the workplace and would not help when the authorities were discriminating. One criticism of discrimination law was the difficulty in obtaining proof of violations. Perceived benefits of legislation were that it provides redress, leads to greater understanding and reduces the social acceptance of such discrimination.

More recent studies in Britain were inconclusive and found that discrimination was "not religion specific and is subscribed to by members of any or no religion". Equalities Minister Helen Grant found insufficient evidence to justify specific legislation, while Shadow Equalities minister Kate Green said that the impact is on a relatively small number of people. Religious studies professor Gavin Flood of the Oxford Centre for Hindu Studies concluded that the Hindu community in Britain is particularly well integrated, loosening caste ties. Casteist beliefs were prevalent mainly among first-generation immigrants, with such prejudices declining with each successive generation due to greater assimilation.

From September 2013 to February 2014, Indian philosopher Meena Dhanda led a project on 'Caste in Britain' for the UK Equality and Human Rights Commission (EHRC), which focused on the proposed inclusion of a provision in the Equality Act 2010 to protect British citizens against caste discrimination. In 2018 the UK government decided not to include caste as a "protected characteristic" within the terms of the Act, and to rely instead on case law to identify tests for caste-based discrimination.

Supporters of anti-caste legislation include Lord Avebury and Lady Thornton.

==== Sikh diaspora in Britain ====
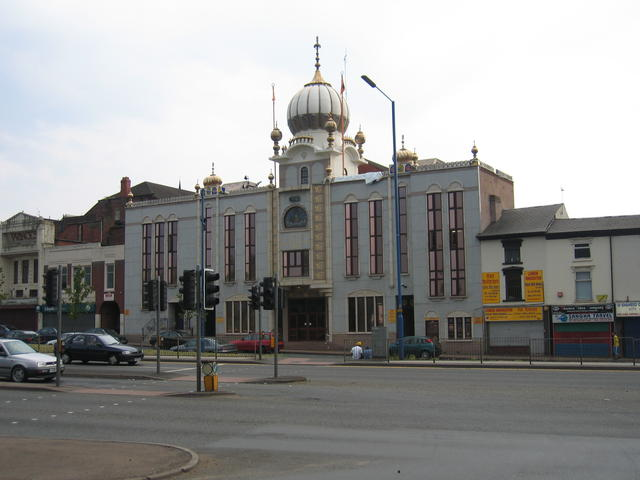
A Sikh gurdwara in Smethwick. The majority of gurdwaras in Britain are caste-based and one can indirectly inquire about a person's caste based upon which gurdwara the person attends.

Sikhs in the United Kingdom are affected by caste. Gurdwaras such as those of the Ramgarhia Sikhs are organised along caste lines and most are controlled by a single caste. In most British towns and cities with a significant Sikh population, rival gurdwaras can be found with caste-specific management committees. The caste system and caste identity is entrenched and reinforced.

The few gurdwaras that accept inter-caste marriages do so reluctantly. Gurdwaras may insist on the presence of Singh and Kaur in the names of the bridegroom and bride, or deny them access to gurdwara-based religious services and community centres.

=== In the Caribbean ===
It is estimated that in 1883, about one-third of the immigrants who arrived in the Caribbean were Dalits. The shared experience of being exploited in a foreign land gradually broke down caste barriers in the Caribbean Hindu communities.

=== In Continental Europe ===
The Romani people, originating in northern India, are said to be of Dalit ancestry. Between 1001 and 1026, the Romani fought under their Hindu rulers to fight the Ghaznavids.

=== In the United States ===
Many Dalits first came to the United States to flee caste-based oppression in South Asia. After the Chinese Exclusion Act of 1882, the demand for labourers brought in many caste-diverse South Asian immigrants, many of whom were Dalit. After the 1965 Immigration and Naturalization Act, immigrants from India were primarily professionals and students, largely from upper caste or dominant caste families. However, from the 1990s onwards, many more of the skilled professionals arriving from India have been Dalit, due to multiple generations of affirmative action policies in India, as well as ongoing efforts of organised resistance against caste discrimination.

In 2018, Equality Labs released a report on "Caste in the United States". This report found that one in two Dalit Americans live in fear of their caste being "outed". In addition, 60% have experienced caste-based discriminatory jokes, and 25% have suffered verbal or physical assault because of their caste.

In late June 2020, the California Department of Fair Employment and Housing filed a lawsuit against Cisco Systems, alleging that a Dalit engineer at the company faced discrimination from two of his upper-caste supervisors for his Dalit background. The lawsuit claims that "higher caste supervisors and co-workers imported the discriminatory system's practices into their team and Cisco's workplace". In 2023, the California Civil Rights Department voluntarily dismissed its case alleging caste discrimination against two Cisco engineers, while still keeping alive its litigation against Cisco Systems. The CRD was later symbolically fined $2000 for their case against the two engineers and CISCO.

== Literature ==
Dalit literature encompasses writings by Dalits about their lived experiences, and it has emerged as a significant literary movement and forms a distinct part of Indian literature. It has formed an identity across various Indian languages, including Marathi, Bangla, Hindi, Kannada, Punjabi, Sindhi, Odia, Tamil, and others. The earliest identifiably Dalit writers were Madara Chennaiah, an 11th-century cobbler-saint who lived in the reign of Western Chalukyas and who is regarded by some scholars as the "father of Vachana poetry" and Dohara Kakkaiah, a Dalit by birth, six of whose confessional poems survive. The origins of modern Dalit writing can be traced back to the works of Marathi Dalit Bhakti poets and Tamil Siddhas, suggesting a long-standing tradition of marginalized voices. This literary movement gained momentum in the mid-20th century, challenging the prevailing portrayals of life in mainstream literature. The publication of Jyotirao Phule's Gulamgiri in 1873 marked a seminal moment in Dalit literature, shedding light on the plight of the Untouchables.

Dalit literature in India has flourished in various regional languages, reflecting the diverse experiences and struggles of Dalit communities across the country. In Maharashtra, Baburao Bagul's collection of stories, "Jevha Mi Jat Chorali" (When I had Concealed My Caste), published in 1963, marked a significant turning point, portraying the harsh realities of Dalit lives and garnering critical acclaim. Writers like Namdeo Dhasal and Daya Pawar further strengthened the Dalit movement in Maharashtra introducing the seminal "Dalit Panther" as part of the little magazine movement. Baburao Bagul, Bandhu Madhav and Shankar Rao Kharat, worked in the 1960s. Later the little magazine movement became popular. In Bengal, the Dalit literary movement began in 1992 after the suicide of Chuni Kotal, leading to the formation of the Bangla Dalit Sahitya Sanstha and the launch of the magazine "Chaturtha Duniya". Prominent Dalit authors in Bengal include Manoranjan Byapari, Jatin Bala, and Kalyani Charal. Tamil Nadu has a long history of Dalit literature, starting from the efforts of Parayars in the late 19th century. The Tamil Dalit literary movement gained momentum in the 1990s, influenced by the Mandal Commission report and Ambedkar centenary celebrations. Writers like Bama, Joseph Macwan, and Gogu Shyamala have made significant contributions to Tamil Dalit literature. In Telugu literature, Dalit voices gained prominence through the activism of leaders like Kathi Padma Rao and Bojja Tarakam, addressing issues of caste discrimination and social injustice. Gujarati Dalit literature emerged in the 1970s with magazines like Puma and Panther, inspired by the Dalit Panthers movement in Maharashtra. Writers such as Rameshchandra Parmar and Sahil Parmar played vital roles in its development. Odia Dalit literature has a rich history dating back to the fifteenth century, with significant contributions from Sudramuni Sarala Dasa and Bhima Bhoi. Writers like Basudeb Sunani and Pitambar Tarai have furthered the Dalit literary movement in Odisha. Additionally, Dalit literature encompasses various forms such as poetry, autobiographies, and oral history narratives, with notable works including "Karukku" by Bama and "The Weave of My Life" by Urmila Pawar. The Indian author Rajesh Talwar has written a play titled 'Gandhi, Ambedkar, and the Four-Legged Scorpion' in which the personal experiences of Ambedkar and the sufferings of the community have been highlighted.

In Sri Lanka, writers such as K. Daniel and Dominic Jeeva gained mainstream popularity.

== In the film industry ==
Until the 1980s, Dalits had little involvement in Bollywood or other film industries of India and the community were rarely depicted at the heart of storylines. Chirag Paswan (son of Dalit leader Ram Vilas Paswan) launched his career in Bollywood with his debut film Miley Naa Miley Hum in 2011. Despite political connections and the financial ability to struggle against ingrained prejudices, Chirag was not able to "bag" any other movie project in the following years. Chirag, in his early days, described Bollywood as his "childhood dream", but eventually entered politics instead. When the media tried to talk to him about "Caste in Bollywood", he refused to talk about the matter. A recent Hindi film to portray a Dalit character in the leading role, although it was not acted by a Dalit, was Eklavya: The Royal Guard (2007). The continued use of caste based references to Dalit sub-castes in South Indian films (typecast and pigeonholed in their main socio-economic sub-group) angers many Dalit fans.

A Brazilian telenovela India: A Love Story was broadcast in 2009 where the main female character Maya, who is of upper class, falls in love with a Dalit person.

== Internal conflicts ==
Several Dalit groups are rivals and sometimes communal tensions are evident. A study found more than 900 Dalit sub-castes throughout India, with internal divisions. Emphasising any one caste threatens what is claimed to be an emerging Dalit identity and fostering rivalry among SCs.

A DLM (Dalit Liberation Movement) party leader said in the early 2000s that it is easier to organise Dalits on a caste basis than to fight caste prejudice itself.

Balmikis and Pasis in the 1990s boycotted the BSP, claiming it was a Jatav party.

Many converted Dalit Sikhs claim a superior status over the Hindu Raigars, Joatia Chamars and Ravidasis and sometimes refuse to intermarry with them. They are divided into gotras that regulate their marriage alliances. In Andhra Pradesh, Mala and Madiga were constantly in conflict with each other but as of 2015 Mala and Madiga students work for common dalit cause at university level.

Although the Khateek (butchers) are generally viewed as a higher caste than Bhangis, the latter refuses to offer cleaning services to Khateeks, believing that their profession renders them unclean. They also consider the Balai, Dholi and Mogya as unclean and do not associate with them.

== See also ==
- Dalit League
- Dalit studies
- Caste discrimination in the United States
- 2006 Dalit protests in Maharashtra
- Bhim Army
- Chaitya Bhoomi
- Dalit Buddhism
- Dalit History Month
- Dalit nationalism
- Ambedkar Makkal Iyakkam
- Ayyathan Gopalan
- Bhopal Conference
- Deekshabhoomi
- Health care access among Dalits in India
- Lord Buddha TV
- Dalit Kitchens of Marathwada, book on Marathwada dalit cuisine
- Mahadalit
- Marichjhapi massacre
- Nepaldalitinfo
- Namantar Andolan

=== Similarly discriminated groups ===
- Baekjeong, untouchable caste in Korea.
- Bụi đời, outcast community of Vietnam after the Fall of Saigon.
- Burakumin, in Japan.
- Cagot, in France and Spain.
- Caquins of Brittany, in France
- Cascarots, an ethnic group in the Spanish Basque country and the French Basque coast sometimes linked to the Cagots.
- Cleanliness of blood, ethnic discrimination in the Spanish Old Regime.
- Maragato, in Spain.
- Melungeons, of America's central Appalachia.
- In China, Tanka in Guangdong (Cantonese: 疍家, "boat people"), Fuzhou Tanka in Fujian (Fuzhounese: 曲蹄, [kʰuo˥ lɛ˥˧]), si-min (small people) and mianhu in Jiangsu, Gaibu (丐戶) and Duomin (Wu Chinese: 惰民, [tu min], "idle/lazy/fallen/indolent people") in, jiuxing yumin (Chinese: 九姓魚民; lit. 'nine name fishermen') in the Yangtze River region, Yueji in Shaanxi (Jin Chinese: 乐籍, [jəʔ˧ tsjəʔ˧], the social class who entertains [the imperial court]")
- Vaqueiros de alzada, in Northern Spain.

== Sources ==
- Ballard, Roger (1994). Desh Pardesh: The South Asian Presence in Britain. Hurst. p. 110. ISBN 978-1-85065-091-1.
- Gorringe, Hugo (2005). Untouchable Citizens: Dalit Movements and Democratization in Tamil Nadu. Sage Publications. ISBN 978-0-7619-3323-6.
- Jain, L. C. (2005). Decentralisation and Local Governance: Essays for George Mathew. Orient Blackswan. ISBN 978-81-250-2707-2.
- Sangave, Vilas Adinath (1980). Jaina Community: A Social Survey. Popular Prakashan. ISBN 978-0-317-12346-3.
- Takhar, Opinderjit Kaur (2005). Sikh Identity: An Exploration of Groups Among Sikhs. Ashgate Publishing. ISBN 978-0-7546-5202-1.
