= Dalits in Bihar =

Post independence mobilisation of Dalits in Bihar

Dalits in Bihar are a social group composed of many Scheduled Castes, placed at the bottom of the "caste-based social order" in India. The Dalits also include some of the erstwhile untouchable castes, who suffered various forms of oppression in the feudal-agrarian society of Bihar. Some of the Dalit castes have specific cultural practices, which differ from those of orthodox Hinduism.

In the post-independence period, the failure of land reform led to a lack of socio-economic mobility among them, in contrast to the agricultural castes. This led to an increase in caste-based strife between the Dalit supported Naxalite groups and the state authorities backed by the dominant social groups. In the meantime, many caste-based private armies were formed by the landlord class to quell the Dalit assertion under the banner of Maoism. Ranvir Sena was the most dreaded caste-based militia of the landlords, and perpetrated a number of massacres against the Dalits. Some of the backward castes also emerged as landlords, due to the partial success of the Green Revolution and land reform, and Dalits came into conflict with them as well. In the later years, a socio-political assertion was witnessed in the Dalits of Bihar. After the 1990s, many welfare drives were undertaken by the Government of Bihar to improve the condition of Dalits.

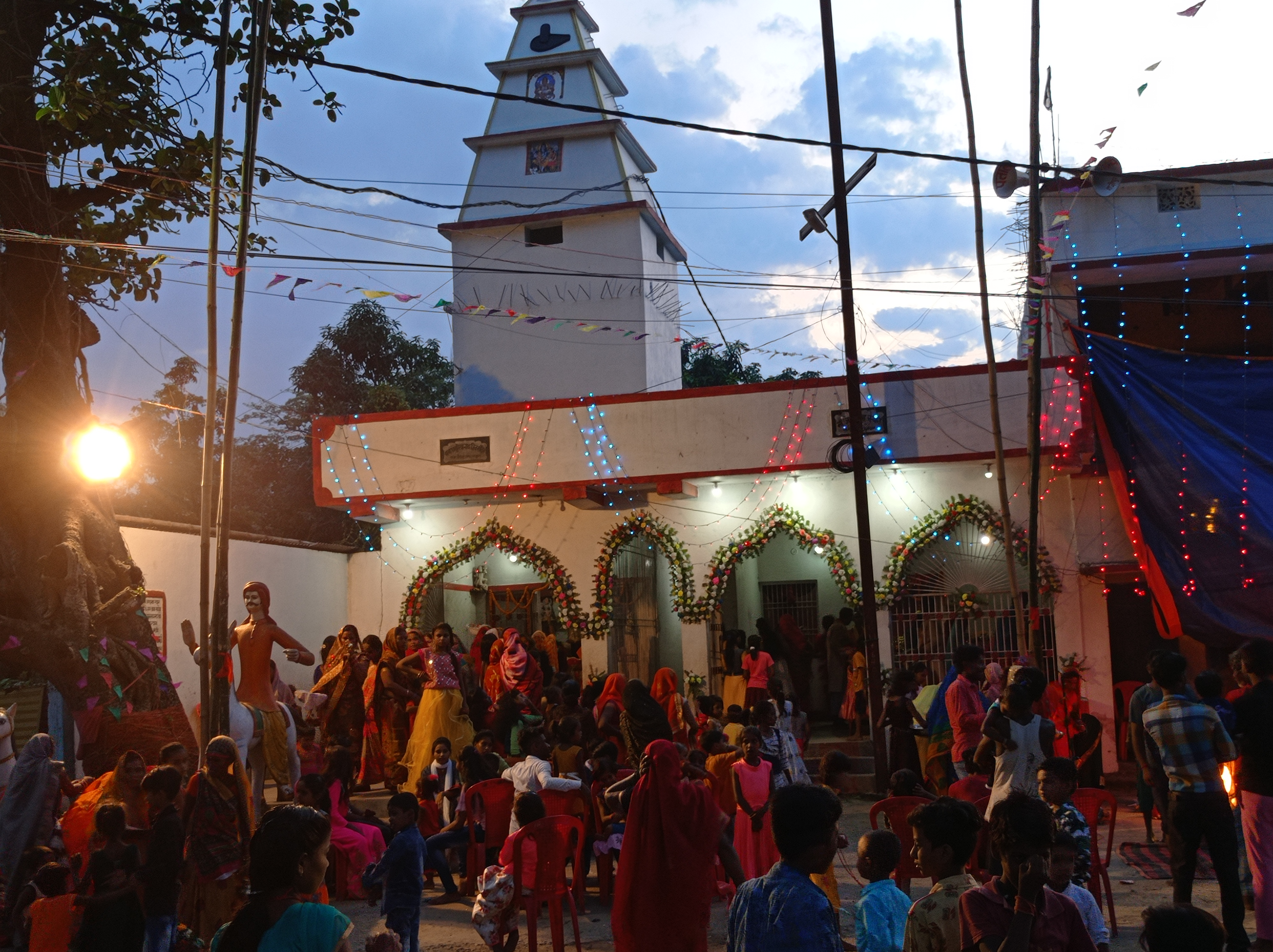
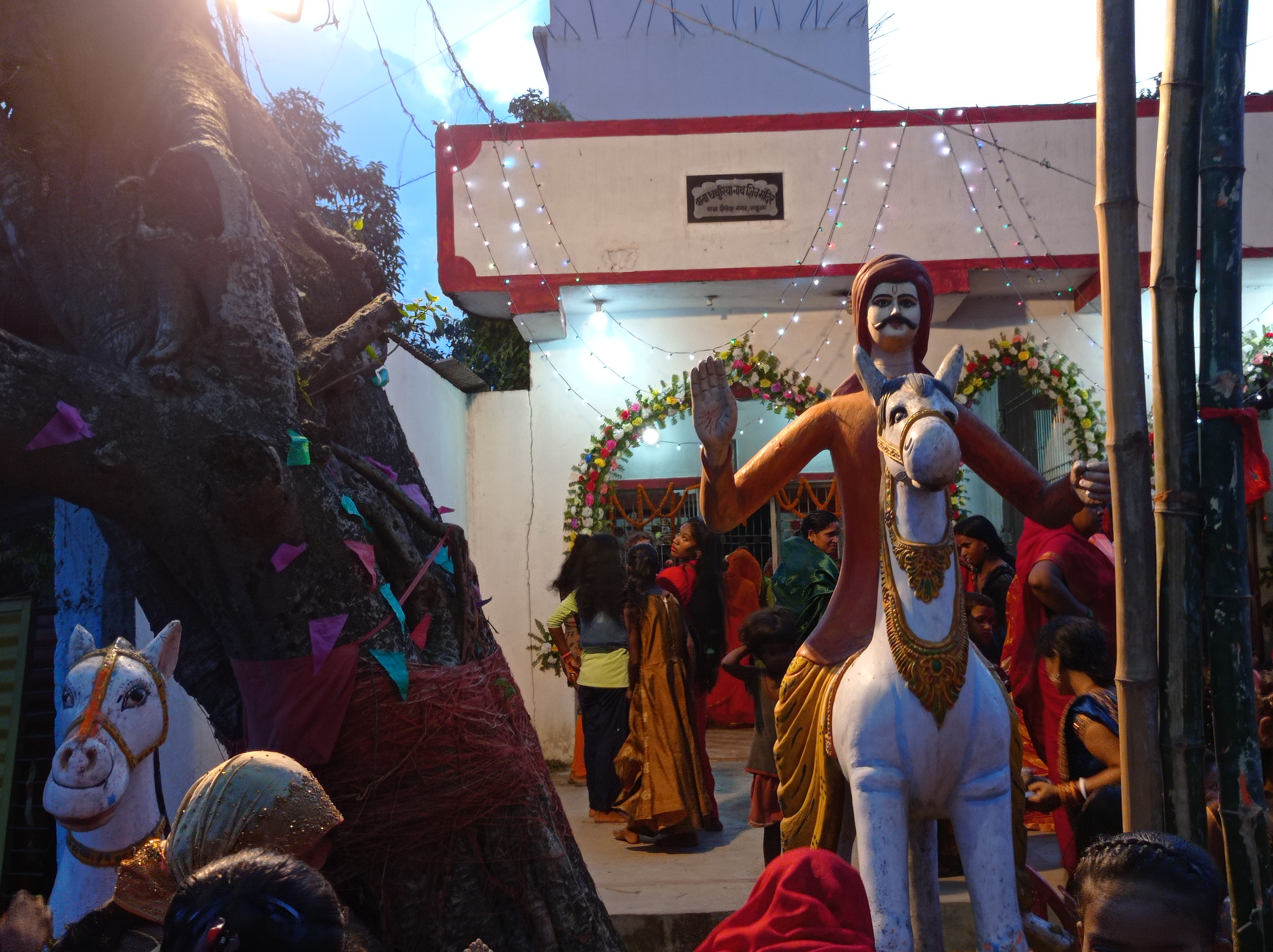
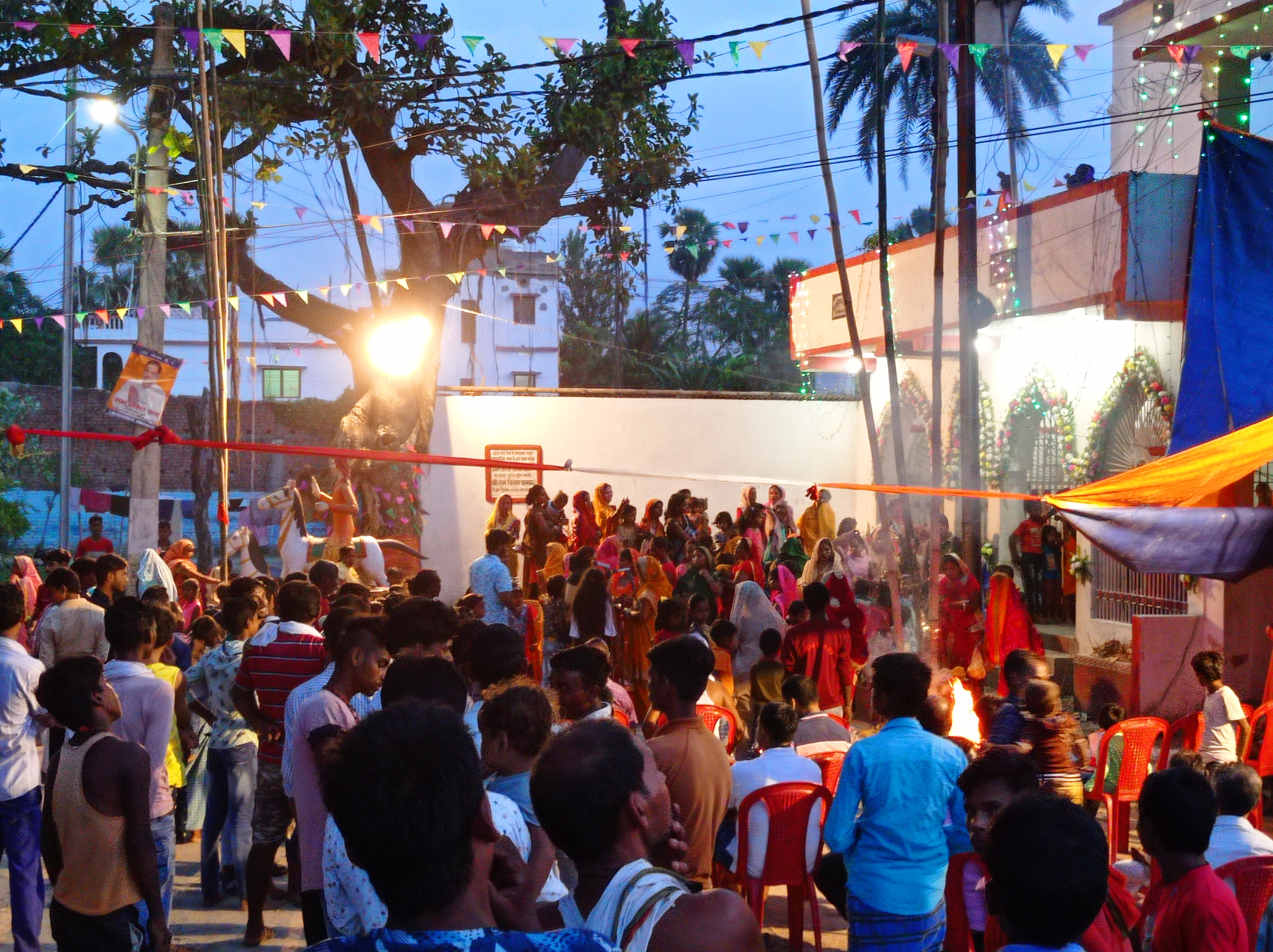
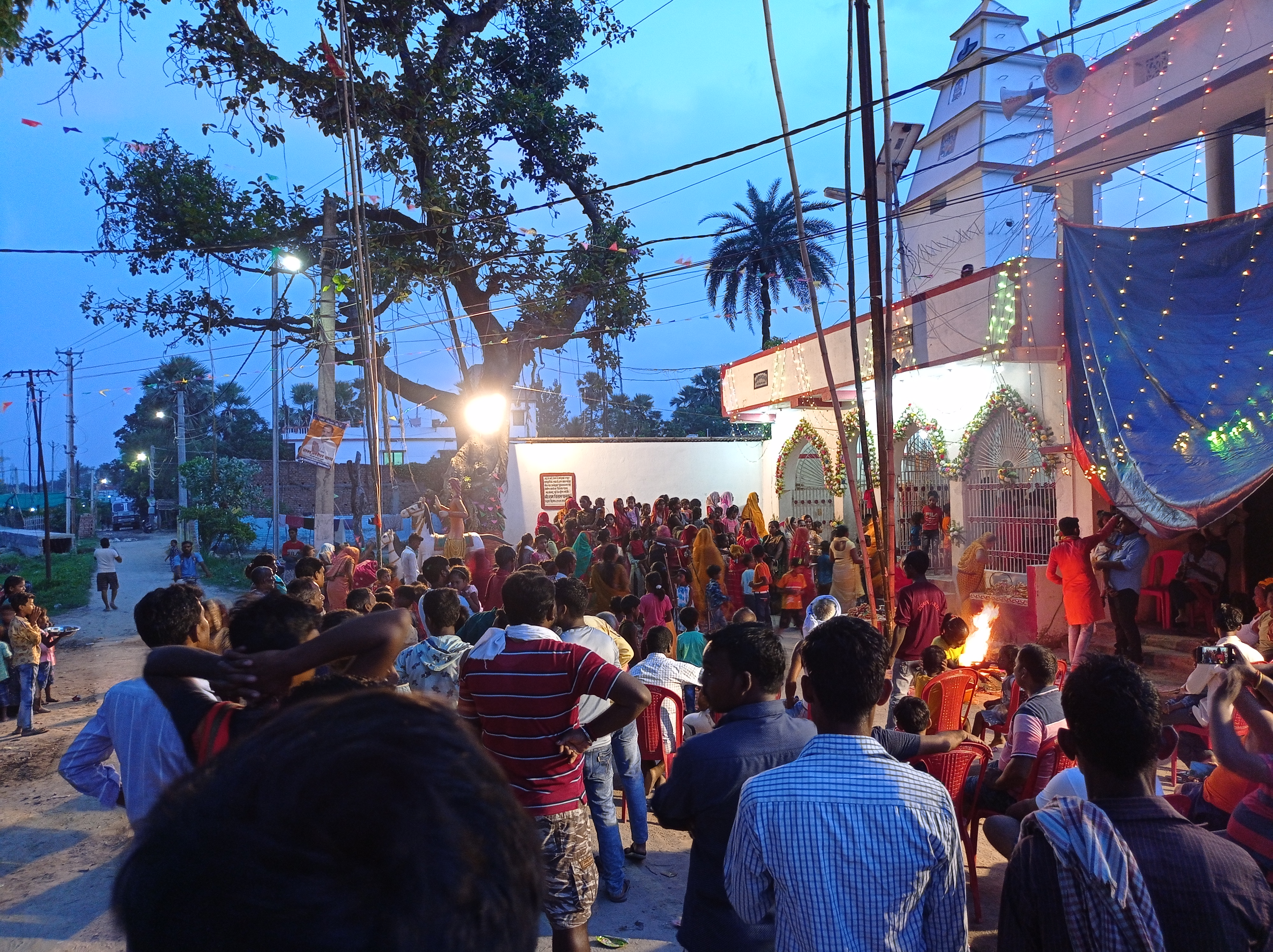
Annual fair organised at the sacred precinct of Chauharmal, near Patna-Hajipur main route. Scenes from the fair representing the participation of people. The Chauharmal fair is a significant festival of Dalit castes like Dusadh; it includes performance of rituals and worship of the folk deity.

== Dalit communities of Bihar ==
According to the 2011 Census, the Dalits constitute 16% of the population of Bihar, and 21 out of 23 Dalit castes are categorised as Mahadalits— a new category created by the government of Bihar to identify the most underprivileged Dalits. The Dalit castes identified as Mahadalits are:

- Bantar,
- Bauri,
- Bhogta,
- Bhuiya,
- Chaupal,
- Dabgar,
- Dom (Dom (caste)),
- Ghasi,
- Halalkhor,
- Hari (Mehtar, Bhangi),
- Kanjar,
- Kurariar,
- Lal Begi,
- Musahar,
- Nat,
- Pan (Swasi),
- Rajwar,
- Turi,
- Dhobi,
- Pasi,
- Chamar and
- Paswan (Dusadh).

The Paswan caste was initially left out of the Mahadalit category, but later included. The population of Scheduled Castes in Bihar has remained almost constant, with only a 2% increase, between the census of 2001 and the census of 2011. The census data of 2011 shows the sex ratio among the Scheduled Castes increasing, as compared to the 2001 census. It was 923 in 2001 and in 2011 it increased to 925 females per 1,000. In recent times, Bihar has witnessed a jump in the literacy rate among the Scheduled Castes of 20.2 percentage points, from 28.5 percent in 2001 to 48.6 percent in 2011.

The growth of the literacy rate is primarily attributed to the increased enrollment rates among Scheduled Caste women. The enrollment ratio increased between 2009 and 2014, for both the primary and upper primary level of schooling. In 2009–2010 it was 10 lakh in the primary level and 2.09 lakh at the upper primary level. It increased to 14.39 lakh in the primary and 5.47 lakh in the upper primary level in the year 2013–2014. Since at the primary level enrollment rate is much higher as compared to the upper primary level, it is opined by Renu Chaudhary, professor at A.N Sinha Institute of Social Sciences (Patna), that the SC girls are not encouraged to pursue their studies further, after completing the primary level of schooling.

=== Paswans ===
Paswans, also called "Dusadh", are an upwardly mobile Dalit caste, primarily inhabiting Bihar. Paswans follow various rituals to show their valour, which include walking on fire. They have created a unique space among the Scheduled Castes of Bihar with their mythical folklore, which revolves around folk heroes like Chauharmal and Sahlesh. In Bihar, they are the second-largest community among the Scheduled Castes, and in the census of 1981, their population was lower only than that of the Chamars. Some Dusadhs believe that they descended from the Kaurava prince Dushasana, and since the latter was a Chandravanshi Kshatriya, they claim to be this also. However, some Dusadhs claim to be the descendants of Gahlot Rajputs; according to this school of thought, the original Gahlots branched into 24 sub-castes, and the 21st came to be known as Dusadh. Since then, they have been primarily landless. Economic backwardness exists among them and they had instances of indebtedness to the Mahajans (moneylenders) in the past.

The Dusadhs, according to political scientist Sanjay Kumar, have been voting for Ram Vilas Paswan ever since his rise as a leader of the community, or for the alliance to which he belongs, both in the Lok Sabha and State Assembly election in 2009–10. Ram Vilas Paswan is also popular among other Dalit castes, but a division from other Dalits is seen, when the opportunity to vote for him comes. Over time, other political parties have also initiated programs to win the support of the Dalit constituency of the state. It is opined by Kumar that most of the benefits of government policies for Dalits in Bihar have been cornered by Dusadhs only, at the cost of other Dalit communities. This is true for the policy of reservation too.

Due to the nature of their occupation and social standing, Dusadhs of Bihar were first among the Dalit castes to form caste-based organisations for social upliftment. They also participated in the reform movement and struggles against the established order for their castemen. One of the first caste-based organisation of Dusadhs, called Bhartiya Dusadh Sabha, was formed as early as 1915, by the elites among them. According to Shaibal Gupta, the Arya Samaj movement also influenced them, and in their case, instead of making them progressive, it strengthened their belief in the conservative ideals of Brahminism like karma and dharma.

=== Pasi caste ===
Pasi were generally a Toddy tapper caste. They are considered physically strong, but culturally and educationally behind many other Dalit castes with more educational mobility. Earlier, due to their physical fitness, they were employed by Zamindars as lathi-wielding guards. They possess very small landholdings and perform some craft work too, on their doorsteps, to earn a living. Compared to Bihar, their population in Uttar Pradesh is quite high. By 1994, some educational mobility had been seen among them, and they started giving importance to the education of their children. The palm tree not only provides them the drink called toddy, but the raw materials for their craft are also extracted from it.

=== Musahar ===
Musahar are a caste of rat catchers and have been one of the most underprivileged communities of Bihar. Like many other untouchables, they were involved in menial work and this provided [them] very little scope for upward mobility. Due to their socio-economic backwardness, the state government has categorised them as Mahadalits, and both the central and state government have pursued a policy of social justice for them, through various schemes. Apart from Bihar, they are also found in West Bengal, Uttar Pradesh and Jharkhand. According to the census of 2011, the Musahar form the third-largest scheduled caste in the state after Dusadhs and Chamars. Their population, according to the 2011 census was 2,725,114 in the state of Bihar. Musahar were earlier classified as a tribe rather than a caste; they are said to have moved from the hills of Chhotanagpur to the plains of Bihar, as late as the 12th century. After their inclusion in Brahminical society, they were put at the lowest end of the caste-based social hierarchy, and were branded as untouchables. Further, after settling into the north Indian plains, the Musahars have been classified into Magahiya Musahars and Tirhutiya Musahars. The socio-economic conditions of Magahiya Musahars are slightly better than those of the Tirhutiya, and no instances of inter-marriage are observed between them.

Many colonial records also identify Musahars as a Dravidian tribe; they are known by various names such as Bhuyan, Bhumia, Cheru and Bhuihar. According to Gyan Prakash, in the British period, many upper-caste became Zamindars and they introduced many systems in the rural agrarian setup to exploit agricultural labourers. Systems like Kamiauti and Badaliya were set up in north and south Bihar and Musahar became a significant part of this class of agricultural labourers. Hence, in several parts of Bihar, they are also called Badaliya and Kamiya. Others argue that imposition of an image of rat eaters, pork eaters and 'people involved in alcoholism' on Musahars has been done by higher and dominant castes.

The Musahar also believe themselves to be Hindus of Kshatriya Varna; their folklores and folksongs represent the struggle and resistance against the dominant sections of society and the prevailing social order. During wedding ceremonies, Musahar women sing Jhoomar (a folk song); these songs are also sung during cultivating seasons. Some of these songs narrate the sexual exploitation faced by Musahar women. They also sing songs in praise of Dina and Bhadri, their folk deities, whom they believe to be their protectors during hardship. According to Sahay, one of their folk songs, which gives insights into their socio-economic condition is:

Bachpan mein baba kailan gawanawa, Sainya kahe rope chala dhanawa, Rope hum gaili jamindar ke badhariya, Jamindar papi nirkhai badaniya (While young, father got me married. My husband says, let's go to plant paddy. To plant paddy, I go to the zamindar's field; zamindar, the sinner, ogles at me), Majoori laawe gaili hum jamindar ke aganwa, Eke hathe jamindar papi taula hai majooriya, Doosar haathe toai aapan manwa and Saiyan kahe rope chala dhanawa (To fetch my wages, I go to the zamindar's courtyard. Zamindar, the sinner, weighs the wages with one hand and sexually fondles himself with the other hand; my husband says let us go to plant paddy.)

=== Dhobi caste ===
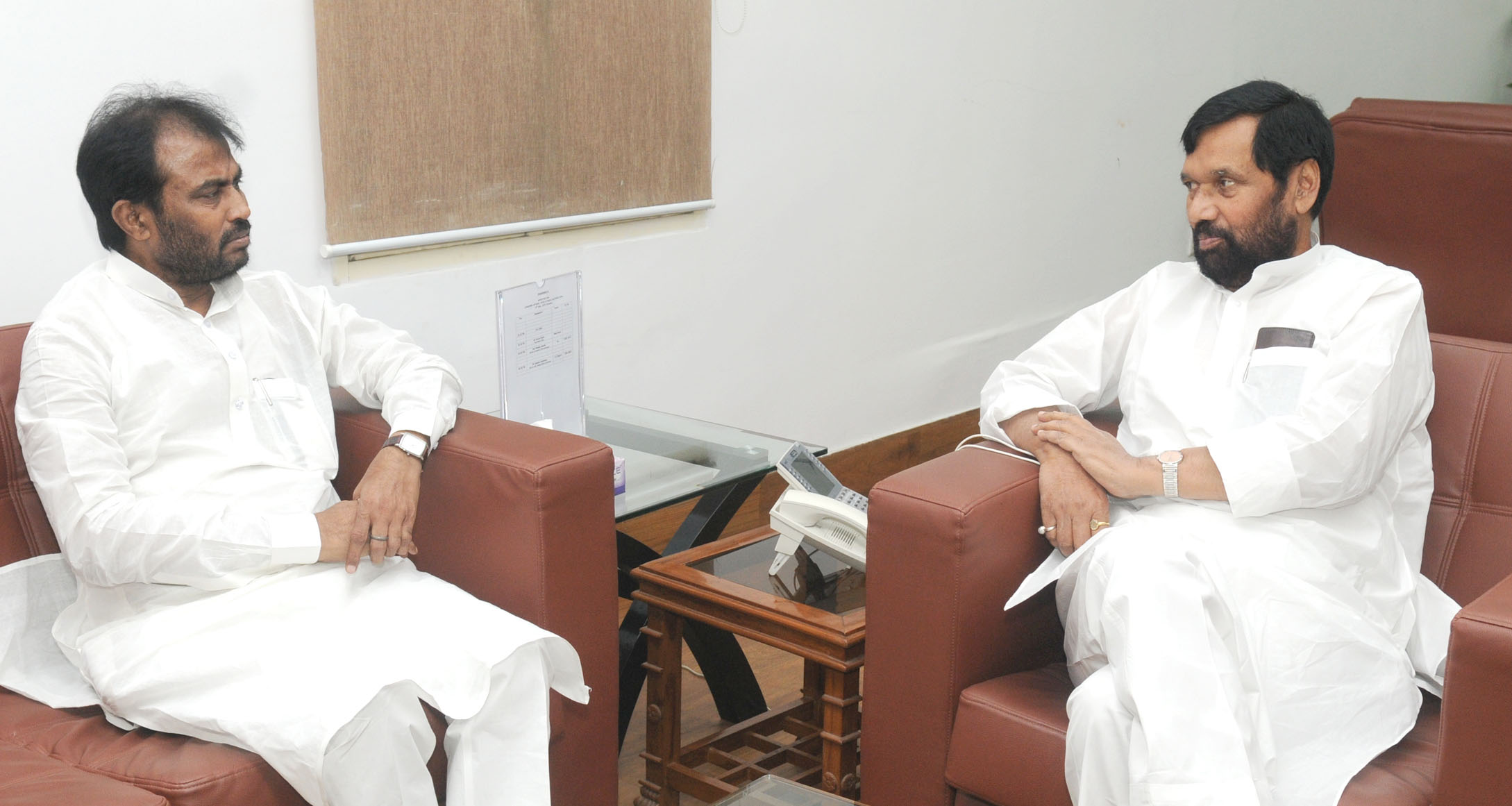
Shyam Rajak, president of Akhil Bharatiya Dhobi Mahasangh (a caste organization of the Dhobi community) (left) with former union minister Ram Vilas Paswan.

Dhobi caste has been associated with the profession of washerman in past. They are also called Rajak or Baintha and are often known in rural folk culture for quarrelsome women and donkeys. In their society, women perform the task of washing clothes at washing spots called ghats. Unlike other Dalit communities, who are primarily landless, Dhobis do possess some land. This is attributed to their role in society, since every village needed a Dhobi in the past. Some land was allotted to them for their service to the village community. Due to the availability of this land, some of the Dhobis also practice agriculture. They were paid in kind for their work and treated fairly, in comparison to other Dalit communities. The association of Dhobis to upper-caste families led to their cultural development, and of late, literacy has also become one of the observable phenomena in this caste. Nearly 30% of their men and 23% of women were literate by 1994.

== Culture, belief and folklore ==
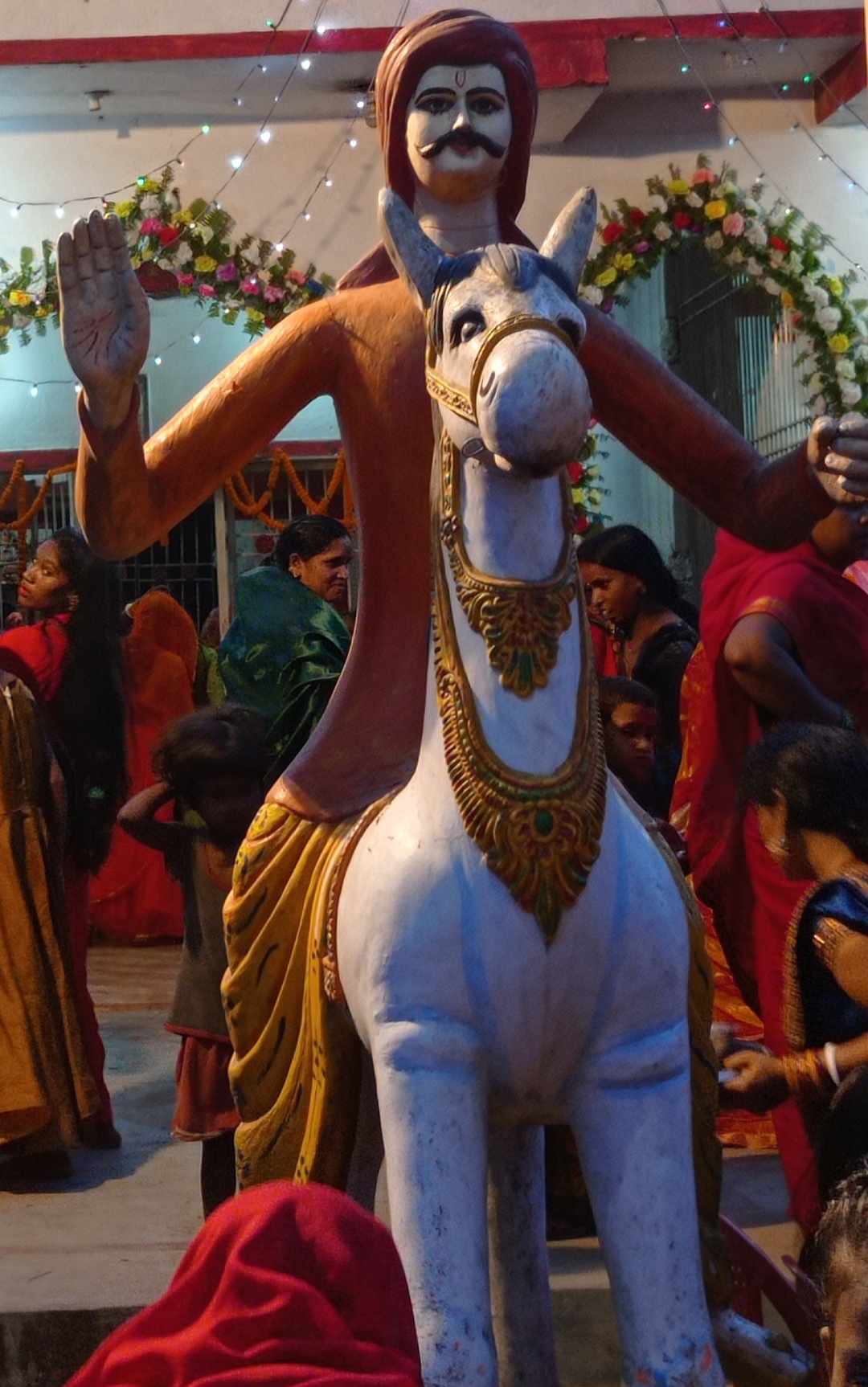
A statue of Chauharmal; the folk deity of Dusadh caste, located near Mahatma Gandhi Setu, close to Patna.

Many Dalit communities of Bihar associate themselves with the martial tradition, and their tales of the origin of their community also portray them as protectors of Hinduism. Many such castes found in Bihar and Uttar Pradesh share beliefs regarding their origin and martial tradition. The Pasis consider themselves to have originated from the sweat of Parashuram. They believe that they originated when Parashuram was fighting with the destroyers of cows, and in the course of time, as he sweated, the Pasis were born. Similarly, communities like Dusadh (Paswan), in some areas, consider their folk hero Chauharmal also a protector of cows.

These folk tales reflect antagonism against Muslims and are also common among the Musahars. The folk hero of the Musahar caste, Dina Bhadri, is also associated with saving cows. Many Dusadh and Musahar also believe that their ancestors migrated to Bihar, protecting the mathas and temples, along with Rajput soldiers, amidst the Muslim invasion in the medieval period. Some Dalit castes with martial tradition like the Pasi and Dusadh say that they were settled outside the perimeter of villages, because they were assigned the duty to protect the cattle owned by the villagers from the Muslims.

Pasi even claim they were the saviours of upper-caste Hindus, and they adopted the practice of rearing pigs, as pigs are anathema to Muslims, who avoid them. Educated and enlightened Pasi stress that the same caste Hindus, who assigned the rearing of pigs as a caste occupation for them, now consider this practice to be associated with untouchability. The Pasi also believe that before the arrival of Muslims, they ruled several parts of present-day Uttar Pradesh. They ascribe to a conspiracy of upper-caste Hindus and the Mughal reign their dethronement. Their king, Baldev, committed suicide rather than submit to his adversaries, according to their beliefs.

Another popular narrative among the Dalits is about a saint called Gauriya Baba. He lived in the Mughal period, and is known for opposing the unjust rule of the Mughals, who oppressed non-Muslims. According to Dalit folklore, Gauriya Baba primarily belonged to Dusadh community, like Sahlesh and Chauharmal. But he used to protect Dhanuk, Rajpoot, Mallah, Mali and other castes as well. The Mughals used to kidnap Hindu girls and marry them forcibly. Baba, who was said to be a skilled horseman, fought a one-man battle against them, to prevent them from converting the Hindus and to protect the property of rich Hindus from looting. Baba also used to slaughter a pig and bury its head in his yard, to prevent Muslim soldiers from entering his house and arresting him. His house was located in the front side of the village and preventing entry into his house was like preventing the Muslims from entering the village. According to folklore, he used to guard the villagers under his protection, regularly patrolling on his horse.

Unlike Dusadhs and Pasis, who have generated their own folklore regarding their origin, the origin of Musahars is mentioned in Brahminical mythology and the earliest history of Musahars are also known to the scholars from these mythologies as well as British records. According to them, when lord Shiva created mankind, he generated the first man of each caste group, and gave them some tools and a horse to ride. When the first man of Musahar caste got these tools, unlike others, who rode their horses, he began to dig two holes on the two sides of the belly of the horse, in order to fix his feet there. Lord Shiva became angry, and he cursed the whole caste to dig the holes in ground and catch the rats for their survival. Shiva also observed the habit of Musahar men of licking plates after eating, and he further cursed this caste by saying that they would lick the plates of others for leading their lives. Hence, the Brahminical mythology degraded them and considered them as "most impure caste". There are various proverbs, which are popular in Hindu mythology, which show a negative attitude towards the Musahars among the Hindu castes.

The deification of death is also observed among some of the Dalit castes of Bihar; it, being a common theme in the culture of India as the spirit worship, is popular among the Musahars of the Gaya district of Bihar. According to one opinion, the worship of Preta (spirit) is a manifestation of the memories of injustice in the minds of community, who prefer to display it, through the cult of violent and malevolent spirit. Among the Musahars of this region, there is a belief regarding a violent spirit called Murkatwa, a headless creature, or a beheaded person, who keeps on avenging his death.

A major section of Kamia (usually consisting of low caste population) in south Bihar also sees the Bhuiyan Puja as a form of cultic dispossession. This particular performance, which involves the worship of earth, is popular in various parts of country with various names, and in Bihar too, and though it forms part of the culture of Dalits, it is not limited to them. Gyan Prakash argues that instead of creating the mythical past, the performance of Bhuyan Puja moves the present to some kind of mythical or ideal past. This cult is also popular among cattle herders and small agricultural communities apart from the Kamias and according to popular belief, Bhuiyan was a female deity, who sacrificed her life for protection of land, and she has an ability to interfere in the problems of one's everyday life.

In south Bihar region, the story of Reshama and Chauharmal is popular among the Dalits. The story represents a symbolic victory of the Dalits over the upper castes. In this region, many caste riots have also happened over the theatrical performances based on this story. Since, in caste-based society, Dalit boys flirting with upper-caste girls is considered objectionable, the Bhumihars take this story as an insult to their prestige. In a particular village of south Bihar, it was reported that, after one such riot, two rival groups of caste emerged; while one consisted of the castes like Dusadh, Chamar, Koeri and other OBCs, the second group contained Bhumihars, who were against this performance. According to the narrative of the Dusadh caste, Chauharmal and Ajabi Singh were friends, and former was the son of a wrestler from the Anjani village located in present-day Mokama region. Ajabi Singh was the son of local king and the theatrical narrative of Dusadhs says that both of them went to same school and were classmates too. Ajabi Singh looked after the affairs of his court, while Chauharmal is said to be owner of an Akhada (Gym), where he trains the local wrestlers, apart from looking after his cattles.

In the story or in representation of Chauharmal, he is portrayed as an upper-caste, who puts a vermillion mark (Tika) on his forehead and carries a sword. Further, Chauharmal was also described as a devotee of the goddess Durga, and unlike Ajabi Singh, who is also a devotee of same goddess, he is blessed with special powers by the goddess. One day Chauharmal was invited by Ajabi Singh to his home for food, and Reshma, the sister of Ajabi Singh served food to him. Meanwhile, when Chauharmal is talking to her brother, she behaved in a lustful manner. She tries to convince Chauharmal for her love, but latter, being a 'man of moral standards' neglects her. It is opined by the scholars, that through the cult of Chauharmal, Dusadhs portray the lack of morality among the Bhumihar women.

The cult of Chauharmal and other folk heroes like Dina Bhadri (of the Musahar caste) also became tool of mobilisation of Dalits in this region, after the Naxalism emerged against the feudal dominance of the upper-castes. In their battles against the landlords, the Naxalite guriellas, who primarily belonged to the lower caste, didn't chanted slogans in the name of Marx or Mao, but the names of caste heroes like Dina Bhadri and Chauharmal baba was invoked. Leaders like Lalu Prasad Yadav, who emerged as the leader of Backwards in the 1990s, also used Chauharmal to mobilise the Dalits.

There are several genres of the Chauharmal-Reshama story, prevalent in different part of Bihar. According to another version of this story, Chauharmal falls in love with a Brahmin girl and dies prematurely. Due to his premature death, he gets converted into a benevolent spirit, who takes care of the community inside the home. In the agricultural fields, outside the home, he becomes a malevolent spirit, who, if not propitiated, takes revenge by uprooting the crops of the big farmers. This particular story comes from Ram Prakash Chaubey's collection of the folklores of the Bihar. The Dusadh also worship spirit of Chauharmal, whom they consider their ancestral deity, in the land worship ceremony (Bhuiyan Puja). On this particular occasion, a Bhagat (officiating priest of the ceremony) sings the song to glorify Baba Chauharmal.

Brahma Prakash believes that these stories represents a social message; they work in two way, in one, it signifies community solidarity of the Dusadhs among themselves and in other way, it represents their aspiration of the dominant caste, propitiating the spirit of their ancestral deity because of its terrorising image. George Abraham Grierson has documented Chauharmal as a thief in his initial life, which represents the colonial bias against the marginalized heroes of the lower caste communities. As per this version of story, Chauharmal used to work as an attendant of the king, who didn't pay him wages on time, and in order to avenge the insult meted out to him, latter decides to become a thief. He punishes the king by stealing the jewellery of the king's daughter. While this version keeps Dusadhs and Chauharmal in negative light, the Dusadh caste was further criminalised in the colonial period by being included in the Criminal Tribes Act.

=== Naach or Launda Naach ===
The Naach which is also called Launda Naach, is a dance form originating in the state of Bihar, but also practiced in the neighbouring states like Uttar Pradesh. It was a popular folk dance of the depressed castes and its popular themes also included the "caste struggle" inherent in the society of Bihar. With the passage of time, the dominant castes also associated with it and Bhikhari Thakur reorganized it with little variation to rename it as Bideshiya (migrant). The term Launda literally mean a young land, but in everyday language, it represents a person who is effeminate, vulgar, immature and from an inferior class or caste. According to author Jainendra Kumar Dost renaming of Naach as Launda Naach was a strategy employed by the upper-castes and classes of Bhojpuri society as a way of belittling a popular folk tradition that belongs to the Other.

In Bihar, during the Mughal period and afterwards, the Baiji Naach (dance of Tawayafs) catered to the upper section of society, primarily the feudal lords and the moneylenders. In the lower strata i.e. among lower and middle castes, the dance of male acting as a female was popular, and it was known as Naach, later Launda Naach. Here, the term Launda describes the male, who is acting as a female. The Naach performance always attacked the upper caste and classes for the atrocities they committed on the lower castes and hence, it was stigmatised by the upper castes as the vulgar and uncouth art. As per Dost, most of the artists and proprietors of the Naach folk art comes from the lower castes and its songs, music, dance, plot and comic elements are largely associated with lower caste-class experiences and aesthetics.

One of the popular performance in this theatrical art form used to be Lakhdev Ram's famous play Ghurva Chamaar (1965). The story revolves around the Dalit person called Ghurva Chamaar, who wanted to go to temple in order to worship the deity, but the temple priest wouldn't allow him because of his caste. As caste restrictions were applied on Dalits in earlier times, the play portrays it through the story of Ghurva Chamaar. When the protagonist tries to enter the temple, the priest stops him. Chamaar requests him that he has brought a gold coin to donate to the deity and the greedy priest allows him to enter the temple.

Suddenly the Queen arrives, and she asks the priest that how the lower caste man entered the temple. Unable to answer her, the priest lies that he sneaked into temple. Chamaar was then beaten badly as punishment for his act of defiance. But, the news of the incident spreads and the Queen loses the elections, because of her act of punishing the lower caste man. The lower caste audience liked this theme after it was introduced in the Naach performances.

== Atrocities against Dalits ==
=== Root cause of atrocities against Dalits ===
The government of Bihar, led by KB Sahay was the chief architect of land reforms. The land reforms determined the upper ceiling for the land to be held by an individual household and the distribution of surplus land to the landless. But, the Zamindari abolition didn't immediately follow the land reforms, as the Indian National Congress in initial decades of the post-independence period, remained dominated by Rajput and the Bhumihar caste, who became suspicious of these reforms. Apart from this, these land reform laws had a number of conciliatory measures, which allowed the landlords to manipulate its provisions. Many problems like "absentee landlordism", illegal distribution of land, "bataidari" on unfavorable terms led to brewing of discontent among the landless population. The Bhoodan movement launched by Vinoba Bhave also had limited success, not enough to satisfy the needs of large section of landless people. These challenges provided fertile ground for Naxalism to emerge. The Naxalite groups began organising these landless labourers for their rights.

Oliver Mendelsohn and Marika Vicziany have explained that the untouchables who formed the bottom of the social set up in Bihar have clashed with many communities including Yadavs, Kurmis etc. in the middle segment and Bhumihars, Rajputs, Brahmins from the upper segment of the society. The scholars have identified land control being the major characteristic of the opponents and not the caste identity in itself. It has been suggested that neither the exploiters of the untouchables have the same caste identity in all the region nor were the conflicts only restricted to Bihar. This has been the situation of untouchables throughout the country where they have also come into conflict with peasant communities and not only the upper castes.

While Yadav can be the bitter enemies of landless Dalits on one instance, in the other instance, poor among the Yadavs can fight together with Dalits too. It is evident from various instances that sometimes caste feelings lead to unification of Yadavs from various socio-economic background, at the other times, it may not. Further, after the rise of Naxalism from the Bhojpur district in Bihar, many Backward Caste leaders had provided the leadership to the movement besides the untouchable leaders, in order to improve the situation of Dalits.

Sumit Srivastava noted that more than two-third of the land in Bihar was with upper castes which included Bhumihars, Rajputs and Brahmins. The lower castes were mostly tenants, agricultural labourers and in many instances even bonded labourers. To make the situation worse for the Dalits, the backward communities like Koeris, Yadavs and Kurmis who in some parts of Bihar had gained from the partial success of green revolution were equally violent with Dalit labourers. Overall the poor results of land reforms and failures of Bhoodan-Gramdan movement was responsible for the bad condition.

=== Forms of atrocities ===
In the feudal society of rural Bihar, the lower castes were dehumanised, as indicated by the available records of the initial decades after independence. Author Kalyan Mukherjee's account of the Bhojpur region (a stronghold of Naxalism in Bihar), points towards the dual challenge of wages and honour in front of the lower castes, who were subjected to the tyrannical attitude of the upper-caste landlords, primarily belonging to Rajput and Bhumihar castes. Mukherjee elaborates that the landlords were not only involved in the sexual exploitation of the lower caste women, but they also treated the lower castes in inhumane manner. According to Mukherjee, sitting in front of the landlord, on the cot, even in front of their own houses, and wearing a clean dhoti was also considered as a challenge to the authority of the upper-castes. The existence of the practices like Dola Pratha— the custom in which the newly wed Dalit bride was forced to spend her first night with the Rajput and Bhumihar landlord of her locality— also points towards the dehumanisation of the Dalits, under the socio-political dominance of the upper-castes.

== Dola pratha ==
=== Other form of oppression ===
Journalist Farzand Ahmed writing for India Today narrates the oppression of Dalits in pre-independence period. In the 1930s, according to Ahmed, the upper-caste landlords in the Gaya district of Bihar used to visit the houses of Dalits, demanding one seer of milk from each Dalit household. If they were unable to fulfill the demand of the landlords, the same amount of milk was to be supplied from the lactating womenfolks of the Dalits.

In another report from the Palamu district of Bihar, Journalist Uttam Sengupta narrates the feudal practice of upper-caste landlords, who often visit nearby "Harijan tola" (hamlets inhabited by the Dalits) and ask the men to send their wives and daughters to Kothi (bungalows of the landlords). They'll further remind the Dalit men to ask their women to have a bath before visiting the Kothi, in order to spend their night there. The reporting from Jahanabad district reveals that Thakur landlords in this region found it stimulating to rape the Dalit women in their own homes, in the presence of their menfolks. Some of these landlords would make the Dalit men lie below the cot, when they rape their wives and any noise and resistance from the former would provoke the landlord to shoot them. Human Rights Watch reports have identified Alcoholism and 'rape of Dalit women' by upper-caste groups like Bhumihars as the prime reason behind some of the massacres that took place in the 1990s, one such incident was Haibaspur carnage in the Patna district, where the rape of Musahar women repeatedly by the Bhumihars, when they came to drink liquor prepared by them, triggered the carnage of Musahar people.

Haibaspur carnage

The Dalits made alcohol, and Bhumihars drank it. When Bhumihars fought among themselves, they went to the Mushahars [Dalits], gave them drinks, and got them to take revenge on their enemies by taking their field crops and so on. But the Dalits were working for both sides so the Bhumihars killed them. They were double-crossing them. They only gave them liquor to get them to do the work. Bhumihars give them money to make the liquor, then give some liquor to the Dalits to get them to do the work. Whoever makes alcohol also pays a commission to the police. When the Bhumihars came and drank, they also raped the Mushahar women. Mushahar men did not like it so they protested and were killed. The people killed were mostly innocent, but these are the two reasons it happened."""

— Human Rights Watch.

In the Agiaon Assembly constituency of the Bhojpur district, the local residents from the downtrodden Musahar caste alleged the Bhumihar landlords of being exploitative in the past. According to them, they were not allowed to wear slippers in front of the landlords and their daughters were forced to visit the house of the landlords, night before their marriage. The question of 'enhancement of wages' also brought violent reaction leading to killings of the Musahars. It is opined that the state apparatus also supported the Rajputs and the Bhumihars in these clashes.

Authors Kalyan Mukherjee and Rajendra Singh Yadav opined that the numerical supremacy was not the cause of exploitation of the people from the lower castes like Chamar and Musahars by the landed class. It was control over economic resources and the labour force which ensured the supremacy of the Rajputs and the Bhumihars. In order to keep these people in a submissive state and to maintain their overlordship over them, the 'culture of violence' was adopted by the lathails (strongmen and proteges) of the landlords. Often in the evening or in the lonely stretches of the fields, the womenfolks of lower-caste Dalits were raped by the men of the landlords. Besides Begar (unpaid work in the fields of master), wearing of clean clothes and sitting on a cot even in front of their own houses were not allowed to the lower castes.

=== Sexual misconducts as part and parcel of life ===
In the Shahabad district, Rajput and Bhumihar landowners frequently raped lower-caste women, and by the 1930s, the Triveni Sangh gave the abused women a platform to express their frustration. In a survey conducted in a few villages in Bhojpur, rape of lower caste women from Musahar and Chamar caste, by the Rajput and Bhumihar landlords was a major cause of anguish until Naxalism emerged on the scene. As per one opinion, in parts of central Bihar, "Even as late as the 1970s, the rape of lower caste women by Rajputs and Bhumihars had almost become a tradition, an accepted social evil, a fate which many bore unquestioningly".

Ranabir Samaddar cited example of one Anwa village where upper-caste Rajputs practiced Dola Pratha in which the newly wed bride of the Dalits and landless labourers (who worked for wages in their fields), had to spend one night with the landlord before commissioning of her nuptial rites. According to Govind Kelkar, the Co-ordinator of the Gender and Development Studies Unit at the Asian Institute of Technology in Pathumthani, Thailand:

One of the features of the caste system is a strict endogamy. But the subordination of the lower castes to the upper castes has also resulted in the general 'sexual availability' of lower caste women to large landowning, upper caste men. Rape and sexual assault on lower caste women, particularly Chamars and Musahars, were once considered the privilege of Rajput and Bhumihar landlords. The Dola custom (forcing every bride of the lower caste to spend the first night following her marriage with the local landlord) prevailed in the villages of Bhojpur and Rohtas districts.

A report from a particular village of Bihar called Sonatola tells that in neighbouring village Berath, some Dalit women alleged that when the lower caste women rejected the landlord's proposal of sexual contact, it was common for the landlords of the village to falsely implicate the male members of their families and their kin in criminal cases. There was also a practice to force the Dalit women from agricultural labourer families to have sexual contacts with their Rajput landlords. Besides sexual assaults, the drawing of water from the village wells and walking on the pathways alongside the landlords in that particular Rajput village were also forbidden for the lower castes as per their allegations. Some women also alleged that they had faced the undignified teasings like "pinching on the breast" by upper-caste landlords earlier.

The upper-caste men also exercised their social control and hegemony in the rural society through appropriation of the sexuality of the Dalit women. While the upper-caste women were secluded and confined to the home by their menfolks, the lower caste (particularly landless labourer women from the Dalit families) were not confined to home leaving them vulnerable to the gaze of upper caste men, who often forget the notion of 'purity and pollution' when getting into sexual contacts with the lower caste women. The Dalit men were often unable to save the dignity of their women primarily due to power relation and work situation in the rural areas. The pattern of sexual atrocities against the Dalit women were often more than just rapes and sexual misconducts. In one such example from a village of Samastipur district of north Bihar in 1994, a woman named Bhukli Devi was paraded naked on the charges of stealing some potatoes from the fields of Bhumihars. The public humiliation was followed by her rape and subsequently her Saree was inserted into her vagina. The insertion of Saree ( a piece of cloth) in the vagina of Dalit women could be understood as the upper-caste conception of the ritual impurity of the womb of a Dalit woman and their condemnation of the birth of future progeny of the Dalits.

Bhojpur region remained a hotbed of caste wars in Bihar. The region witnessed one of the biggest massacres of the Bihar. One such was 'Naarhi massacre' in which 7 Dalits were killed by the Upper Caste landlords. A reporting in the region by The Wire, involving the local Dalit people belonging to Musahar caste, revealed the presence of feudal practices like not allowing the Dalits to sit in the presence of the feudal lords, and prevalence of "bonded labour system" in the past. It was also alleged by the locals that most of the development fund allotted by the government for the region was utilised in the regions inhabited by local Rajputs.

By the 1960s, most of the prevalent feudal practices came to an end due to the activism of Kisan Sabhas, the organization led by middle peasant castes who also brought the issues of women rights and dignity within its fold and allowed the agricultural labourer women to voice for themselves.

=== Ranvir Sena ===
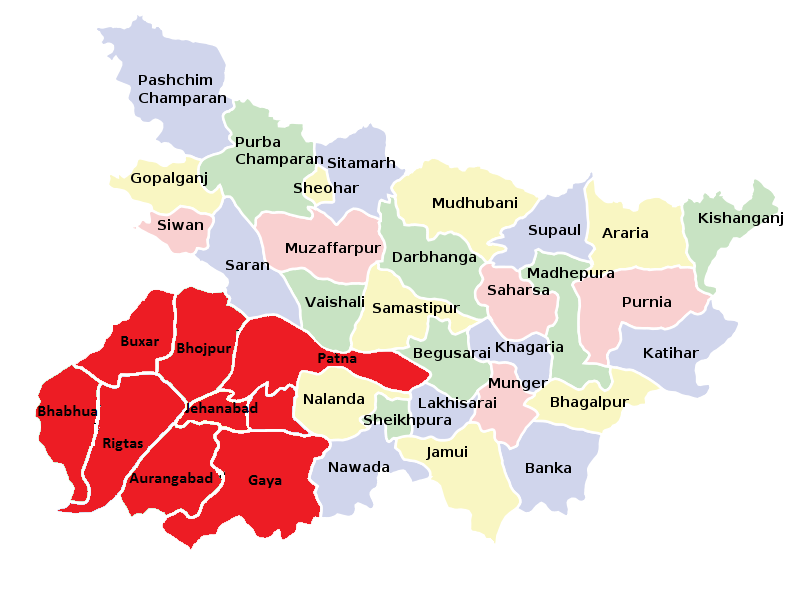
The map showing the districts of Bihar, affected by Ranvir Sena.

Out of all caste based armies of Bihar, which were launched to take on the Naxalites, who were encouraging the lower-caste Dalits to become vocal for their rights, Ranvir Sena was the most dreaded one. The Sena derived its identity and political support from Bhumihars, but other upper-caste groups like Rajputs also supported it. It was manned by the members of both Rajput and the Bhumihar caste. According to some sources, Rang Bahadur Singh Rajput happened to be the first president of Ranvir Sena, but later on the leadership passed into the hands of Brahmeshwar Singh. It committed many massacres on Dalits, out of which Laxmanpur Bathe massacre is most notable. An eyewitness account of one of the resident of the particular village, collected by a visiting team of Human Rights Watch explains the killing pattern of the Sena members and atrocities they committed against the Dalit women and girls. Surajmani Devi, a thirty two years old victim states:

Everyone was shot in the chest. I also saw that the panties were torn. One girl was Prabha. She was fifteen years old. She was supposed to go to her husband's house two to three days later. They also cut her breast and shot her in the chest. Another was Manmatiya, also fifteen. They raped her and cut off her breast. The girls were all naked, and their panties were ripped. They also shot them in the vagina. There were five girls in all. All five were raped. All were fifteen or younger. All their breasts were cut off.

The tactics followed by Ranvir Sena members to terrorise the lower caste villagers included rapes, looting of villages and massacres. The raising of voice against the rapes of Dalit women and girls also brought retaliation from the Sena members in some cases. As for example in 1997, three Dalit youths were gunned down for protesting against the rape of a Dalit girl by the upper-caste youths.

The hobnobbing between the state administration, particularly the police force and Ranvir Sena members, also remained a controversy for long. Many Naxalites were killed in police encounters while Ranvir Sena members were never subjected to confrontation with the police force. In districts of central Bihar, particularly the Bhojpur district, the police force has traditionally been dominated by the upper-caste Rajputs and Bhumihars, and in Bhojpur, "caste ties" has remained an important factor in the police force. Human rights activists hence argued that the collusion between Ranvir Sena and police officials have resulted in some small scale extrajudicial killings of Naxalites as well, apart from the large scale massacres perpetrated by the Sena members.

Ranvir Sena also enjoyed considerable political patronage with the chief Brahmeswar Singh himself being an activist of Bhartiya Janata Party. The Sena was also said to be dominated by the leaders of various political parties which included Indian National Congress and Janata Party. It was also alleged that Sena received arms and ammunition from some of the former members of Central Reserve Police Force. According to reports from People Union For Democratic Right and Human Rights Watch, the politicians from Ara district often used the Sena during election campaigns to gain votes in their favour, as the "booth capturing" (forcibly capturing the votes of people in the favour of a particular candidate) and manipulation of elections were common phenomenon in the 1990s. Further, the prosecution of the members of Sena were negligible and its members were frequently given bails after being arrested on various charges. In contrast, the members of left-wing extremist groups when held were often given death sentences.

According to one opinion, Ranvir Sena alone was responsible for raping more than 200 Dalit women including young girls of the age of 6 years to 70 years old elderly women. Between 1995 and 1999, it is estimated that they were also responsible for killing of more than 400 Dalits. Most of the carnage organised by the Sena took place in Bhojpur and Jahanabad districts.

==== Bathani Tola incident ====
In 1996, a group of armed men belonging to Ranvir Sena (comprising Rajput and Bhumihar men) rushed from Baraki Kharaon village of the Bhojpur district of Bihar towards Bathani Tola village, inhabited by Dalit and Muslim landless labourers. These men were armed with swords and guns and the subsequent attack by them on the village led to killing of 8 children, 12 women and 1 men, all belonging to poor strata of society. There were three police stations within a distance of 1 Kilometres from the village but despite the carnage being conducted for at least 2 hours, no policeman reached the village in order to prevent the crime. As per news reports, the perpetrators chopped off the breasts of a 25 years old women before killing her, an 18-year-old girl was gang-raped and a newborn was tossed in the air and slashed into two parts with swords.

This was a time, when political mobilisation of the upper caste landlords in the support of Ranvir Sena was taking place and major changes in the socio-economic condition of the Bihar was occurring. The organised communal massacre were becoming routine affairs according to the news reports and as per one opinion, these killings can be understood as assertion by the upper-caste to save their honour amidst the rising Backward Caste movement. As per a report, 16 years later, the Patna High Court acquitted all the accused of the massacre and interestingly no comments were made regarding the land order of the Bhojpur district, which was primary reason behind the communal massacre of 1996.

The village of Baraki Kharaon, which was adjacent to the village of Bathani Tola (a Dalit and Muslim inhabited area), was stronghold of Rajput and Bhumihar landlords. In the 1990s the movement for minimum wages reached its peak and the disenchanted agricultural labourers and poor people of the village and adjoining region started electing Communist leaders to the Panchayat and Legislative Assembly. The Rajput and Bhumihar landlords of the region were involved in illegal acquisition of the Panchayati land (land belonging to local bodies) and in the subsequent events in 1995, a local Imam Bara ( a place of worship for the Muslims) was occupied and destroyed. The Patna High Court gave verdict in the favour of Muslims and to implement the decision of the High Court, Dalits and Muslims had participated in Karbala Mukti Morcha (a rally to gain control of the illegally occupied land), in order to showcase the solidarity. This intensified the tension between the landlords and the Dalits leading to infamous carnage of 1996.

==== 1997 Ekwari incident ====
Ekwari village of the Bhojpur witnessed another scene of extremism in 1997, when the members of Ranvir Sena launched an attack on the lower caste villagers in collaboration with the police. As per the media reports and the account of the victims, the police forced the people to open the gates of their houses, conducted searching operations and left the way open for Sena members to perpetrate the massacre of the people belonging to Dalit communities belonging to Dhobi, Kahar, Chamar and Lohar caste. As per a report of The Telegraph, the attackers also raped two women; a 15-year-old girl and a pregnant woman, who was said to be a relative of Jai Kahar, a veteran CPI-ML activist. The rape was followed by killing of the two victims and a 10-year boy was also shot dead. A visit by Human Rights Watch team in 1998 to the village revealed that a police camp was established in the neighborhood of the village, but it was in the region inhabited by the Bhumihars. The residents of the victim village, particularly the leader of the lower-caste villagers also alleged that there exist collusion between the members of Ranvir Sena and the police. In his oral account to the team of Human Rights Watch, he said:

Police are here for law and order. They see what's going on, but they are allied with the Ranvir Sena. They get money and food from the forward castes so they favor the forward castes. The police don't care about the poor. We don't go to the police, nor any other state agencies. We asked for help from the Bhumihars to keep the killings low. They said they cannot control them even though the Bhumihar population belongs to the Ranvir Sena. We have no protection."

==== 1998 Nagri Baazar massacre ====
In May 1998, upper-caste landlords, in the Nagri Bazar village of the Bhojpur district of Bihar, gunned down 10 members of the Schedule Caste. The incident was reported to be a part of the regular skirmishes between the CPI(ML) and the Ranvir Sena, and some of the victims were reported to be the supporter of the former organization. As per news reports, most of the victims were wage labourers, share-croppers and small vendors. The 11 accused were charged and sentenced by the lower court. These included Chandra Bhushan Singh, Sudarshan Pandey and Ravindra Singh, who were sentenced to death by the trial court. While Arvind Pandey; Kameshwar Rai alias Kameshwar Singh; Sri Kant Pandey; Dadan Pandey; Salik Pandey alias Shaligram Pandey; Janeshwar Pandey; Anil Kumar Singh; and Virendra Pandey were handed life imprisonment. In 2013, the Patna High Court, acquitted the convicts, on the ground of lack of sufficient evidences, which resulted in fear and a sense of insecurity among the Dalits of the victim village.

As per news reports, the High Court rejected the evidences provided by brother of one of the victims. Umashankar, the brother of victim Sunil Kumar, who was shot dead, allegedly by the members of Ranvir Sena, claimed to be a witness of the incident. But, the High Court found his conduct to be indicative of his habit of falsely implicating the innocent persons.

=== Other significant incidents of violence by the Upper-Caste landlords ===
==== 1989 Danwar-Bihta and 1991 Deo-Saharia massacre ====
The two massacres were perpetrated by the same group of landlords, the "Jwala Singh group", which was active in Bhojpur region. In the 1990s, the elections to the legislative assembly or to the Parliament, were hardly free and fair, as explained by the contemporary media reports. The Ballot rigging events were common, and Dalits, who constituted approximately 14% of the state's population, were forcibly excluded by the landed castes from casting their votes. The incident of 1989, at Danwar-Bihta village, took place due to a clash between the Indian People's Front, a left-wing political party, supported by the Dalits and the Naxalites and Rajput landlords like Jwala Singh and his henchmen.

In the 1989 event, the attempt of upper-caste youths to capture the polling booth, during an election was negated by the Naxalites, who shot them dead in the daylight. The "Jwala Singh group" allegedly retaliated and gunned down large number of Dalit men and women. It was reported that, the Harijans in this area supported the ultra-left groups like Indian People's Front, because of the lack of empathy towards them on the part of Dalit leaders, after joining the mainstream politics. As per reports, in the infamous Danwar-Bihta incident, 23 Dalits were killed, while in the Deo-Sahiara incident, 14 more were killed, allegedly by Jwala Singh and his men.

The primary cause of the 1989 incident was attempt to exclude Dalits from voting, and subsequent skirmishes between Rajputs and Naxalites.In the 1991 event, however, the suspicions that the victim Dalits are murderers of three of the henchmen of local landlords, led to the midnight carnage. Even after being implicated in 1989 massacre, Jwala Singh managed to get "anticipatory bail", and ensured that, in the subsequent elections, not a single Dalit can vote.

== Dalits and Backward Castes after emergence of Naxalism ==
It was evident that the emergence of Naxalism in the plains of Bihar took place due to two main factors. The question of Ijjat (honour) was one of them. According to Gail Omvedt, in the central districts of Bihar the prevalent feudalism and electoral malpractices led a school teacher found the 'naxal movement of Bihar'. The Bhojpur district became the birthplace of Naxalism in Bihar due to various factors, most important being unequal distribution of the land and the frequent rapes of the Dalit women by the landlords of the Rajput and the Bhumihar castes. The founder of the movement was Jagdish Mahto. In the north Bihar, the Upper Castes represented the class which owned most of the land and other castes including the Upper-Backwards and Schedule Castes represented the land-scarce group, while the situation was entirely different in central Bihar, where the "land reforms" had brought to the fore new landlords, who hailed from the Backward Castes.

In some of the districts like Aurangabad district of Bihar, the forces of Dalits against the Upper Caste landlords belonging to Rajput caste were led by the peasant communities like the Koeris and the Yadavs from the front, with large presence of Dalits behind them.

=== Confrontation with the Backward Caste landlords ===
Naksaliyon ki ek hi dawai
Chhah inch chhota kr do bhai

— Slogan raised by Bhumi Sena.

It was not only the caste armies of the upper-caste landlords which perpetrated the caste based atrocities on the Dalits, but also that of Backward Castes like Kurmis. In a village called Dumri, located in Jehanabad district of Bihar, the Kurmi were considered as the "dominant caste", just like the other villages of the district and all the households belonging to the Kurmi caste were owners of vast stretches of land. It was natural ground for the Bhumi Sena— a caste army of Kurmi landlords to strengthen its root here. Alarmed by the killing of the prominent Kurmi landlords, Bhumi Sena was formed in Punpun-Masaurhi region of the Patna district in 1982 and soon after its formation it arrived in the Dumari village. There were also some sympathizers of the Maoists and the "Dalit resurgence" among the members of Kurmi caste. These were primarily the poor Kurmis, who were at an unprivileged position in the village of Dumri due to their low socio-economic status. The Bhumi Sena targeted not only the Dalits but also those members of Kurmi caste, who sympathized with the latter and were part of the Maoist movement.

The Sena not only forced the Kurmi households to give "protection money" and support to its cadres but also tried to radicalise the Kurmi youths in the name of saving the 'prestige and pride' of the community. Slogans were raised to woo the community to fight the Maoists. The absence of Brahmins in the village and due to presence of limited number of households of the Rajput and the Bhumihars, the Kurmis were at the top of caste hierarchy in the village.The Dalits which included castes like Chamar, Dusadh, Musahar, Dhobi and Dome were at the bottom of this hierarchy and the Kurmis, whom they refer to as Zamindar and Malik, imposed on them all those discriminatory practices which the upper-caste landlords applied in other areas of Bihar. This includes getting up from their cot, when the Kurmi Malik passed by, even in their own homes. They were also not allowed to wear watches or sandles.

Despite the struggle between the Kurmis and the Dalits in this village, some Kurmi youths were sympathetic to the Dalits and ironically the Maoist first came into the village on invitation of a Kurmi youth, who was a member of Socialist Party and a sympathiser of the Dalits. Some landlords from the Kurmi caste even claimed that the arrival of Maoists in the village was not due to any form of oppression but due to factional fights amongst the Kurmis themselves. They also claimed that the bringing of Maoists in the village was aimed at establishing the supremacy of the other group of rival Kurmis, who were against the peaceful co-existence of the farmers and the labourers.

The struggle here was led by an organisation called Mazdoor Kisan Sangram Samiti (MKSS), a front organization of CPI (ML) Party Unity. Most of the Dalits joined the struggle under the aegis of MKSS and while its president Dr. Vinayan was from Uttar Pradesh, its vice president was a person from the Kurmi caste from Jehanabad itself. The ordinary people didn't draw a distinction between the Party Unity and the MKSS, and they used a collective term Sangathan, to denote the two groups. However, the activities and composition of the two groups were different.

"Mazdur kisan bhai bhai;
Naxali beech main kahanse aayi?"

— Slogan raised by the Kurmi landlords of Dumari village.

The Party Unity maintained its own armed squad and mostly drew its membership from the Dalits. The commander of the armed squad was a Dalit named Raju Bhai. The Party Unity's first armed intervention in the village of Dumri took place in 1981, in support of a strike organised by the MKSS. The MKSS preferred the mass protests and economic blockade of the landlords, as their method to show the dissension against the feudal setup.

The caste strife was witnessed between the Dalit Maoists and the Kurmi landlords in 1981, when a Kurmi landlord called Munna Singh, who operated a brick kiln, refused to increase the wages of his Dalit labourers. In order to keep the Kiln functioning amidst the protest organised by Dalit labourers under the banner of MKSS, he brought his own gunmen and other labourers. The Dalit protesters tried to stop new workers from operating the kiln, as a response to which, the gunmen opened fire. The PU armed squad also retaliated from the homes of the Dalits, and a gun battle ensued. A landlord was killed and Maoists hunged his head on a tree. The battle was followed by the policy of "selective annihilation", in which most oppressive landlords were killed one after another. It was this policy of annihilation that led to the rise of Bhumi Sena— the caste army of Kurmi landlords.

By the end of 1982, the retaliatory action by the Bhumi Sena, and the activity of Police in the region, led to the weakening of Maoists. The Bhumi Sena forced many Dalits and the Kurmis, who sympathised with them, to leave the region and migrate elsewhere. The Maoist guriella now resorted to "economic blockade" and selective killing once again, and in a short period of time, as many as 16 landlords were killed. By 1984, the tactics followed by the Maoists, of burning the stores of grain of the Kurmis, broke the resistance on latter's part. The Kurmis resolved to stop this fight with the Sangathan and the terms of surrender were decided. Pradeep Das, a Dalit leader, from the Ravidasi community, organised the surrender of the Kurmi landlords, in which the latter gave written confirmation to the MKSS, that they will not wage a war against it and will not interfere in its activities. The surrender led to an end of all the feudal practices and discrimination, and a Dalit leadership emerged in the village as a challenge to Kurmi dominance.

In the Magadhi region of Bihar, it had been observed that the villages with mixed population of different communities were more inclined to violence against Dalits when compared to the villages which had population of only upper castes and Dalits. The villages having Koeris as dominant caste with good numbers of Dalit population were equally vulnerable to violence and land dispute with Dalits.

==== 1977 Belchhi massacre ====
Belchi is a village located in the Patna district, and in the 1970s, Kurmis happened to be the "dominant caste" here. The village has a nominal presence of upper-castes, and the "educational mobility" between the upper-caste was also nominal, contrary to the other caste groups, like the Scheduled Caste and the middle range castes, in which Kurmis were included. The region was known as "Kurmistan" (land of Kurmis), and the peasants of the Kurmi community had become landlords, with complete monopoly over the agricultural land, as a result of their flourishing business of Onion and Potato cultivation, which brought surplus income to them. They owned most of the cold storage, trucks and brick-kilns in the area and the dominance of armed gangsters like Indradeo Chaudhary, Mahavir Mahto and Parsuram Dhanuk, also bolstered the preponderance of Kurmis over the region.

Of the Schedule Caste groups, the Paswans and the Musahars, were numerically important. The Dalits were led by Singheshwar Paswan, popularly known as "Singhwa", who according to several accounts, didn't like the exploitation of Dalits. He was also reported to be involved in a murder. Singhwa challenged Mahavir Mahto and the "Kurmi dominance", and this became the root cause of the 1977 event, which drew nationwide attention. Singhwa mobilised his friends and his castemen, and asserted himself before the Kulaks of the Kurmi caste, which led to threats and intimidation by the latter; he was warned and the Kulaks, showing a potential threat in him, decided to eliminate him at all.

In May 1977, a gang under the leadership of Indradeo Chaudhary, Mahavir Mahto and Parsuram Dhanuk attacked Singhwa. The Dusadhs and Musahar, retaliated by firing at the attacking party and pelted stones at them, emboldened by the initial victory, they were to take a step ahead, but soon, another gang emerged from the Mahavir's house, and to save themselves, the "pupils of Singhwa" rushed towards Rohan Mahto's house and locked themselves in. The massacre took place after the "hiding party" was forced out of the house by the armed men belonging to the three gangs, and the shooting of the eleven people was followed by the burning all of them in funeral pyre, prepared by the Kurmis, who stood nearby as the witnesses. Arun Ranjan reports the event as follows:

One by one 50-60 men armed with rifles streamed into the house. Eleven persons including Sindhwa, were marched in a procession to an open field, their hands tied behind their backs. The women and children of Kurmi families frantically scampered around collecting firewood and hay to put together a pyre. And then right before the eyes of 300 people each one of the 11 captives was first shot dead and thrown into the fire. But eye witnesses say that Keshto Sonar writhing with pain jumped out of the fire. and caught hold of a Mahto by neck. He was overpowered and once again thrown into fire. A 14-year old innocent boy, Raja Ram again and again jumped off the pyre and he was promptly thrown back into the fire. The killer-gang went on roasting human flesh till 5 p.m. They ran away when the police arrived. Four young members of Paswan family and three brothers from a Sonar family were consigned to the fire.

Different opinions surfaced after the massacre. For some, like Charan Singh, the former Prime Minister of Government of India, it was not an issue of "feudal dominance" of the one caste over another, and [it] was merely a conflict between two criminal gangs. Others, however, dispute this view. The incident saw death on people, who primarily belonged to Dalit castes, but along with them, some of the Backward Caste people, belonging to Sonar caste were also killed. Singhwa is said to have mobilised people belonging to other castes as well, in opposition to the tyrant attitude of the Kurmi landlords, who according to the reports, colluded with the local police force, on many occasions. The rigging of polling booth, during elections and the virtual control of the infrastructure like roads on occasions, was also common for the Kurmis. Singhwa was also supported by a Brahmin, who had faced the wrath of Kumis in the past. According to Lal (1981):

"A Brahmin whose wife was mercilessly beaten by the leader of the Kurmis in the village was so pleased that he honoured Singhwa by offering sacred thread to him."

==== 1980 Pipra massacre ====
Pipra was one of the large-scale massacres committed on untouchables by Kurmis within a time span of two and a half years, the previous ones being Belchi in 1977 and Bishrampur in 1978. Pipra was a village in Punpun division of Patna district in Bihar. The conflict happened because of a land dispute between two communities of Kurmi and Chamar. Historically, the village of Pipra was owned by Muslims who had left the place after independence. As per Chamars, during communal violence of 1947, the Muslims who were departing from the village were provided safe refuge by Chamars and the Muslims in return had rewarded them with a four bigha of land. According to them, the Kurmis through various means had occupied all of the land in the village and only a small plot of land remained with their community. In the subsequent period, the status of Kurmis in the village had also changed from being labourers in the fields of Muslims to the landowners employing labourers. Kurmis on their part claimed that they had purchased the land from the Muslims who left the village.

The situation in the village was tense for quite a period of time. There was also a sexual scandal involving Kurmi landowner named Radhika Singh and a Chamar woman. the Chamars were angry over it. The political discourse in the village was also impacted by Naxalite related conflicts in the surrounding regions. The Chamars had also stopped working for Kurmis over the issue of poor wages. Before the massacre, two Kurmi landlords named Bhola Singh and Deonandan Singh of Kisan Suraksha Sangh were killed in December 1979 and January 1980 respectively. The Kurmis in the village suspected some involvement of Chamars into the incident. On the night of 25/26 February 1980, in a carefully organised manner 500 Kurmis from many villages descended on two Chamar houses and shot dead four men, four women, three boys and three girls. The bodies of the dead along with their houses and cattles were put on fire. The mob had left the village before police arrived at crime scene in the next morning.

=== Backward Castes in the Dalit-Naxal movement ===
The broad categorisation of the various caste groups in North India falls in three categories. The upper-caste or the Forward Castes, who constituted some big Zamindars, but most of the landowners from the upper-caste had such landholdings, which might qualify them as belonging to the "middle peasants" category. In fact, their landholdings, barring some exceptions were identical to the intermediate caste groups of Koeri, Kurmi and the Yadavs—another category of castes, who fall within the categorisation of Other Backward Class. The economic status of majority of the upper-castes, thus, was similar to the middle peasants from these Backward Castes.

The caste was the most important unifier at the rural level for the upper-castes, as on the question of "wage suppression" and making the hiring of Dalit labours affordable for the farming families of their caste, the upper-castes had common opinion. On these questions, even poorest of the poor upper-caste families united with the prosperous families of their own caste. On the other hand, many OBCs, who owned no land, worked along with Dalits as the agricultural labourers without much interaction with them on the social level. However, some of the landed families of the Backward Castes also shared same interest with the farming families of the upper-caste, on the question of wages and affordability of the agricultural labourers. This section of the Backward Castes complained that due to Maoists the availability of cheap labour for the commencement of farming operations has become difficult. But, above all, the social interaction and alliance of upper-caste and the Backward Castes were not viable, because of the taboos related to inter-caste marriages and the social interaction between them.

The Maoists primarily considered the landed gentry from the upper-caste as the class enemy of the Dalits and the poor. They mobilised the landless agricultural labourers from the Dalit communities as well as the Backward Castes. Though, some of the rich farmers from the Backward Castes were anti-Maoist, given the economic prosperity they achieved in the years after independence. The Maoist considered the Backward Castes as the sympathetic group for the cause of Dalits and the landless labourers. The Maoists, hence, recruited from the Backward Castes as well, apart from the Dalits.

A report published by the Communist Party of India (Marxist–Leninist) Liberation, titled Reports From The Flaming Fields Of Bihar, asserts that the unity with the middle peasant castes like the Koeris develops easily because of the position of these castes in the social hierarchy and their status in the rural power relation. It identifies that being hard-working nature and sufferers of both the discrimination (by the upper-caste landlords) and the widespread dacoity, as the primary reason behind attraction of these castes to the revolutionary movement. The report also outlines that barring some exceptions, Yadavs also serve as good allies of the Leftists.

CPI(ML)’S APPEAL TO KURMI PEASANTS

Dear Peasants,

THE Kurmi caste is well known as an honest, hard-working and brave caste. It has produced quite a considerable number of progressive individuals and revolutionaries. Many whole-time cadres of our Party hail from your caste. Many leaders and cadres, like Mahendra Singh, Sachchidanand Singh and Shyamnarayan Patel, of democratic organisations, like the IPF or the Kisan Sabha, also belong to your caste. Altogether, your caste is held in high esteem in the whole society.

Our Party is leading the people towards a revolutionary transformation of the entire society, and you are an integral part of the people. But some persons are out to drive a wedge between us by giving you a false impression about our Party. We admit that we had made certain mistakes in the past, but we have already rectified them. Undoubtedly, some shortcomings may still be there and you are absolutely welcome to point them out, but please know us closely and don't misunderstand us. We are consistently fighting for your all-round development.

Now, some arch-reactionaries and their goons, who also happen to come mainly from the Kurmi caste, have formed a gang like the Bhoomi Sena that is out to perpetuate your deprivation and backwardness and to make life hell for you. And some persons are associating your entire caste with this notorious gang to tarnish your great image. You must be knowing it very well what a tremendous hatred the people have for this Bhoomi Sena. Do you not want to preserve the respect the people have always shown towards your caste? Do you not want to prosper economically, socially, politically and culturally? Do you not want to break out of this bondage of backwardness? Surely you do, and we, therefore, appeal to you to isolate and smash this notorious gang and to march forward to a better tomorrow. And in this forward march towards the fulfilment of your just aspirations, you can always count on our fullest help and cooperation.

Just think how many progressive individuals and revolutionaries have been murdered by this gang and what a great loss it has inflicted on the people. They have snatched away from you such beloved mass leaders as Premchand Sinha, Lalbabu Singh and Sharda Singh. This gang is indeed a disgrace to the entire society and as such it is imperative to wipe it out completely from the face of this earth.

As far as we are concerned, we associate only Girish Singh, Lallu Singh, Beni Singh, Jeevlal Singh and Vijay Singh with the Bhoomi Sena. They are the main enemy in this area and we will not spare them. If anyone else has, by mistake, aligned himself with these elements, he should dissociate himself immediately. We bear no enmity towards anybody else. However, in the interest of the masses, particularly of the Kurmi caste, we are prepared to work out a compromise with these elements and avoid bloodshed if possible. We will not take any action against them till 31 March and wait for their response. But if we do not get any response from them by 30 March, we will assume that they do not want any compromise, they do not have any sympathy for the Kurmi peasants and want to play with their lives. After that we will be free to mobilise the masses in any action against this gang of five.

Peasants of the Kurmi caste, unite with the peasants of all other castes. No caste can prosper in isolation. Landlords of all castes are getting united. You, too, must take immediate steps. You must make your choice between light and darkness. Our Party is also your Party, and it will remain yours for ever.

Communist Party of India (Marxist-Leninist) (Liberation)
15 February 1986

== Socio-political empowerment ==
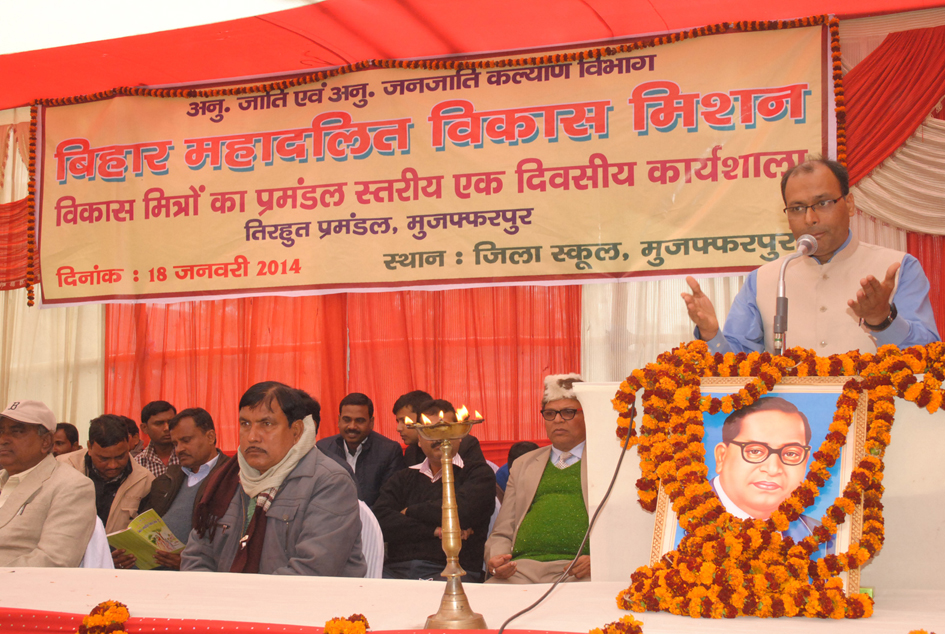
A program organised for the Mahadalit communities, by the department for welfare of Scheduled Castes and Scheduled Tribes, Government of Bihar (2014)

The Nitish Kumar government in Bihar identified the most deprived of the Dalits, by categorising the Dalit castes into two categories. A new category of Mahadalits was created, containing castes on the state list of Scheduled Castes, other than the Dusadh, Chamar, Pasi and Dhobi caste. Since these four castes were better placed than rest of the Dalit communities, in terms of taking benefits of the reservation policy of the government, and were more politically conscious, a need for sub-categorisation of the SCs arose. An organisation called Mahadalit Vikas Mission was also created to enlist the Dalit castes on the basis of their socio-economic deprivation.
