= Belchhi massacre =

1977 caste-based killings in Bihar, India

- Date: 27 May 1977
- Time: 11 am IST
- Location: Belchhi, Patna district, Bihar, India
- Cause: Caste-related violence
- Deaths: 11
- Accused: Mahavir Mahato and associates (Kurmi caste)
- Charges: Slaughter
- Verdict: 2 death sentences, 9 life sentences

Belchhi massacre was a caste-based mass killing that took place on 27 May 1977 in the village of Belchhi in Patna district, Bihar, India. Eleven people, including eight Dalits (from the Paswan caste) and three from the Sunar caste (a backward caste), were murdered by a mob allegedly led by Mahavir Mahato, a landlord from the Kurmi caste. The attack drew national attention for its brutality and its political ramifications during the post-Emergency period in India.

== Incident ==
On the morning of 27 May 1977, around 11 am, a gang of 60–70 men surrounded Belchhi village. Armed with weapons, they targeted members of the Dalit and backward communities. Eleven individuals were shot, their hands tied, and burned alive on a common pyre. According to accounts, the assailants reportedly feasted near the flames as the victims perished.

== Socio-political context ==
During the 1970s, Belchi was a predominantly Kurmi-dominated village in Patna district, with minimal presence of upper castes and limited educational mobility among them. In contrast, lower castes such as the Dalits and middle-ranking backward castes had begun to experience upward mobility. The Kurmi community, owing to economic prosperity through potato and onion cultivation, had risen to dominance, earning the region the informal name "Kurmistan" (land of the Kurmis). They controlled much of the agrarian economy, including cold storage units, transport fleets, and brick kilns. Local gangster figures such as Indradeo Chaudhary, Mahavir Mahto, and Parsuram Dhanuk further consolidated Kurmi dominance.

Among the Dalits, the Paswan and Musahar communities were numerically significant. The Dalit movement in the area was led by Singheshwar Paswan—popularly known as Singhwa—who opposed the exploitation by dominant castes and emerged as a symbol of assertion. He reportedly had a criminal background, but his defiance of landlord authority gained him a wide following. Singhwa's mobilisation of lower caste allies and his challenge to Kurmi hegemony led to escalating tensions. This culminated in his targeting by armed Kurmi gangs.

In May 1977, a violent clash unfolded when armed Kurmi groups attacked Singhwa. Although initially resisted by members of the Dusadh and Musahar communities, a second group of attackers forced Singhwa's supporters to take refuge in a Kurmi household. They were later discovered, captured, and executed. Eleven individuals were shot and burned alive on a funeral pyre reportedly constructed by Kurmi women and children. Eyewitness accounts describe extreme brutality—some victims attempted to escape the fire but were forcibly thrown back into the flames.

The massacre sparked widespread public reaction. While leaders such as former Prime Minister Charan Singh dismissed it as a gang conflict, others saw it as a stark instance of caste-based feudal violence. Reports suggest the Kurmi landlords often collaborated with local police, controlled polling booths during elections, and exerted infrastructural dominance over the region. Singhwa's support extended beyond Dalits; a local Brahmin, whose wife had been beaten by a Kurmi leader, reportedly honoured Singhwa by offering him the sacred thread—a symbolic gesture that underlined cross-caste solidarity in resisting oppression.

For broader context, the Belchhi massacre forms part of a continuum of violence against marginalised communities in Bihar. Such incidents reflect the historical patterns of caste oppression and resistance that have shaped the region's socio-political landscape.

== Aftermath ==
=== Indira Gandhi's visit ===
At the time, Indira Gandhi was out of power after the Congress Party's defeat in the 1977 general elections. On 13 August 1977, she decided to visit Belchhi to meet the survivors. Due to monsoon floods and poor road access, she famously travelled the final stretch of the journey on elephant-back. The image of her riding into the village became a political and symbolic turning point, helping her rebuild public sympathy and reframe her image.

Her visit brought unprecedented media attention to the massacre and spurred a government response. Then Chief Minister Jagannath Mishra ordered action, including establishing a police station, a post office, and a block office in the village.

== Legal proceedings ==
Survivor Janaki Paswan's testimony proved pivotal in the investigation. Based on her statement, two perpetrators were sentenced to death, while nine others received life imprisonment. In 1982, the Patna High Court handed down the death penalties, which were later upheld by a bench of the Supreme Court of India led by Justice Syed Murtaza Fazl Ali in 1983.

This verdict is considered a landmark in Indian judicial history, as one of the rare instances where capital punishment was upheld in a caste-based atrocity case.

== Causes ==
The root causes of the massacre were longstanding caste tensions over land and wages. A major trigger was the rebellion of a Dalit leader named Singhwa, which led to his murder and eventually the mass retaliation by upper-caste landlords.

== In popular culture ==
In 1979, acclaimed Hindi writer Mannu Bhandari published Mahabhoj (translated as "The Grand Feast"), a political novel inspired by the Belchhi massacre. The story follows Bisu, a young Dalit activist whose investigation into caste atrocities ends in tragedy. Set against an electoral backdrop, the novel critiques political opportunism and systemic failure.

The novel was later adapted for the stage by Amal Allana for the National School of Drama, receiving critical acclaim for its hard-hitting narrative and depiction of Dalit struggles.

The 2025 Hindi film Emergency also features the Belchhi massacre as a pivotal moment that reshaped Indira Gandhi's post-Emergency political strategy.

== See also ==
- Caste-related violence in Bihar
- Dalits in Bihar
- Emergency (India)
