= Kameshwar =

Kameshwar is a given name. Notable people with the name include:

- Kameshwar Baitha (born 1956), member of the 15th Lok Sabha of India
- Kameshwar Brahma (born 1940), awarded Padma Shri by Indian government
- Kameshwar Choupal (1956–2025), Indian politician
- Kameshwar Pandit, (died 2001), Indian politician, trade unionist and journalist
- Kameshwar Paswan (1941–2018), Indian politician
- Kameshwar Poolla, professor at University of California, Berkeley
- Kameshwar Prasad, Indian neurologist, medical researcher, academic
- Kameshwar Prasad Singh, Indian politician and a member of Indian parliament
- Kameshwar Singh, K.C.I.E. (1907–1962), the Maharaja of Darbhanga
- Kameshwar Thakur, the first king of the Oiniwar Dynasty in the Mithila Kingdom
- Kameshwar C. Wali (1927–2022), Indian-born American theoretical physicist
- Kameshwar Yadav (died 2024), Indian politician and Hindutva activist

== See also ==
- Kameshwar Singh Darbhanga Sanskrit University in Bihar, India, dedicated to the teaching of Sanskrit
