= Banshipur, Arrah =

- village
- Location in Bihar, India Banshipur, Arrah (India)
- Coordinates: 25.670178°N 84.351392°E
- Country: India
- State: Bihar
- District: Bhojpur

Languages
  - Official: Bhojpuri, Hindi
- Time zone: UTC+5:30 (IST)
- PIN: 802112
- ISO 3166 code: IN-BR
- Vehicle registration: BR-03

Banshipur village is located in Shahpur block of Bhojpur district of Bihar. It has a total of 154 families and a population of 1220. There are several communities, but the Brahmans are in majority. Other castes include Yadav (OBC), Bania (OBC), and Dusadh (SC). The nearest market, bus stand, banks, and high school are approximately at 600m in Karnamepur Bazaar. It has only one primary school.

The nearest villages are Mahuar (West), Karnamepur (East), Dalan Chhapra (South), and Dilmanpur (North). The nearest railway station is Banahi.

== Administration ==
Banshipur village is administered by Gram Pradhan through its Gram Panchayat, who is elected representative of village as per constitution of India and Panchyati Raj Act.

Particulars	Total	Male	Female
no. of houses	154		
population	1220	649	571
