= 1989 Bhagalpur violence =

Communal violence in India

1989 Bhagalpur riots
- Part of Religious violence in India
- Location of the Bhagalpur district in Bihar, India
- Date: October–November 1989
- Location: Bhagalpur district, Bihar India
- Methods: Killing, arson and looting

Parties
Hindus	Muslims

Casualties and losses
Unknown (the total dead numbered around 1000, around 900 were Muslims; it was difficult to establish the religious identity of other victims)	Around 900 killed

Key areas affected during the 1989 violence in Bhagalpur district, Bihar

The Bhagalpur violence of 1989 took place between Hindus and Muslims in the Bhagalpur district of Bihar, India. The violence started on 24 October 1989, and the violent incidents continued for 2 months, affecting the Bhagalpur city and 250 villages around it. The victims were mainly Muslims. Over 1,000 people were killed (around 900 of which were Muslims), and another 50,000 were displaced as a result of the violence. Alternative sources place the casualty figure at nearly 2,000, with a PUDR report stating that 93% of the victims were Muslim. It was the worst instance of Hindu-Muslim violence in independent India at the time.

== Background ==
Bhagalpur has a history of communal violence. In 1989, tensions between Hindus and Muslims escalated during the Muharram and Bisheri Puja festivities in August.

In 1989, as part of the Ram Janmabhoomi campaign, which aimed to construct a Hindu temple at Ayodhya in place of the Babri mosque, the Vishwa Hindu Parishad (VHP) had organized a Ramshila procession in Bhagalpur. The procession aimed to collect bricks (shilas) for the proposed Ram temple at Ayodhya. One such procession passing through Fatehpur village provoked brickbatting and arson on 22 October. Prior to the outbreak of the riots, two false rumors about the killing of Hindu students started circulating: one rumor stated that nearly 200 Hindu university students had been killed by the Muslims, while another rumor stated that 31 Hindu boys had been murdered with their bodies dumped in a well at the Sanskrit College. Apart from these, political and criminal rivalries in the area had played a role in inciting the riots.

== The trigger ==
Relations between the Hindu and Muslim communities had already deteriorated following the unsolved killing of a Muslim rickshaw driver during the August 20 Hindu Bihula procession. On 24 October 1989, the Ramshila processions from the various parts of the district were to proceed to the Gaushala area, from where they would move on to Ayodhya. The procession coming from Parbatti area passed peacefully through Tatarpur, a Muslim-dominated area, after its leader Mahadev Prasad Singh told the Hindus not to raise any provocative slogans.

Sometime later, another procession from Nathnagar arrived at Tatarpur. This massive procession was escorted for safety by the police, in the presence of the Superintendent of Police KS Dwivedi. Some members of the procession shouted slogans such as Hindi, Hindu, Hindustan, Mullah Bhago Pakistan ("India is for Hindus, Mullahs go away to Pakistan"), Baccha baccha Ram ka, baaki sab haraam ka ("We are all children of Ram, the rest are illegitimate"), and Babur ki auladon, bhago Pakistan ya Kabristan ("Children of Babur, run away to Pakistan or to the graveyard"). The District Magistrate (DM) Arun Jha stopped the procession at the Parbatti-Tatarpur junction. The DM then requested the Muslims to allow the procession to pass through Tatarpur, but the Muslims refused and suggested that the procession take an alternative route to Gaushala.

As the discussions were going on, crude bombs were thrown at the procession. It was alleged that they came from the premises of a nearby high school, though according to several sources, the origin of the bombs could not be traced. Although no one was killed in the bombing, 11 policemen suffered minor injuries. The outbreak of communal violence in Bhagalpur on 24 October 1989 was precipitated by false rumors spread by criminal elements. These included claims that Muslims had killed nearly 200 Hindu students in lodges near the university, as well as reports that the bodies of 31 murdered Hindu boys had been dumped in a well at Sanskrit College. Although both allegations were later proven entirely unfounded, they significantly fueled the escalation of violence. Subsequent investigations revealed that 12 bodies were recovered rather than the rumored 200, all belonging to the family of Mohammad Javed. This is considered as the event which triggered these riots.

== The riots ==
A curfew was imposed by the state government immediately in the afternoon of October 24, and all the civilian assemblies were declared illegal. When the police opened fire to disperse the crowd at Tatarpur, bombs were hurled at the District Magistrate, the Superintendent of Police, the other administration officials and the police. The police fired more rounds, leading to the deaths of 2 people. Meanwhile, the Hindu procession retreated from the Parbatti-Tatarpur junction, and turned into a mob which attacked shops owned by the Muslims on the Nathnagar road (later renamed to Lord Mahavir Path). Hindu rioters also attempted to storm the Muslim-dominated locality of Assanandpur, but the Muslims there fired at them from the rooftops. The mob then turned to the Hindu-dominated locality Parbatti, where it massacred at least 40 Muslims. As the news of the violence reached the other Ramshila processions at Gaushala, the Hindus went on a rampage, killing Muslims, looting their shops and destroying their property.

On 25 October, an 8,000-strong mob looted and destroyed Madaninagar, a Muslim settlement, turning it into a ghost town. They also attacked Kanjhiagram, a nearby locality. Bhatoria, a Muslim-dominated village was attacked on October 25, and again on October 27, killing several Muslims. In Hasnabad, the Shahi Masjid built during Aurangazeb's reign was damaged. Upon immediate request from the state government, the Army was called in on October 26. KS Dwivedi, the Police Superintendent accused of being anti-Muslim, was asked by the Bihar Chief Minister Satyendra Narayan Sinha to hand over the charge to Ajit Datt on the same day. However, during a tour of the riot-affected area, the Prime Minister Rajiv Gandhi overruled Dwivedi's transfer at the demand of a mob composed of policemen and VHP supporters.

On 26 October, at least 11 Muslims were killed in the Brahmin-dominated Parandarpur village. The same day, 18 Muslims including 11 children were killed in full public view, in the Nayabazar area of Bhagalpur. Around 44 Muslims, including 19 children, were provided refuge by some local Hindus in the Jamuna Kothi building. At 11:30 am, a 70-strong mob entered the Jamuna Kothi with swords, axes, hammers and lathis. Within 10 minutes, 18 Muslims were killed. Some of the children were beheaded, some had their limbs cut off while the others were thrown off the third floor. A woman called Bunni Begum had her breasts chopped off. Some other Muslims who had been provided refuge by the Hindus in the neighbouring buildings, managed to survive. In Assanandpur, Muslims also escorted several hostel-resident Hindu students to safety.

Hindustan, a Hindi daily in the state capital Patna, reported that on 31 October, the army soldiers had recovered Pakistan-made arms and ammunition from some miscreants in the Tatarpur area. However, the District Magistrate Arun Jha dismissed the report as "sheer nonsense", and termed the 'foreign hand' theory as "silly".

=== Chandheri massacre ===
The Chandheri (also spelled Chanderi) village was attacked from three sides by the people from the adjoining villages on the evening of 27 October. The Yadavs of the neighbouring settlement had disapproved of the construction of a mosque in the village. The attackers set the mosque on the fire, along with some houses, killing 5 people. A Jammu and Kashmir Light Infantry regiment, led by Major G.P.S. Virk and stationed at the Sabaur thana, was overseeing Chandheri and the neighbouring settlement of Rajpur. When Major Virk arrived at the village, he found that some of the Muslims had fled to the neighboring villages, while around 125 of them were hiding in a large house belonging to one Sheikh Minnat. He provided them with police protection, and left with an assurance that he would return in the morning with an army unit to evacuate them to safety. In the early next morning, a large number of Yadavs, Dusadhs and Kurmis arrived at Sheikh Mannat's house. They claimed that they had come to evacuate the Muslims. However, as soon as the Muslims came out, they were attacked: some were killed on the spot, while the others were paraded to a hyacinth pond before being attacked.

When Major Virk returned to Chandheri at 9:38 am on 28 October, he found the house vacant. At the pond, he found Malika Bano, a survivor whose right leg had been chopped off. 61 mutilated dead bodies were recovered from the pond. The police later filed charges against 38 people in the case, out of which 16 were convicted and awarded rigorous life terms; the other 22 were acquitted.

=== Logain massacre ===
At the village of Logain, 116 Muslims were killed by a 4000-strong mob led by ASI Ramachander Singh . Their bodies were buried and camouflaged by the plantation of cauliflower and cabbage saplings to hide the evidence. 14 people, including the former police officer, were convicted and sentenced to rigorous life imprisonment for the killings, in 2007.

In March 2025, amid the Nagpur violence, some right-wing social media handles shared images of cauliflowers, evoking the Logain massacre. In May 2025, Karnataka BJP's official account on X posted a meme celebrating the killing of Maoists in Chhattisgarh, which also had the cauliflower reference. In November 2025, after a landslide NDA victory in the 2025 Bihar Legislative Assembly election, Ashok Singhal, a BJP cabinet minister from Assam, posted an image of a cauliflower field on X with the caption "Bihar approves Gobi farming." The post drew condemnation from two members of Parliament who argued that it glorified the Logain massacre and promoted hatred of Muslims.

== Aftermath ==
A three-member Commission of Inquiry was set up by the Bihar State Government consisting of Bihar High Court Judges C.P. Sinha and S. Samshul Hassan to investigate the riots. The Commission submitted its final report in year 1995 and blamed several police officers, including the superintendent of police KS Dwivedi, for failing to stop the violence. A second round of violence happened in March 1990.

142 FIRs were recorded in various police stations. 1,283 persons were accused. 535 cases out of the 864 cases filed were closed, and most of the accused were acquitted for the lack of evidence. The victims accused the Congress government of doing little to stop the riots, and also of not providing them with adequate relief and rehabilitation. The riots happened during the tenure of the Chief Minister Satyendra Narayan Sinha, who stepped down. To pacify the Muslims, the Congress replaced him with Jagannath Mishra, who had become popular in the Muslim community ever since he made Urdu one of the official languages of the State.

In his autobiography Meri Yaadein, Meri bhoolein, Sinha accused his Congress colleagues of "fanning" the riots out of personal jealousy and ill-will, specifically mentioning the former chief minister Bhagwat Jha Azad and the former speaker Shivchandra Jha. He also accused the Prime Minister Rajiv Gandhi of overruling his order to transfer the then superintendent of police K S Dwivedi without consulting him, although Dwivedi had completely failed to control the riots. He alleged that the decision was "not only an encroachment of the Constitutional right of the state government but also a step detrimental to ongoing efforts to ease tensions". Sinha also stated that after being dismissed as the Chief Minister, he informed Rajiv Gandhi about the "role of some Congress leaders" in the riots.

The Muslims in Bihar had traditionally served as a Congress (I) vote bank, but after the 1989 violence, they shifted their loyalty to Lalu Prasad Yadav, who became the Chief Minister of the state in 1990. However, the subsequent governments were also accused of not meting out the justice. The survivors accused Lalu Prasad Yadav of not punishing the rioters because many of them belonged to his own caste.

On 12 May 2005, a Bhagalpur court sentenced 10 people to life imprisonment on 12 May for the murder of five Muslims in Kamarganj village of the district in the riots.

When Nitish Kumar became the Chief Minister, he ordered 27 cases to be reopened for investigation in 2006. This led to the re-trial of Kameshwar Yadav, who had earlier been acquitted and given a citation by the state police for "maintaining communal harmony". He was convicted for killing of 15-year old Mohammad Qayyum. However, in 2017, he was acquitted by the Patna High Court. It was alleged that he "benefited from his proximity to both RJD and BJP and, most importantly, due to JD(U)’s alliance with these parties and the Congress." After his acquittal, he expressed his desire to contest elections on a Bhartiya Janata Party ticket.

In 2007, 14 others were convicted for their roles in the Logain massacre. A number of victims were compensated in 2012 by the State Government.

In the aftermath of communal violence in Nagpur in 2025, fact-checking website Altnews.in reported that social media users with Hindutva sympathies posted images of cauliflower plantations, described as a subtle reminder of the Logain massacre, in which Cauliflowers were planted over the bodies of slain Muslims.

=== NN Singh Enquiry Commission Report ===
Soon after coming to power in November 2005, Nitish Kumar set up the Bhagalpur Riots Probe Commission under Justice N. N. Singh to probe the riots. The Commission submitted its 1000-page report in February 2015; the report was presented in the Bihar Legislative Assembly on 7 August 2015. It held the inaction by the then Congress government, the local administration and the police responsible for the deadly clashes.
