= Raja Salhesh Mandir =

Hindu temples in Mithila region

- राजा सलहेश मंदिर
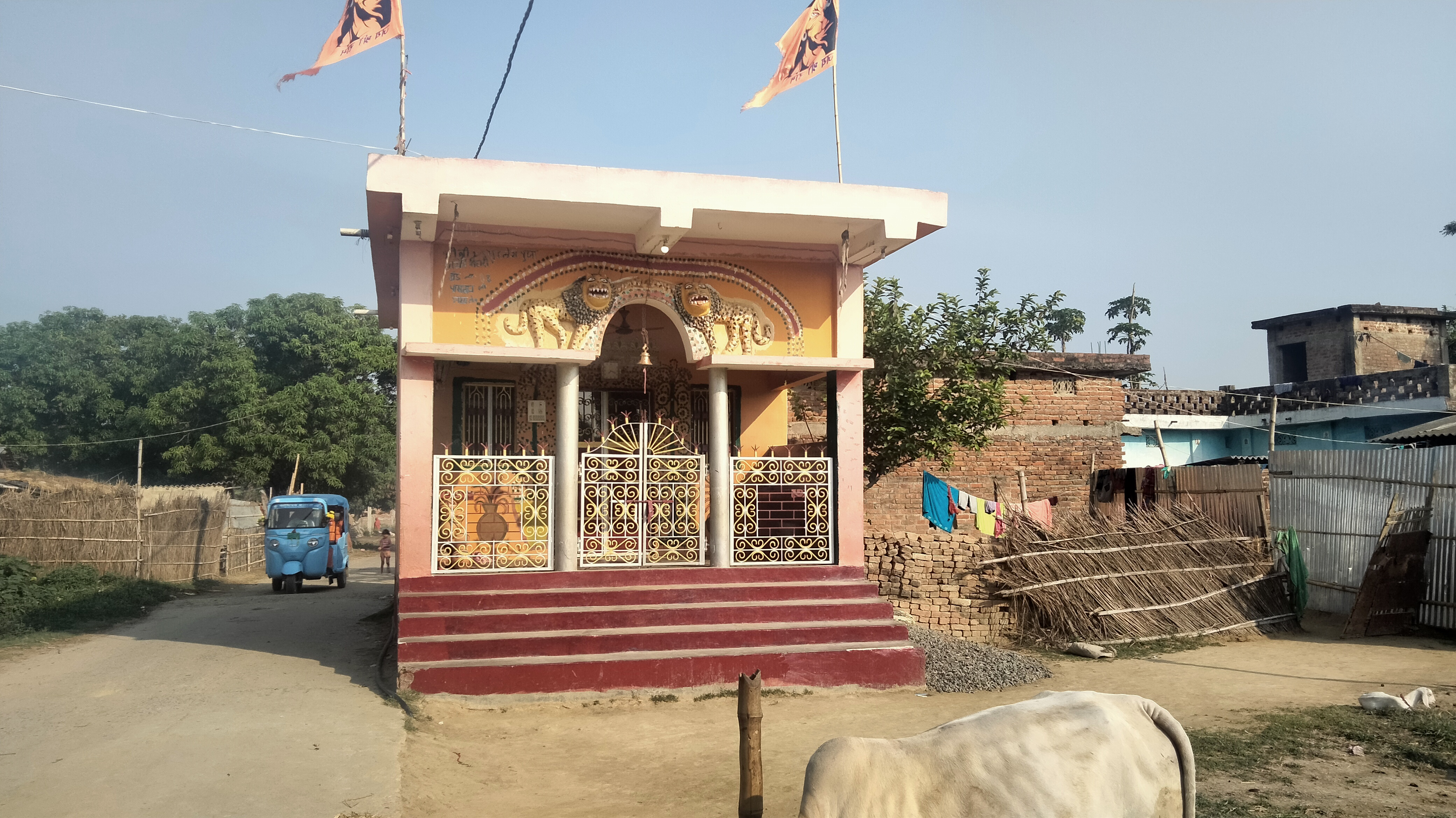
- View of Salhesh Mandir at Inarwa Tol in the village of Basuki Bihari in India.

Religion
- Affiliation: Hinduism
- Deity: Sahlesh
- Festival: Salhesh Mahotsav

Location
- Location: Mithila region of Indian subcontinent
- Country: India

Architecture
- Type: Simple pacca room
- Founder: Dushadh families
- A Hindu temple dedicated to Raja Salhesh of Mithila.

Raja Salhesh Mandir (Maithili: राजा सल्हेश मंदिर) or simply Salhesh Mandir refers to any Hindu temple dedicated to King Sahlesh in the Mithila region of the Indian subcontinent. Sahlesh is worshipped as a deity among the region's Dusadh community.

== Description ==
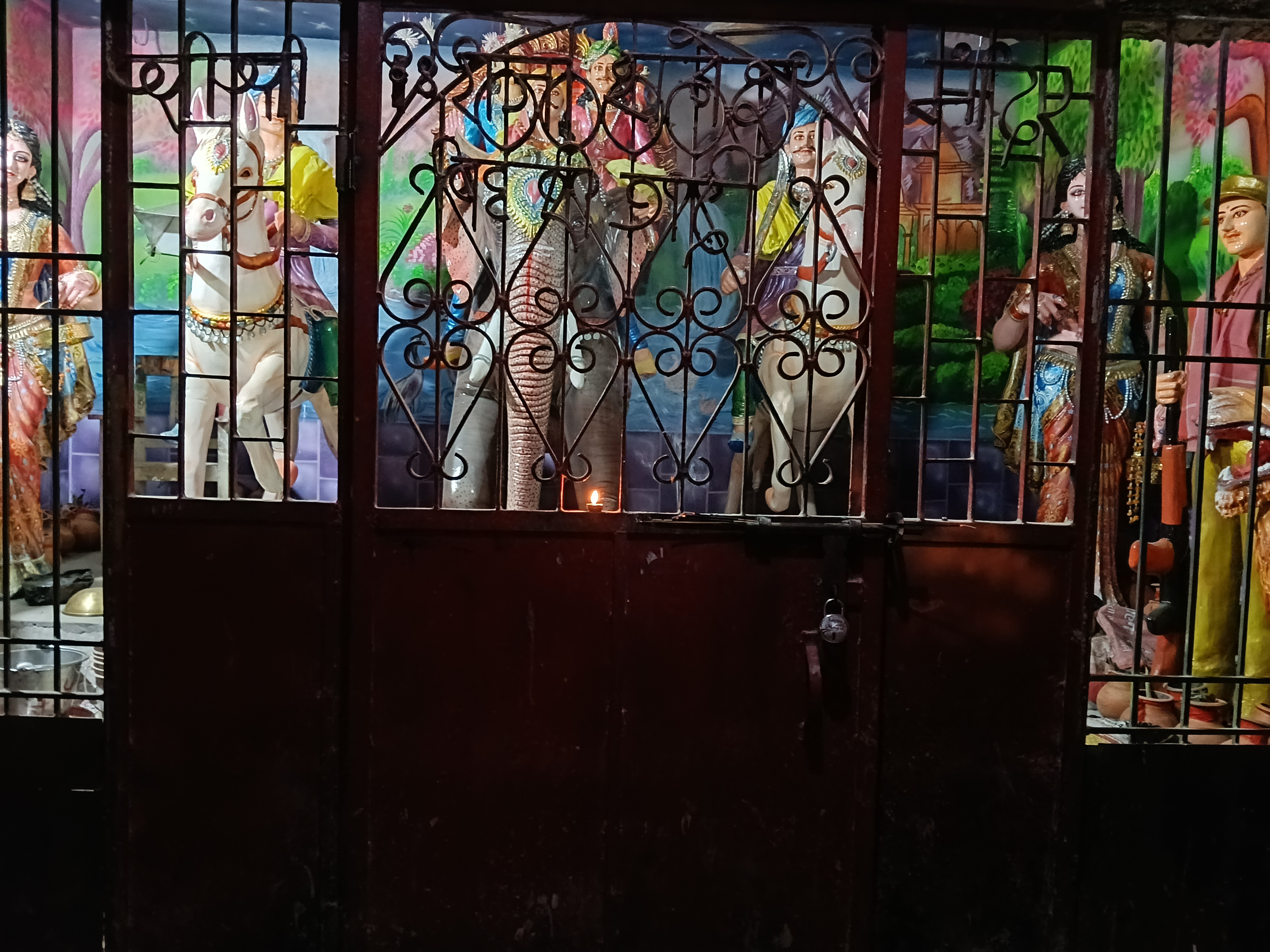
View of Salhesh Gahabar at Raja Salhesh Mandir in the premises of the Maharani Sthan at the Chaudhary Tol in Basuki Bihari North.

Raja Salhesh is the Kuladevata of the Dusadh community in the Mithila region. According to the legend of the community, he dedicated his entire life for the upliftment and unity of the society. The inner part of the temple is known as gahabar, where the statues of Raja Salhesh along with his companions are established. The community has its own practices and rituals for conducting worship and prayer to the Kuladevata Raja Salhesh at the temple.

=== Bhagat (priest) ===
The rituals practiced in the temple is guided by their own community priest called as bhagat. He chants folklore mantras dedicated to Raja Salhesh during the rituals. The bhagat of the community, shows and performs the Kartavyas (duties) of Raja Salhesh, Motiram, and Baba Chauharmal, etc during the festival dedicated to Raja Salhesh.

== Festivals ==
The Dusadh community in the region organises an annual festival dedicated to Raja Salhesh in the temple. The annual festival is known as Salhesh Mahotsav. During the commencement of the festival, a grand Shobha Yatra having a large number of devotees in the procession is circumambulated in the village. In the procession, the devotees carry religious flags, traditional dhol-pipahi and raise slogans in praise of the King Salhesh. During the Shobha Yatra, attractive tableaux of several gods and goddesses that includes Raja Salhesh, Kusuma, Shankar-Parvati, Malin, Moti Ram, Budheshwar, Chuharmal, Vanshakti Mai, Raja Veerbhadra are shown to adherents devotees. Similarly, the women or girls of the community hold Kalash Yatra and bring water in the Kalash from a sacred water resource such as Kamala river.

The festival is generally held in the month of Sawan, but in some villages it is also organised in some other months. The festival is celebrated with a great pomp by the people of the community in the Mithila region.
