= 1959 Mahasu by-election =

On June 3, 1959, a by-election was held for one of the Mahasu seats in the Lok Sabha (the lower house of the Parliament of India). In the 1957 Indian general election Yashwant Singh Parmar and Nek Ram of the Indian National Congress had been declared the winners of the two Mahasu constituency seats, but subsequently the Election Tribunal had declared the election of Parmer invalid due to 'corrupt practices'.

There were three candidates in the fray for the by-election; Shivanand Ramaul from the Indian National Congress, Hira Singh Pal from the Praja Socialist Party and Kameshwar Pandit from the Communist Party of India (standing as an independent). Ramaul won the seat with 39,405 votes (50.39%). Pal obtained 31,250 votes (40.39%) and Pandit got 6,712 votes (8.67%).
