= Kameshwar Pandit =

Kameshwar Pandit was an Indian politician, trade unionist and journalist. Pandit founded the Himachal Pradesh branch of the Communist Party of India in 1953.

Pandit contested in the June 3, 1959 Mahasu Lok Sabha seat by-election, standing as an independent politician. Pandit won 6,712 (8.67%) of the votes.

Pandit remained in the CPI after the 1964 split in the party and stayed on as the Himachal Pradesh State Council Secretary of CPI until his death. He was the leader of mass organizations like the All India Trade Union Congress and the All India Kisan Sabha. Pandit served as the editor of the weekly Himachal Janata for many years. He also founded the weekly Himachal Darpan and Pahari. He wrote several books and worked on a number of periodical publications. He was a member of the CPI National Council.

He was offered the position as state governor of "Uttar Pardesh"by Prime Minister H.D. Deve Gowda but turned down the offer.

Pandit died in Shimla on 29 June 2001.
