= Kameshwar Yadav =

Indian Hindutva activist

Kameshwar Yadav (died 3 January 2024), also known as Kameswar Pehlwan, was an Indian politician and Hindutva activist who was convicted for the 1989 Bhagalpur riots. He was associated with the Rashtriya Swayamsevak Sangh and Hindu Mahasabha who fought 1990 Bihar Legislative Assembly election on the symbol of Hindu Mahasabha from Nathnagar Assembly constituency but lost by a margin of around 9000 votes to Sudha Shrivastav. He was convicted in November 2007 and acquitted in July 2017 due to lack of evidence. He had served as the Head of Parbati Locality and as a member of the Yadav Vikas Manch.

== Early life ==
He was born at Parvatti Muhalla.

== Death and legacy ==
He died on 3 January 2024, following age related illness. Bhagalpur BJP district president Santosh Kumar, and Ashwini Kumar Choubey, a Central minister and Member of Lok Sabha has condoled his death.
