= Kameshwar Prasad =

Indian neurologist and academic

- Born: Jharkhand, India
- Occupations: Neurologist; Medical academic
- Known for: Evidence-based medicine
- Awards: Padma Shri

Kameshwar Prasad is an Indian neurologist, medical researcher, academic. He is an emeritus professor at the All India Institute of Medical Sciences, Delhi (AIIMS), known as a proponent of evidence-based medicine (EBM) and evidence-based healthcare (EBHC). The government of India awarded him the fourth highest civilian honour of the Padma Shri in 1991.

== Biography ==
Prasad graduated in medicine from Rajendra Institute of Medical Sciences, with the award for Best Medical Graduate of the Year award and secured his MD and DM from the AIIMS in Delhi in 1983 and 1985 respectively. After starting his career by joining AIIMS, he also secured a master's degree (MSc) in Clinical Epidemiology and Health Research Methodology from McMaster University, Canada in 1993, pursuing the course as an Indian Clinical Epidemiology Network (INCLEN) Fellow. At AIIMS, he established the Stroke Clinic in 1995 and has been involved with stroke management in India at various levels including as the chairman of the Scientific Advisory Board of the Panel Area for Stroke Registry, constituted by the Indian Council of Medical Research and as the convenor of the National Stroke Management Guidelines.

Prasad headed the AIIMS research team which conducted a study on the neurological disease management practices in the hospitals in India in 2012 for evolving guidelines for the standardization of drug use in India. He is the principal investigator of the joint study conducted by the All India Institute of Medical Sciences and Erasmus University Rotterdam for tracking the risk factors of stroke and cognitive decline in people over 50. The study, known to be the first of its kind in India, is expected to cover 15,000 healthy people and extend up to five years. He has also done many clinical trials on stem cell therapy and is a member of the Neuro-Core Committee of the Indian Council of Medical Research. When the Ministry of Health, Bahrain, established the Department of Clinical Neurosciences, he served as its founder chairman.

Prasad, who has known interests in stroke management and evidence-based medicine, is a member of the board of the EBHC International Conference. He was a member of the Panel of Facilitators for the 13th Asia Pacific Evidence-Based Medicine & Nursing Workshop and Conference, held at Singapore in January 2015. He is a member of the Clinical Epidemiology Unit Network of the Indian Clinical Epidemiology Network (INCLEN) He was the editor of Cochrane Acute Respiratory Infections Group for two terms, the editorial board member of Practical Neurology, and has been a referee for several international journals. Oxford University invited him as a visiting lecturer on three occasions and he worked as a visiting lecturer at McMaster University in Canada and Arabian Gulf University on ten occasions each and at the National University of Singapore seven times. His researches and observations are recorded by way of several articles published in peer reviewed journals and he is the author of Fundamentals of Evidence-Based Medicine, a handbook on evidence-based medicine. The government of India included him in the 1992 Republic Day honours list for the civilian award of the Padma Shri and the National Academy of Medical Sciences elected him as their fellow in 2011.

== Published work ==
- Prasad, Kameshwar (2013). Fundamentals of Evidence-Based Medicine. India: Springer. p. 154. ISBN 978-8132208303.
