= Salahesh =

Folk deity

Raja Salhesh
- Dusadh community
- Member of Folklore in Mithila
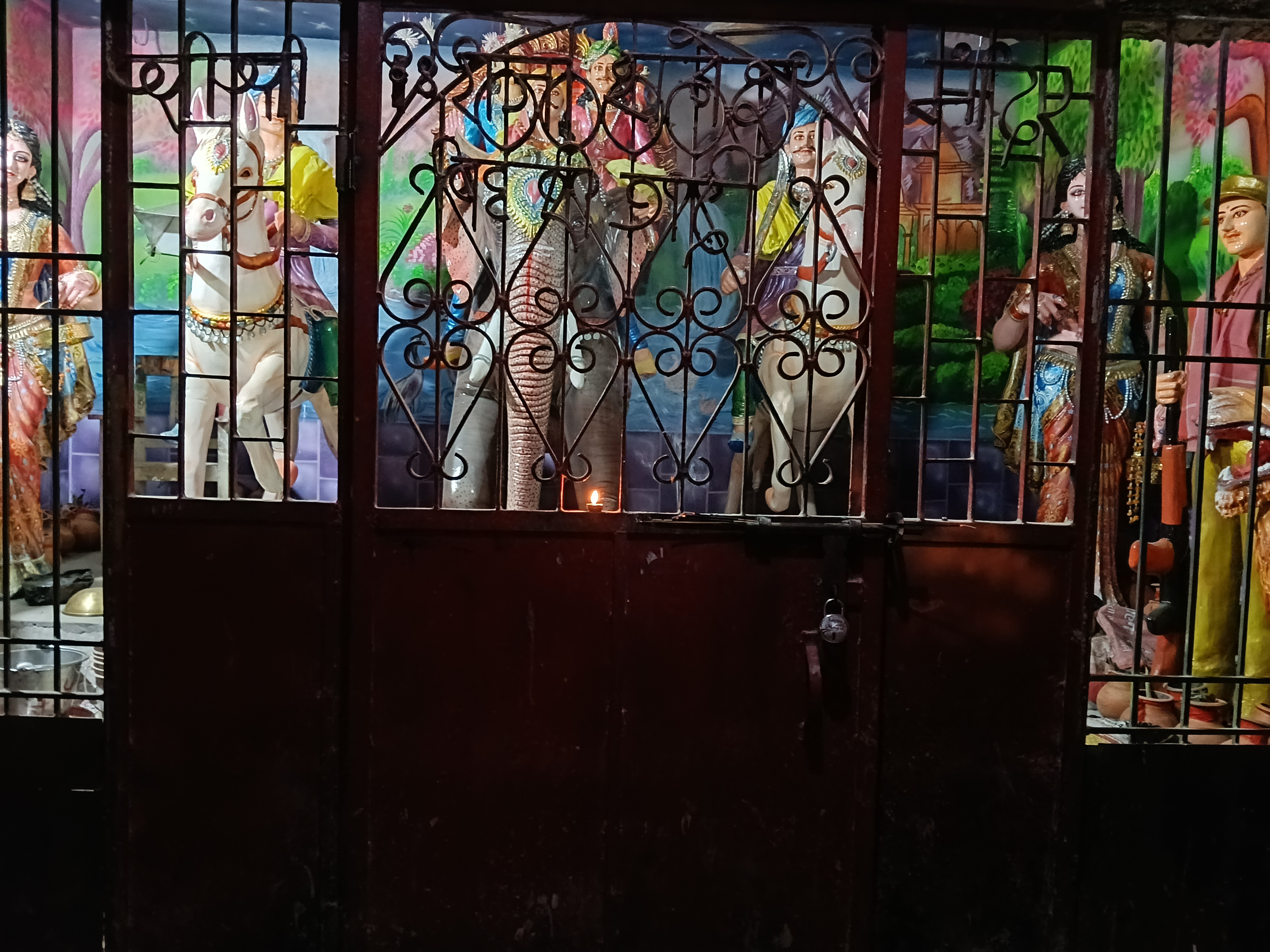
- View of a statue of Raja Salhesh at a temple dedicated to him in the premises of the Maharani Sthan at Basuki Bihari North
- Affiliation: Hinduism
- Region: Mithila region
- Ethnic group: Dusadh community
- Temples: Raja Salhesh Mandir
- Festivals: Raja Salhesh Mahotsav

Genealogy
- Born: Salhesh

Sahlesh was a folk hero of the Dusadh caste in Nepal and India. He is believed to have been the ruler of the Mahisautha in what became Nepal. In some parts of North India. Sahlesh is respected by communities apart from the Dusadhs. In local culture, he is portrayed as a symbol of prowess, valour and benevolence. Dauna Malin is believed to be a beloved of Sahlesh, while his four assistants namely Chauharmal, Moti Ram and Karikant are also worshipped. Chauharmal is worshipped by Dusadhs of Bihar and is considered to be the military commander of King Sahlesh. Moti Ram and Karikant are considered as his brother and nephew, respectively. Biratnagar, which is considered to be the land of Sahlesh, houses one of the finest temple of King Sahlesh. Sahlesh is also known as Rajaji. They worship mainly Salhesh Maharaj or Rajaji and his associates. In the region of Mithila, several Salhesh temples are built at different places dedicated to the King Salhesh and his associates. Within the Danuwar community, Salhesh is regarded as the royal wrestler of Danuwar King Kuleshwar Singh kingdom of Pakariya gadh, located in present day Siraha district of Nepal.

== Folklore ==
Sahlesh saves Dalits from the feudal lords their women from the atrocities of the kings and their men. Dalit brides were frequently kidnapped and raped by the feudal lords and the kings, and Sahlesh is known for confronting and challenging these practices. The root word "Sahlesh" also stands for "King of the mountains", and it is believed that his empire extended to parts of Bihar.

Sahlesh was born in Mehsautha village in the Mithilanchal region into the Dusadh caste. This caste is known for valour and for theft and robbery. Sahlesh was a critic of these crimes as well as the feudal structure of society. Sahlesh had an egalitarian ideology who wanted to remove the ills of society like untouchability in favor of a society based on equality.

Salesh created a large army with the help of forest dwellers. Mithilanchal during those times was a war-torn region facing invasions by Chinese and Mongols. His army of forest dwellers defeated them all. F. E. Pargiter says that the devastation of the Chinese Shan army was such that not a single man was left to take the message of their defeat back to China.

Anang Kusuma, also known as Dauna Malin, is a nun of the Mahayana sect of Buddhism and the beloved of king Sahlesh.

== Rule of Sahlesh ==
It is believed that Sahlesh focused on local governance and created local bodies, where he listened to people's problems. He is said to have punished a Tantric named Chakranath for following inhumane practices such as Nagdasi. Every year two young girls were forced to breastfeed a venomous snake, which killed them. The people were fearful. Sahlesh ended this practice by defeating Chakranath with Anang Kusuma's help.

== Commemoration ==
The Dusadh community over Uttar Pradesh and Bihar commemorate their folk heroes, including Sahlesh and Reshama-Chauharmal via festivals and singing. They installed statues and formed socio-political organizations.

In Darbhanga district of Bihar, potters make the figures of Sahlesh and his companions that are worshipped by the Dusadhs of the region.
