= Bataidari system =

Bataidari system is a sharecropping, an agricultural practice where a landowner lends his land to another who spends money and labour, and in which the produce is shared by the owner and the tenant. it is prevalent in the state of Bihar in India where nearly 35% of cultivable land is under this system.

== History ==
The system was prevalent during British Raj in many parts of India, including fertile plains of Punjab, in other places the jotedar system was prevalent. Since most of the tenants were poor labourers they had to borrow money from moneylenders for cultivation, which perpetuated the cycle of poverty. Though land reforms were implemented across Bihar after independence through the Bataidari Act, but deemed exploitative against labourer and lead to violence, especially caste violence between labour communities and landowners. In the past, landforms have been demanded and even made a political plank in state assembly elections, especially by Left parties.

== See also ==
- Feudalism in India
