= Chauharmal =

Folk deity

Veer Chauharmal
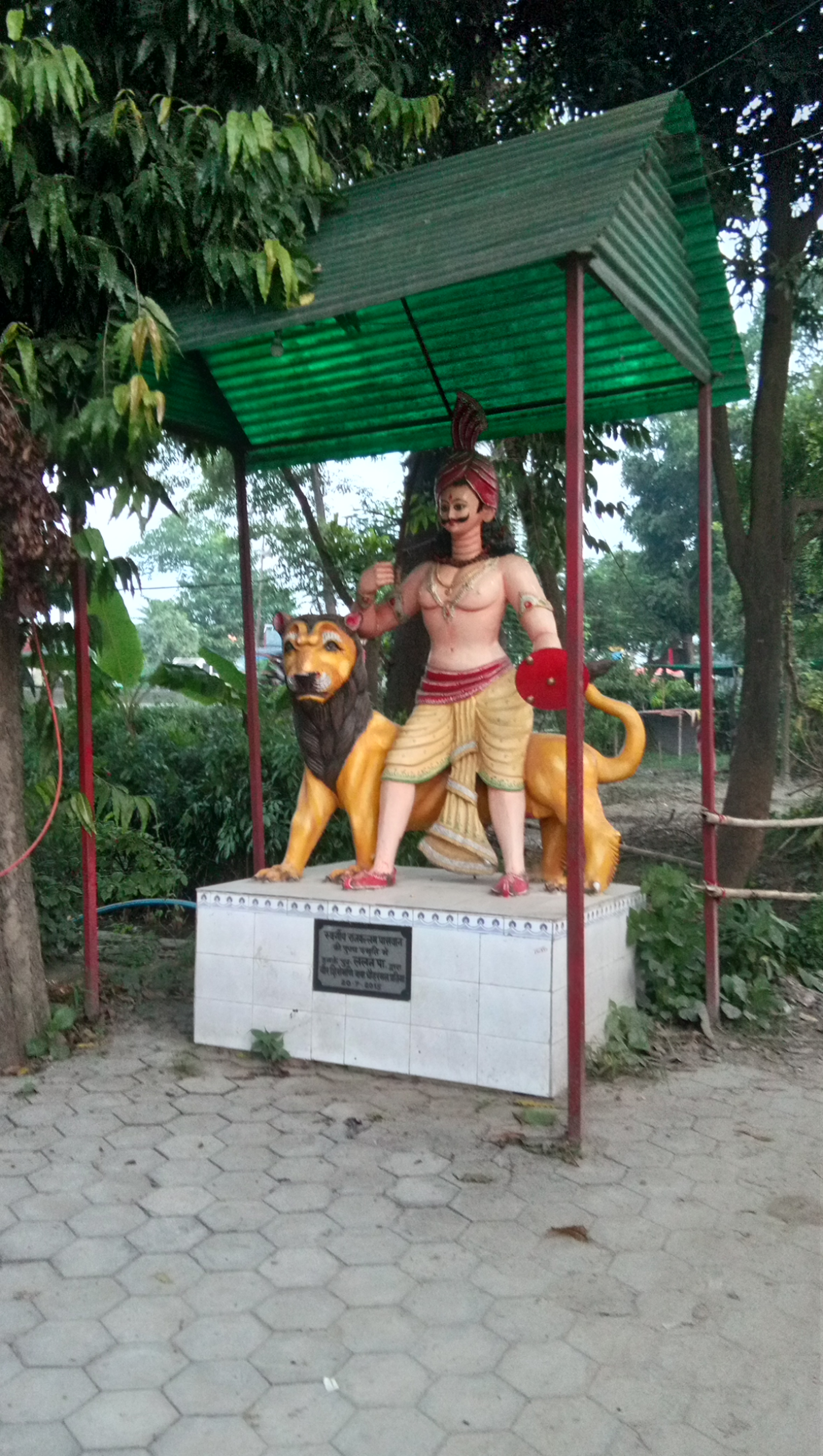
- Devnagari.: चौहरमल
- Affiliation: Non-Brahmanical deity.
- Weapon: Sword
- Mount: Horse & Lion

"Chauharmal" or "Chuharmal" or "Veer Chauharmal" was a folk hero who was later apotheosized by members of the Dusadh caste in India. The story of Chauharmal in Dusadh folklore is an empowering message which gives the Dalit community a sense of valor, resistance and social assertion, leading to him becoming an anti-caste symbol.

== In popular culture ==
Chauharmal was born in Anjani village, which is located in Patna district. He is described as a devotee of Goddess Durga.

In the folklores of Bihar, various stories of Chauharmal exist. Some of these stories consider him a folk hero of Dusadh community, while other degrade him as an anti-hero. According to the most popular variant, he was a chivalrous man of Dusadh caste who used to study along with his Rajput friend, Ajab Singh. The father of Ajab Singh was a powerful landlord named Ranjit Singh and his sister was Reshma, who was in love with the Chauharmal who considered her as his sister. Annoyed by the attitude of Chauharmal, Reshma sends an army of his father to defeat Chauharmal and demoralise him. But Dusadhs performed Rahu Puja and Chauharmal escaped due to the grace of Isht devi (folk goddess) of the Dusadh caste while Reshma was burnt into ashes. Though the story is not historically verified, the folklore had become popular among the Dalits, particularly among the Dusadhs.

The Dusadhs of Mithila region however recognise Sahlesh as their hero, who is said to be uncle of Chauharmal. Sahlesh was able to take a job as a palace guard ("Mahapour") in the fort of "King of Morang".Chauharmal himself wanted that job and felt cheated. He decided to take revenge but was killed by Sahles. Thus, according to this tradition Sahles is the primary hero while Chauharmal is given secondary status.

The Dalit community also praises Chauharmal and Sahles through various folk songs usually sung in the Bhojpuri language . One of the notable folk songs sung in the praise of Chauharmal after Reshma's introduction in his life goes as follows:

Original

Rama Ho Ram Man
Hi Man Soche Chuharmal Ho Ram
Kahan Se Alei Vipatiya Ho Ram Rama ho Ram!
Aho Rama Devi Ke Sumirai Surama Chuharmal Ho Ram

Translation

" From where has this calamity (the girl) has come
so is now thinking Chauharmal
Disturbed as he is
Now prays to goddess".

== Commemoration ==
The Dusadh celebrate numerous festivals associated with the Chauharmal; the biggest among these being famous "Chauharmal Mela", celebrated near Patna. According to Vijay Nambisan, the Dusadhs of the region participate with pomp and show in the famous mela to commemorate the popular saint (Chauharmal) who not only fled with an "upper caste" girl but also vanquished all her kin. The centre of attraction in this festival remains the participation of Lalu Prasad Yadav. Earlier, such an incident received violent reaction from the Rajputs, but Yadav's participation makes it a rallying point for Dalits.

The celebrations had witnessed violent clashes between the upper and the lower castes in past, the most infamous being the "Ekauni incident". The Dalits however organise theatrical performances like "Rani Reshma ka khela" to commemorate the whole life of Chauharmal in which various stages of his life are performed by the trained artists. The ritual head of Dusadhs, the Bhagat performs rituals during such occasions.
