= Paswan =

Dalit community in Eastern India

- Religions: Hinduism
- Languages: Hindi • Bhojpuri • Angika
- Country: India
- Populated states: Bihar; Jharkhand; Uttar Pradesh
- Region: Eastern India
- Population: 6,943,000 (5.3111% of the population of Bihar)

The Paswan, also known as Dusadh, are a Dalit community from eastern India. They are found mainly in the states of Bihar, Uttar Pradesh and Jharkhand. The Urdu word Paswan means bodyguard or "one who defends". The origin of the word, per the belief of the community, lies in their participation in the battle against Siraj-ud-daulah, the Nawab of Bengal at the behest of British East India Company, after which they were rewarded with the post of Chowkidars and lathi-(baton) wielding tax collector for the Zamindars. They follow certain rituals such as walking on fire to assert their valour.

== Etymology ==
The Paswans claim their origin from a number of folk and epic characters in order to seek upliftment in their social status. Some Paswan believe that they have originated from Rahu, a superhuman and one of the planets in Hindu mythology, while others claim their origin from Dushasana, one of the Kaurava princes. Claims regarding origin from "Gahlot Kshatriya" are also persistent among some members of the community, but others view such claims with disdain, as they do not like to be associated with Rajputs.

It has also been argued by some Bhumihars, that the Paswan are hybrid scions of cross marriages between two different castes. The Paswan community rejects these theories, and argues the origin of the name 'Dusadh' lies in Dusadhya, meaning "who is difficult to be defeated".

== History ==
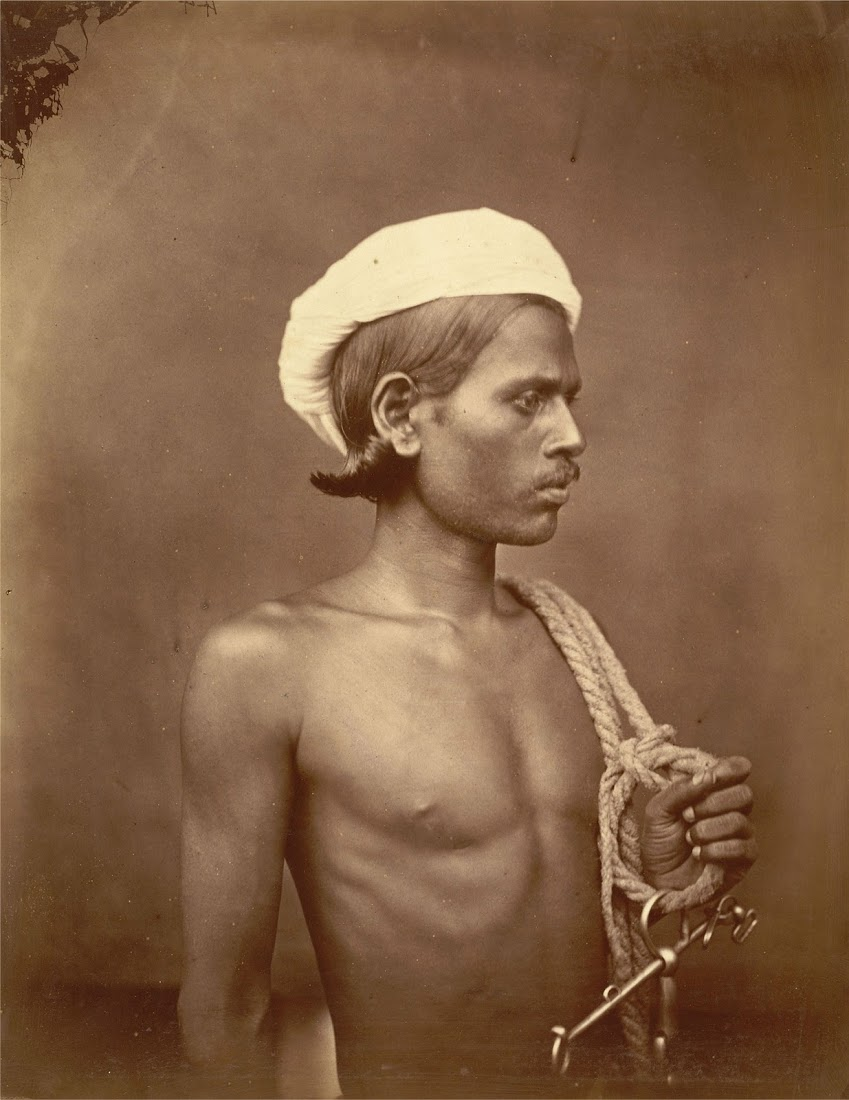
Portrait of a Dusadh man in Bengal from 1860 CE

They have been considered to be an untouchable community. In Bihar, they are primarily landless, agricultural labourers and have historically been village watchmen and messengers. They are one of the most discriminated caste group in the feudal society of rural Bihar. Reports indicates that the Dusadh landless women were often subjected to undignified teasings like "pinching on breast" by their landlords who were primarily Rajputs. The landlords also raped these women frequently in order to keep their men in submissive position.

Prior to 1900, they also used to rear pigs particularly in Uttar Pradesh and Bihar. The Paswans defend the occupation of rearing of pigs by stating it as a strategy to counter the Muslims. They assert that, in order to protect themselves from Muslims, Paswan girls used to wear amulets made from bones of pigs and kept pigs at their doors, given the animosity of Muslims with pigs. Since Rajputs of Rajasthan also reared as well as hunted wild pigs, this fact is used by them to defend this occupation which is corroborated by the fact that after the end of Zamindari system, the traditional occupation of serving as guards couldn't provide subsistence to them.

The Paswans have also been historically associated with martial pursuits and many fought on behalf of the East India Company during the 18th century in the Bengal Army. The 2011 Census of India for Uttar Pradesh showed the Paswan population, which is classified as a Scheduled Caste, as being 230,593. The same census showed a population of 4,945,165 in Bihar.

The folk hero of the Paswans is Chauharmal. Within Paswan folklore, the tale of Chauharmal and Reshma is well known. Reshma, the daughter of a powerful Bhumihar landlord, persuades Chauharmal to marry her against her father's wishes. Eventually Chauharmal confronts his beloved's father and defeats him, symbolizing the victory of the community over their Bhumihar oppressors. Other versions of the tale reject this empowering message by claiming Chauharmal was born in a Brahmin family in previous birth while Reshma was born as his wife.

Apart from Chauharmal Baba, some Dusadh also worship Gauriya Baba.This folk hero as per their oral traditions is contemporary of Mughal rule in India. According to the folklores he used to ride a horse and protected not only his own castemen but also the other Hindus including the Rajputs from the onslaught of Mughal soldiers and forcible conversions to Islam. Baba used to bury the head of pig in front of his house which was located at the fringe of village. Since pigs were anathema for Muslims, it protected the village from the incursions of Mughal soldiers who were predominantly Muslim.

== Politics ==
In 1900, caste association became the dominant method to pitch for the social and political rights. Hence, a number of caste association of politically aware castes were formed in the meantime. Like Koeri, Kurmi and Yadav community, Paswans also formed their own Paswan Sabha in 1911 to make claims to Kshatriya status. They were first among Dalits to achieve this feat.

The Paswans emerged as a political force in Bihar, primarily after the resurgence of socialist leader Ram Vilas Paswan. Paswan floated the Lok Janshakti Party, which became an ally of Lalu Prasad Yadav-led Rashtriya Janata Dal. Earlier, the Dalits including the Paswan community voted for Congress but during RJD-LJP alliance they became a supporter of a bloc which included their earlier preference Congress as well as the new choice LJP. It is difficult to predict the actual data regarding the population of various caste groups but according to political analysts, this new bloc of RJD-Congress aided by LJP commanded huge support from Yadav, Muslim as well as Paswan community. This social axis remained successful to offset the JDU-BJP alliance in 2004 Lok Sabha elections of Bihar.

Earlier, the attempts to woo Paswans in his favour was also made by RJD chief Laloo Yadav (then Chief Minister of Bihar), who portrayed Chauharmal as an iconic figure and attempted to reconcile them with his politics of social justice. He also organised a Chauharmal Mela in 1995. Ram Vilas Paswan was too in this fray, who aimed both to champion himself as the real face of this community as well as to gather the support for his newly formed organisation, Dalit Sena.

== Inter-caste conflicts ==
=== Belchi massacre ===
In 1970s, the Belchi village in Bihar witnessed one of the severest massacres of Bihar's history. The root cause of the massacre was caste conflict between Paswan landless peasants and Kurmi landlords. This massacre parted the way between Kurmis and Paswans and made them skeptical of each other's activities in all spheres of life.

=== Bhojpur rebellion ===
Bhojpur Rebellion is the term used to describe the internecine conflict between upper caste landlords & landless Dalits led by poor peasants from middle peasant castes during the 1960s. The cause of caste wars in Bhojpur was not only the economical issues but also the unrestricted access of upper castes to Dalit women . Here, the spark of rebellion emerged from Ekwaari village, under the leadership of Koeri militant, Jagdish Mahto aided by his lieutenants Ramnaresh Ram (Ramnaresh Paswan) and Rameswar Ahir "Sadhuji." The trio organised murders of a number of upper-caste landlords under the banner of Maoism. After the encounter of its core commanders, the Maoist resurgence in Bhojpur faded away. It was believed that the forcing of lower caste women into adultery and the frequent rapes of these disadvantaged women by the Rajput landlords was one of the cause of the Bhojpur rebellion, which continued though at low scale, after the death of Jagdish Mahto. Those who took it forward include people like Fagu Mahto who were disgusted with the prevalent feudal dominance of the Rajput landlords.

=== Senari massacre ===
In the 1990s in Senari, Jahanabad district, a Maoist communist centre (MCC) unit composed primarily of Paswans and Yadavs assassinated 34 Bhumihars. A 'session Court' of Bihar awarded death penalty to ten perpetrators in 2016.

== Paswans in Nepal ==
The Central Bureau of Statistics of Nepal classifies the Paswan as a subgroup within the broader social group of Madheshi Dalits. At the time of the 2011 Nepal census, 208,910 people (0.8% of the population of Nepal) were Paswan. The frequency of Paswans by province was as follows:

- Madhesh Province (2.8%)
- Lumbini Province (1.0%)
- Koshi Province (0.2%)
- Bagmati Province (0.0%)
- Gandaki Province (0.0%)
- Sudurpashchim Province (0.0%)
- Karnali Province (0.0%)

The frequency of Paswans was higher than national average (0.8%) in the following districts:

- Kapilvastu (3.8%)
- Sarlahi (3.7%)
- Siraha (3.3%)
- Bara (3.1%)
- Rautahat (2.9%)
- Parsa (2.7%)
- Dhanusha (2.5%)
- Mahottari (2.4%)
- Saptari (1.7%)
- Parasi (1.6%)
- Rupandehi (1.5%)
- Banke (0.9%)

== See also ==
- Paswan (surname)
- Sahlesh
- Dalits in Bihar
- Raja Salhesh Mandir
