= Belchhi =

Belchhi बेल्छी Belchi
- Village
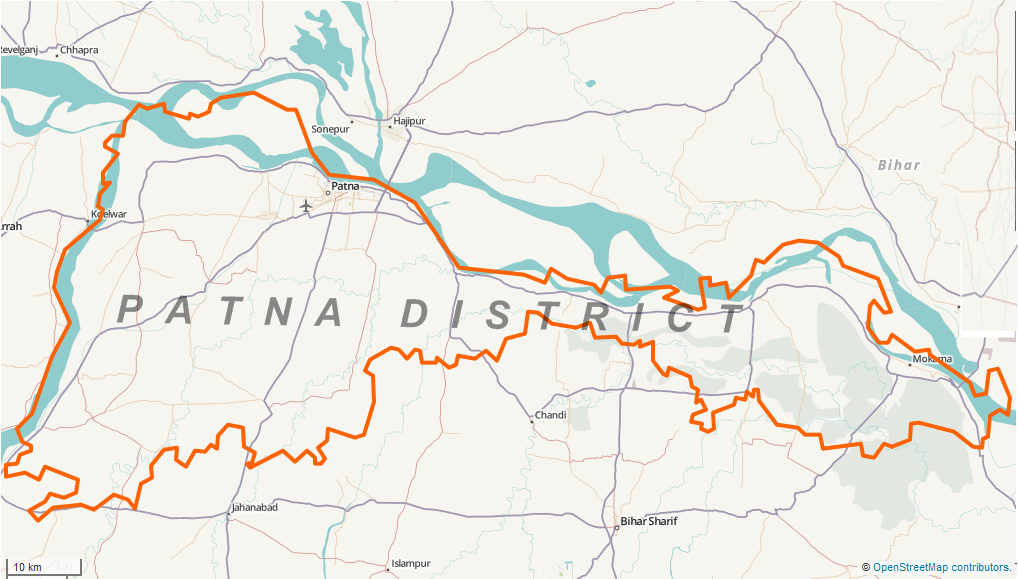
- Interactive map of Belchhi
- Coordinates: 25.36270°N 85.47994°E
- Country: India
- State: Bihar
- District: Patna

Government
  - Type: state

Population
  - Total: 6,731

Languages
  - Spoken: Magadhi, Hindi
- Time zone: UTC+5:30 (IST)
- Pincode: 803110
- ISO 3166 code: IN-BR

Belchhi (hi:बेल्छी), also written as Belchi is a historically important village in Bihar state, India. It is situated 90 km from Patna and is a Block in Barh subdivision (Tehsil) of Patna District. It lies on National Highway 431, which runs from Fatuha (Fatuwah) to Barh.

== Demographics ==
As per 2011 Census of India, Belchhi had a population of 3821, with 1956 males and 1865 females in a total of 673 families. Schedule Caste (SC) constituted 42.95 % of its total population.The literacy rate of Belchhi village was 47.15 %.

== 1977 Belchhi massacre ==
The incident occurred on May 27, 1977 at around 11 am, the village was surrounded by 60-70 men and a gang of the land-owning Kurmi caste led by Mahavir Mahato, shot 11 men, including eight dalits (lower caste) and three members of the backward caste, Sunar. Subsequently, they were burnt alive in a common pyre with their hands tied. Subsequently, based on the key testimony of survivor Janaki Paswan, 2 of the accused received death sentences and 11 others were given life sentences. The death penalty was given by the Patna High Court in 1982 and upheld by the Supreme Court bench headed by Justice Syed Murtaza Fazl Ali in 1983. This made it an important event in the legal history of India, where the death penalty was given to perpetrators in Caste-related violence.

=== Indira Gandhi visit ===
In 1977, Indira Gandhi was out of power. It was then, on 13 August 1977, that she visited Belchhi to meet with surviving victims of atrocities perpetrated there against untouchables. She went to Belchhi by riding an elephant because it was impassable due to the monsoon season, and thus she inspired a new public image. This event triggered a reversal of fortunes for her and for the Congress Party, and became a turning point in modern Indian politics. It also put Belchhi front and centre in the national news. This also meant the case received public attention and the Chief Minister of the time, Jaganath Mishra, himself got involved, and the victims got justice, which is rare in such cases. And that time, the Bihar government passed a new policy to build a police station, a block office and a post office.

== Sufi Chillah ==
The part of Belchi where the famous Sufi chillah is situated is located in Nalanda district (Bihar Sharif). Nalanda adjoins Patna district, having split off from Patna in 1972.

The 12th century Sufi saint Usman Harooni's chillah (a shrine, but not a burial shrine) is in Belchi. According to legend, Usman had a muridah (a female Sufi student) who resided in Belchi and had promised her that after her death her tomb would be positioned beneath Usman Harooni's legs. Eventually, Usman Harooni died in Makkah, Arabia, and his body was buried there. To fulfill his promise, he came to Belchi in spirit and ordered his chillah to be built, and beside it the tomb of the muridah. Thus, Usman's chillah in Belchi is regarded as a tangible emblem of his spiritual strength.

Since the discovery of the chillah site by a traveling Chishti shaikh in the 15th century A.D., a celebration of Usman Harooni's urs (anniversary of his transitioning out of the world) has been a popular annual event at the Chillah Belchi, from the 14th to the 16th of Shawwal (Islamic calendar).
