= Second Modi ministry =

Government of India (2019–2024)

- 25th Ministry of the Republic of India

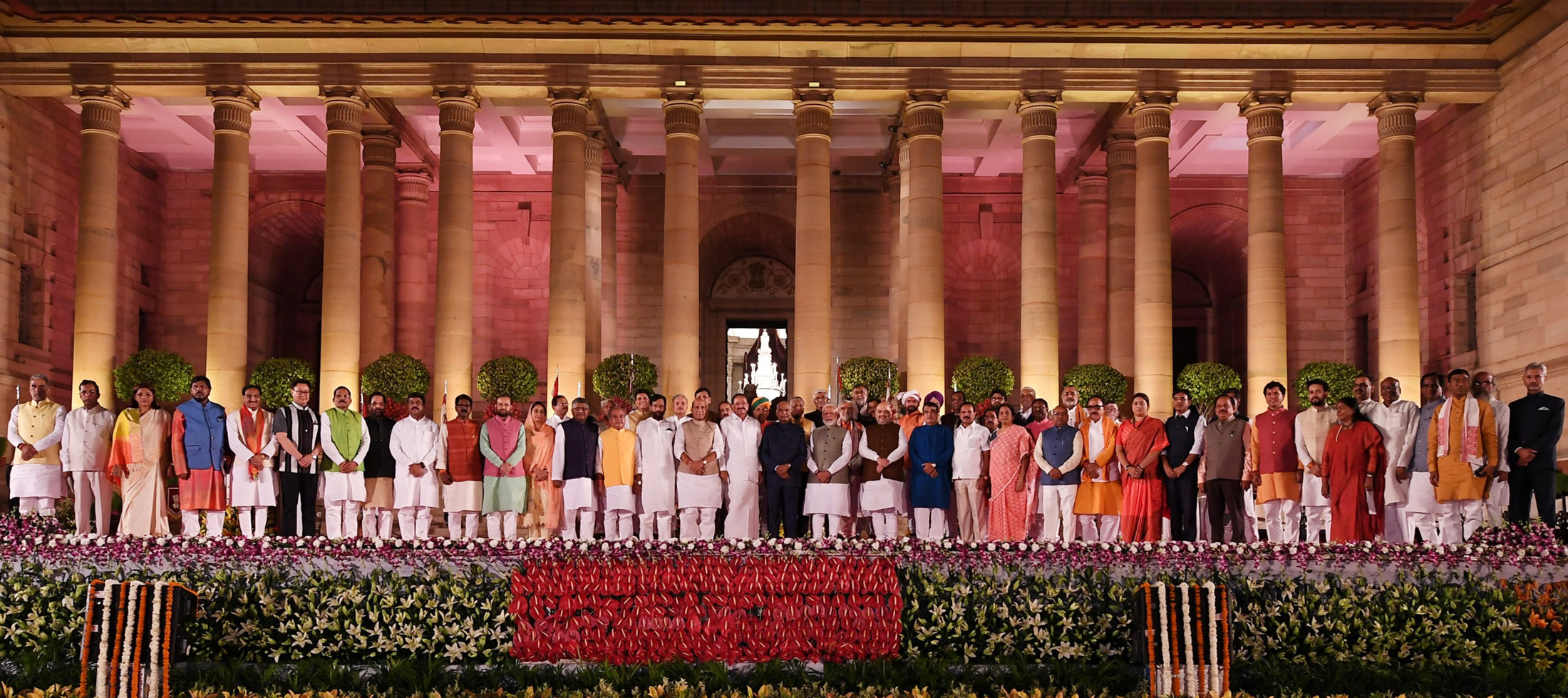
- Date formed: 30 May 2019
- Date dissolved: 9 June 2024

People and organisations
- President: Ram Nath Kovind (until 25 July 2022); Droupadi Murmu (from 25 July 2022)
- Prime Minister: Narendra Modi
- No. of ministers: 27 cabinet ministers 3 ministers of state (Independent Charge); 42 ministers of state
- Ministers removed: 22
- Total no. of members: 94
- Member parties: National Democratic Alliance: Bharatiya Janata Party; Republican Party of India (Athawale); Apna Dal (Sonelal); Former: Shiv Sena (2019); Shiromani Akali Dal (2019–2020); Lok Janshakti Party (2019–2020); Janata Dal (United) (2021–2022); Rashtriya Lok Janshakti Party (2021–2024)
- Status in legislature: Majority
- Opposition party: None (Note: In the 2019 general election, no opposition party obtained the minimum (54) amount of seats to become the official opposition, and thus there was no opposition leader. Adhir Ranjan Chowdhury is the leader of the Indian National Congress party in the Parliament, which has the largest number (50) of seats in the opposition.)
- Opposition leader: None (Note: In the 2019 Indian general election, no opposition party secured at least 10% of the total seats (55 out of 545) in the Lok Sabha to be eligible for the post of official Leader of the Opposition. As a result, the position has remained vacant. Adhir Ranjan Chowdhury served as the leader of the Indian National Congress in the Lok Sabha, which was the largest opposition party with 52 seats.) (Lok Sabha)

History
- Incoming formation: 17th Lok Sabha
- Outgoing formation: 18th Lok Sabha
- Election: 2019
- Outgoing election: 2024
- Legislature terms: 5 years, 10 days
- Budgets: 2019 Budget; 2020 Budget; 2021 Budget; 2022 Budget; 2023 Budget; 2024 Budget (Interim)
- Predecessor: First Modi ministry
- Successor: Third Modi ministry

The Second Modi ministry was the Council of Ministers headed by Prime Minister of India Narendra Modi that was formed after the 2019 general election which was held in seven phases from 11 April to 19 May 2019. The results of the election were announced on 23 May 2019 and this led to the formation of the 17th Lok Sabha. The oath ceremony was arranged in the forecourt of Rashtrapati Bhavan at Raisina Hill. The heads of the states of BIMSTEC countries were invited as guests of honor for this ceremony. It became one of the most diverse ministries of India.

On 7 July 2021, the government went through a ministry expansion with several big names dropped and new faces sworn in. Many current ministers were also given promotion for their good work.

Following the victory of the National Democratic Alliance in the 2024 general election, Prime Minister Modi and the council of ministers tendered their resignation to the President of India on 5 June 2024. However, they remained in office on caretaker basis until a new cabinet assumed office. On 9 June 2024, the new Cabinet of Third Modi ministry was sworn in with Modi again as Prime Minister.

== History ==
The Second Modi ministry came into existence following the 2019 general election to the 17th Lok Sabha in which the Bharatiya Janata Party-led National Democratic Alliance emerged victorious winning 353 of the 543 seats of the Lok Sabha. On 31 May 2019, Narendra Modi was sworn-in as the Prime Minister for the second time by President Ram Nath Kovind along with his council of ministers. The council of ministers which was sworn-in into office on 31 May 2019 consisted of 24 ministers with cabinet rank, 9 ministers of state with independent charge, and 24 ministers of state.

On August 8, 2023, Gaurav Gogoi moved a no-confidence motion against the second Modi ministry in the Lok Sabha. The government defeated the motion.

== Reshuffle and changes ==
Since the formation of the ministry in May 2019, the council of ministers had undergone several major and minor changes under various circumstances.

- 12 November 2019: Heavy Industries and Public Enterprises Minister Arvind Sawant of Shiv Sena resigned from the cabinet after Shiv Sena's withdrawal from NDA. Prakash Javadekar was assigned the additional charge of his ministry.
- 18 September 2020: Food Processing Industries Minister Harsimrat Kaur Badal of Shiromani Akali Dal resigned from the cabinet after Akali Dal's withdrawal from NDA in protest against three controversial farm laws. Narendra Singh Tomar was assigned the additional charge of the ministry.
- 23 September 2020: Minister of State for Railways Suresh Angadi died due to COVID-19 complications.
- 8 October 2020: Consumer Affairs, Food and Public Distribution Minister Ram Vilas Paswan of Lok Janshakti Party died after short illness. Piyush Goyal was assigned the additional charge of his ministry.
- 7 July 2021: A major cabinet reshuffle took place prior to which 12 ministers submitted their resignation. 15 ministers with cabinet rank and 27 ministers of state were inducted. Of the 15 cabinet ministers inducted, 7 ministers of state were promoted to cabinet rank.
- 6 July 2022: Minority Affairs Minister Mukhtar Abbas Naqvi and Steel Minister Ramchandra Prasad Singh submitted their resignations prior to expiration of tenure as Rajya Sabha MPs. Smriti Irani was assigned the additional charge of Minority Affairs ministry while Jyotiraditya Scindia was assigned the charge of Steel ministry.
- 18 May 2023: Law and Justice Minister Kiren Rijiju was appointed as Minister of Earth Sciences. Arjun Ram Meghwal was appointed as the Minister of State (Independent Charge) for Law and Justice, while S. P. Singh Baghel was appointed as the Minister of State for Health and Family Welfare.
- 7 December 2023: Agriculture and Farmers' Welfare Minister Narendra Singh Tomar, Jal Shakti and Food Processing Industries Minister of State Prahlad Singh Patel, and Tribal Affairs Minister of State Renuka Singh Saruta resigned from the cabinet following their election to the state legislative assemblies; Tribal Affairs Minister Arjun Munda assigned additional charge of Agriculture and Farmers' Welfare ministry. Rajeev Chandrasekhar assigned additional charge as minister of state for Jal Shakti, Shobha Karandlaje as minister of state for Food Processing Industries, and Bharati Pawar as minister of state for Tribal Affairs.
- 19 March 2024: Food Processing Industries Minister Pashupati Kumar Paras of Rashtriya Lok Janshakti Party resigned from the cabinet following seat-sharing disagreement; Earth Sciences Minister Kiren Rijiju assigned additional charge of the ministry.

== List of ministers ==
=== Cabinet Ministers ===
Portfolio	Minister	Took office	Left office	Party	Remarks
Prime Minister; Minister of Personnel, Public Grievances and Pensions; Department of Atomic Energy; Department of Space; All important policy issues; and All other portfolios not allocated to any Minister.	Narendra Modi	30 May 2019	9 June 2024	BJP	
Minister of Defence	Rajnath Singh	31 May 2019	9 June 2024	BJP	
Minister of Home Affairs	Amit Shah	31 May 2019	9 June 2024	BJP	
Minister of Road Transport and Highways	Nitin Gadkari	31 May 2019	9 June 2024	BJP	
Minister of Micro, Small and Medium Enterprises	Nitin Gadkari	31 May 2019	7 July 2021	BJP	
Minister of Micro, Small and Medium Enterprises	Narayan Rane	7 July 2021	9 June 2024	BJP	
Minister of Chemicals and Fertilizers	D. V. Sadananda Gowda	31 May 2019	7 July 2021	BJP	
Minister of Chemicals and Fertilizers	Mansukh Mandaviya	7 July 2021	9 June 2024	BJP	
Minister of Finance; Minister of Corporate Affairs	Nirmala Sitharaman	31 May 2019	9 June 2024	BJP	
Minister of Consumer Affairs, Food and Public Distribution	Ram Vilas Paswan	31 May 2019	8 October 2020	LJP	Died on 8 October 2020.
Minister of Consumer Affairs, Food and Public Distribution	Piyush Goyal	9 October 2020	9 June 2024	BJP	Additional charge following demise of Ram Vilas Paswan.
Minister of Agriculture and Farmers' Welfare	Narendra Singh Tomar	31 May 2019	7 December 2023	BJP	Resigned.
Minister of Agriculture and Farmers' Welfare	Arjun Munda	7 December 2023	9 June 2024	BJP	Additional charge following resignation of Narendra Singh Tomar.
Minister of Rural Development; Minister of Panchayati Raj	Narendra Singh Tomar	31 May 2019	7 July 2021	BJP	
Minister of Rural Development; Minister of Panchayati Raj	Giriraj Singh	7 July 2021	9 June 2024	BJP	
Minister of Law and Justice	Ravi Shankar Prasad	31 May 2019	7 July 2021	BJP	
Minister of Law and Justice	Kiren Rijiju	7 July 2021	18 May 2023	BJP	
Minister of Law and Justice	Arjun Ram Meghwal	18 May 2023	9 June 2024	BJP	Minister of State (I/C) is responsible.
Minister of Communications; Minister of Electronics and Information Technology	Ravi Shankar Prasad	31 May 2019	7 July 2021	BJP	
Minister of Communications; Minister of Electronics and Information Technology	Ashwini Vaishnaw	7 July 2021	9 June 2024	BJP	
Minister of Food Processing Industries	Harsimrat Kaur Badal	31 May 2019	18 September 2020	SAD	Resigned.
Minister of Food Processing Industries	Narendra Singh Tomar	18 September 2020	7 July 2021	BJP	Additional charge following resignation of Harsimrat Kaur Badal.
Minister of Food Processing Industries	Pashupati Kumar Paras	7 July 2021	19 March 2024	RLJP	Resigned.
Minister of Food Processing Industries	Kiren Rijiju	20 March 2024	9 June 2024	BJP	Additional charge following resignation of Pashupati Kumar Paras.
Minister of Social Justice and Empowerment	Thawar Chand Gehlot	31 May 2019	7 July 2021	BJP	
Minister of Social Justice and Empowerment	Virendra Kumar Khatik	7 July 2021	9 June 2024	BJP	
Minister of External Affairs	S. Jaishankar	31 May 2019	9 June 2024	BJP	
Minister of Human Resource Development	Ramesh Pokhriyal	31 May 2019	29 July 2020	BJP	Renamed as Ministry of Education.
Minister of Education	Ramesh Pokhriyal	29 July 2020	7 July 2021	BJP	
Minister of Education	Dharmendra Pradhan	7 July 2021	9 June 2024	BJP	
Minister of Tribal Affairs	Arjun Munda	31 May 2019	9 June 2024	BJP	
Minister of Women and Child Development	Smriti Irani	31 May 2019	9 June 2024	BJP	
Minister of Textiles	Smriti Irani	31 May 2019	7 July 2021	BJP	
Minister of Textiles	Piyush Goyal	7 July 2021	9 June 2024	BJP	
Minister of Health and Family Welfare	Harsh Vardhan	31 May 2019	7 July 2021	BJP	
Minister of Health and Family Welfare	Mansukh Mandaviya	7 July 2021	9 June 2024	BJP	
Minister of Science and Technology	Harsh Vardhan	31 May 2019	7 July 2021	BJP	
Minister of Science and Technology	Jitendra Singh	7 July 2021	9 June 2024	BJP	Minister of State (I/C) is responsible.
Minister of Earth Sciences	Harsh Vardhan	31 May 2019	7 July 2021	BJP	
Minister of Earth Sciences	Jitendra Singh	7 July 2021	18 May 2023	BJP	Minister of State (I/C) was responsible.
Minister of Earth Sciences	Kiren Rijiju	18 May 2023	9 June 2024	BJP	
Minister of Environment, Forest and Climate Change	Prakash Javadekar	31 May 2019	7 July 2021	BJP	
Minister of Environment, Forest and Climate Change	Bhupender Yadav	7 July 2021	9 June 2024	BJP	
Minister of Information and Broadcasting	Prakash Javadekar	31 May 2019	7 July 2021	BJP	
Minister of Information and Broadcasting	Anurag Singh Thakur	7 July 2021	9 June 2024	BJP	
Minister of Railways	Piyush Goyal	31 May 2019	7 July 2021	BJP	
Minister of Railways	Ashwini Vaishnaw	7 July 2021	9 June 2024	BJP	
Minister of Commerce and Industry	Piyush Goyal	31 May 2019	9 June 2024	BJP	
Minister of Petroleum and Natural Gas	Dharmendra Pradhan	31 May 2019	7 July 2021	BJP	
Minister of Petroleum and Natural Gas	Hardeep Singh Puri	7 July 2021	9 June 2024	BJP	
Minister of Steel	Dharmendra Pradhan	31 May 2019	7 July 2021	BJP	
Minister of Steel	Ramchandra Prasad Singh	7 July 2021	6 July 2022	JD(U)	Resigned.
Minister of Steel	Jyotiraditya Scindia	6 July 2022	9 June 2024	BJP	Additional charge following resignation of Ramchandra Prasad Singh.
Minister of Minority Affairs	Mukhtar Abbas Naqvi	31 May 2019	6 July 2022	BJP	Resigned.
Minister of Minority Affairs	Smriti Irani	6 July 2022	9 June 2024	BJP	Additional charge following resignation of Mukhtar Abbas Naqvi.
Minister of Parliamentary Affairs; Minister of Coal; Minister of Mines	Prahlad Joshi	31 May 2019	9 June 2024	BJP	
Minister of Skill Development and Entrepreneurship	Mahendra Nath Pandey	31 May 2019	7 July 2021	BJP	
Minister of Skill Development and Entrepreneurship	Dharmendra Pradhan	7 July 2021	9 June 2024	BJP	
Minister of Heavy Industries and Public Enterprises	Arvind Sawant	31 May 2019	12 November 2019	SS	Resigned.
Minister of Heavy Industries and Public Enterprises	Prakash Javadekar	12 November 2019	7 July 2021	BJP	Additional charge following resignation of Arvind Sawant. The ministry was bifurcated into Ministry of Heavy Industries and Department of Public Enterprises.
Minister of Heavy Industries	Mahendra Nath Pandey	7 July 2021	9 June 2024	BJP	
Minister of Fisheries, Animal Husbandry and Dairying	Giriraj Singh	31 May 2019	7 July 2021	BJP	
Minister of Fisheries, Animal Husbandry and Dairying	Parshottam Rupala	7 July 2021	9 June 2024	BJP	
Minister of Jal Shakti	Gajendra Singh Shekhawat	31 May 2019	9 June 2024	BJP	
Minister of Labour and Employment	Santosh Kumar Gangwar	31 May 2019	7 July 2021	BJP	Minister of State (I/C) was responsible.
Minister of Labour and Employment	Bhupender Yadav	7 July 2021	9 June 2024	BJP	
Minister of AYUSH	Shripad Yesso Naik	31 May 2019	7 July 2021	BJP	Minister of State (I/C) was responsible.
Minister of AYUSH	Kiren Rijiju (Acting)	19 January 2021	7 July 2021	BJP	Minister of State (I/C) was responsible. Additional charge during period of indisposition of Shripad Yesso Naik.
Minister of AYUSH	Sarbananda Sonowal	7 July 2021	9 June 2024	BJP	
Minister of Development of North Eastern Region	Jitendra Singh	31 May 2019	7 July 2021	BJP	Minister of State (I/C) was responsible.
Minister of Development of North Eastern Region	G. Kishan Reddy	7 July 2021	9 June 2024	BJP	
Minister of Youth Affairs and Sports	Kiren Rijiju	31 May 2019	7 July 2021	BJP	Minister of State (I/C) was responsible.
Minister of Youth Affairs and Sports	Anurag Singh Thakur	7 July 2021	9 June 2024	BJP	
Minister of Culture; Minister of Tourism	Prahlad Singh Patel	31 May 2019	7 July 2021	BJP	Minister of State (I/C) was responsible.
Minister of Culture; Minister of Tourism	G. Kishan Reddy	7 July 2021	9 June 2024	BJP	
Minister of Power; Minister of New and Renewable Energy	Raj Kumar Singh	31 May 2019	7 July 2021	BJP	Minister of State (I/C) was responsible.
Minister of Power; Minister of New and Renewable Energy	Raj Kumar Singh	7 July 2021	9 June 2024	BJP	
Minister of Housing and Urban Affairs	Hardeep Singh Puri	31 May 2019	7 July 2021	BJP	Minister of State (I/C) was responsible.
Minister of Housing and Urban Affairs	Hardeep Singh Puri	7 July 2021	9 June 2024	BJP	
Minister of Civil Aviation	Hardeep Singh Puri	31 May 2019	7 July 2021	BJP	Minister of State (I/C) was responsible.
Minister of Civil Aviation	Jyotiraditya Scindia	7 July 2021	9 June 2024	BJP	
Minister of Shipping	Mansukh Mandaviya	31 May 2019	10 November 2020	BJP	Minister of State (I/C) was responsible. Ministry renamed as Ports, Shipping and Waterways.
Minister of Ports, Shipping and Waterways	Mansukh Mandaviya	10 November 2020	7 July 2021	BJP	Minister of State (I/C) was responsible.
Minister of Ports, Shipping and Waterways	Sarbananda Sonowal	7 July 2021	9 June 2024	BJP	
Minister of Co-operation	Amit Shah	7 July 2021	9 June 2024	BJP	

=== Ministers of State (Independent Charge) ===
Portfolio	Minister	Took office	Left office	Party	Remarks
Minister of State (Independent Charge) of Statistics and Programme Implementation; Minister of State (Independent Charge) of Planning	Rao Inderjit Singh	31 May 2019	9 June 2024	BJP	

=== Ministers of State ===
Portfolio	Minister	Took office	Left office	Party	Remarks
Minister of State in the Ministry of Defence	Shripad Yesso Naik	31 May 2019	7 July 2021	BJP	
Minister of State in the Ministry of Defence	Ajay Bhatt	7 July 2021	9 June 2024	BJP	
Minister of State in the Prime Minister's Office; Minister of State in the Ministry of Personnel, Public Grievances and Pensions; Minister of State in the Department of Atomic Energy; Minister of State in the Department of Space	Jitendra Singh	31 May 2019	9 June 2024	BJP	
Minister of State in the Ministry of Minority Affairs	Kiren Rijiju	31 May 2019	7 July 2021	BJP	
Minister of State in the Ministry of Minority Affairs	John Barla	7 July 2021	9 June 2024	BJP	
Minister of State in the Ministry of Skill Development and Entrepreneurship	Raj Kumar Singh	31 May 2019	7 July 2021	BJP	
Minister of State in the Ministry of Skill Development and Entrepreneurship	Rajeev Chandrasekhar	7 July 2021	9 June 2024	BJP	
Minister of State in the Ministry of Commerce and Industry	Hardeep Singh Puri	31 May 2019	7 July 2021	BJP	
Minister of State in the Ministry of Commerce and Industry	Som Prakash	31 May 2019	9 June 2024	BJP	
Minister of State in the Ministry of Commerce and Industry	Anupriya Singh Patel	7 July 2021	9 June 2024	AD(S)	
Minister of State in the Ministry of Chemicals and Fertilizers	Mansukh Mandaviya	31 May 2019	7 July 2021	BJP	
Minister of State in the Ministry of Chemicals and Fertilizers	Bhagwanth Khuba	7 July 2021	9 June 2024	BJP	
Minister of State in the Ministry of Steel	Faggan Singh Kulaste	31 May 2019	9 June 2024	BJP	
Minister of State in the Ministry of Health and Family Welfare	Ashwini Kumar Choubey	31 May 2019	7 July 2021	BJP	
Minister of State in the Ministry of Health and Family Welfare	Bharati Pawar	7 July 2021	9 June 2024	BJP	
Minister of State in the Ministry of Health and Family Welfare	S. P. Singh Baghel	18 May 2023	9 June 2024	BJP	
Minister of State in the Ministry of Parliamentary Affairs	Arjun Ram Meghwal	31 May 2019	9 June 2024	BJP	
Minister of State in the Ministry of Parliamentary Affairs	V. Muraleedharan	31 May 2019	9 June 2024	BJP	
Minister of State in the Ministry of Heavy Industries and Public Enterprises	Arjun Ram Meghwal	31 May 2019	7 July 2021	BJP	The ministry was bifurcated into the Ministry of Heavy Industries and the Department of Public Enterprises.
Minister of State in the Ministry of Heavy Industries	Krishan Pal Gurjar	7 July 2021	9 June 2024	BJP	
Minister of State in the Ministry of Road Transport and Highways	V. K. Singh	31 May 2019	9 June 2024	BJP	
Minister of State in the Ministry of Social Justice and Empowerment	Krishan Pal Gurjar	31 May 2019	7 July 2021	BJP	
Minister of State in the Ministry of Social Justice and Empowerment	Ramdas Athawale	31 May 2019	9 June 2024	RPI(A)	
Minister of State in the Ministry of Social Justice and Empowerment	Rattan Lal Kataria	31 May 2019	7 July 2021	BJP	
Minister of State in the Ministry of Social Justice and Empowerment	A. Narayanaswamy	7 July 2021	9 June 2024	BJP	
Minister of State in the Ministry of Social Justice and Empowerment	Pratima Bhoumik	7 July 2021	9 June 2024	BJP	
Minister of State in the Ministry of Consumer Affairs, Food and Public Distribution	Raosaheb Danve	31 May 2019	7 July 2021	BJP	
Minister of State in the Ministry of Consumer Affairs, Food and Public Distribution	Ashwini Kumar Choubey	7 July 2021	9 June 2024	BJP	
Minister of State in the Ministry of Consumer Affairs, Food and Public Distribution	Niranjan Jyoti	7 July 2021	9 June 2024	BJP	
Minister of State in the Ministry of Home Affairs	G. Kishan Reddy	31 May 2019	7 July 2021	BJP	
Minister of State in the Ministry of Home Affairs	Nityanand Rai	31 May 2019	9 June 2024	BJP	
Minister of State in the Ministry of Home Affairs	Ajay Mishra Teni	7 July 2021	9 June 2024	BJP	
Minister of State in the Ministry of Home Affairs	Nisith Pramanik	7 July 2021	9 June 2024	BJP	
Minister of State in the Ministry of Agriculture and Farmers' Welfare	Parshottam Rupala	31 May 2019	7 July 2021	BJP	
Minister of State in the Ministry of Agriculture and Farmers' Welfare	Kailash Choudhary	31 May 2019	9 June 2024	BJP	
Minister of State in the Ministry of Agriculture and Farmers' Welfare	Shobha Karandlaje	7 July 2021	9 June 2024	BJP	
Minister of State in the Ministry of Rural Development	Niranjan Jyoti	31 May 2019	9 June 2024	BJP	
Minister of State in the Ministry of Rural Development	Faggan Singh Kulaste	7 July 2021	9 June 2024	BJP	
Minister of State in the Ministry of Environment, Forest and Climate Change	Babul Supriyo	31 May 2019	7 July 2021	BJP	
Minister of State in the Ministry of Environment, Forest and Climate Change	Ashwini Kumar Choubey	7 July 2021	9 June 2024	BJP	
Minister of State in the Ministry of Fisheries, Animal Husbandry and Dairying	Sanjeev Balyan	31 May 2019	9 June 2024	BJP	
Minister of State in the Ministry of Fisheries, Animal Husbandry and Dairying	Pratap Chandra Sarangi	31 May 2019	7 July 2021	BJP	
Minister of State in the Ministry of Fisheries, Animal Husbandry and Dairying	L. Murugan	7 July 2021	9 June 2024	BJP	
Minister of State in the Ministry of Human Resource Development	Sanjay Shamrao Dhotre	31 May 2019	29 July 2020	BJP	Renamed as Ministry of Education.
Minister of State in the Ministry of Education	Sanjay Shamrao Dhotre	29 July 2020	7 July 2021	BJP	
Minister of State in the Ministry of Education	Annpurna Devi	7 July 2021	9 June 2024	BJP	
Minister of State in the Ministry of Education	Subhas Sarkar	7 July 2021	9 June 2024	BJP	
Minister of State in the Ministry of Education	Rajkumar Ranjan Singh	7 July 2021	9 June 2024	BJP	
Minister of State in the Ministry of Communications	Sanjay Shamrao Dhotre	31 May 2019	July 2021	BJP	
Minister of State in the Ministry of Communications	Devusinh Chauhan	7 July 2021	9 June 2024	BJP	
Minister of State in the Ministry of Electronics and Information Technology	Sanjay Shamrao Dhotre	31 May 2019	7 July 2021	BJP	
Minister of State in the Ministry of Electronics and Information Technology	Rajeev Chandrasekhar	7 July 2021	9 June 2024	BJP	
Minister of State in the Ministry of Finance	Anurag Singh Thakur	31 May 2019	7 July 2021	BJP	
Minister of State in the Ministry of Finance	Pankaj Chaudhary	7 July 2021	9 June 2024	BJP	
Minister of State in the Ministry of Finance	Bhagwat Karad	7 July 2021	9 June 2024	BJP	
Minister of State in the Ministry of Corporate Affairs	Anurag Singh Thakur	31 May 2019	7 July 2021	BJP	
Minister of State in the Ministry of Corporate Affairs	Rao Inderjit Singh	7 July 2021	9 June 2024	BJP	
Minister of State in the Ministry of Railways	Suresh Angadi	31 May 2019	23 September 2020	BJP	Died on 23 September 2020.
Minister of State in the Ministry of Railways	Raosaheb Danve	7 July 2021	9 June 2024	BJP	
Minister of State in the Ministry of Railways	Darshana Jardosh	7 July 2021	9 June 2024	BJP	
Minister of State in the Ministry of Jal Shakti	Rattan Lal Kataria	31 May 2019	7 July 2021	BJP	
Minister of State in the Ministry of Jal Shakti	Prahlad Singh Patel	7 July 2021	7 December 2023	BJP	Resigned.
Minister of State in the Ministry of Jal Shakti	Bishweswar Tudu	7 July 2021	9 June 2024	BJP	
Minister of State in the Ministry of Jal Shakti	Rajeev Chandrasekhar	7 December 2023	9 June 2024	BJP	
Minister of State in the Ministry of External Affairs	V. Muraleedharan	31 May 2019	9 June 2024	BJP	
Minister of State in the Ministry of External Affairs	Meenakshi Lekhi	7 July 2021	9 June 2024	BJP	
Minister of State in the Ministry of External Affairs	Rajkumar Ranjan Singh	7 July 2021	9 June 2024	BJP	
Minister of State in the Ministry of Tribal Affairs	Renuka Singh Saruta	31 May 2019	7 December 2023	BJP	Resigned.
Minister of State in the Ministry of Tribal Affairs	Bishweswar Tudu	7 July 2021	9 June 2024	BJP	
Minister of State in the Ministry of Tribal Affairs	Bharati Pawar	7 December 2023	9 June 2024	BJP	
Minister of State in the Ministry of Food Processing Industries	Rameswar Teli	31 May 2019	7 July 2021	BJP	
Minister of State in the Ministry of Food Processing Industries	Prahlad Singh Patel	7 July 2021	7 December 2023	BJP	Resigned.
Minister of State in the Ministry of Food Processing Industries	Shobha Karandlaje	7 December 2023	9 June 2024	BJP	
Minister of State in the Ministry of Micro, Small and Medium Enterprises	Pratap Chandra Sarangi	31 May 2019	7 July 2021	BJP	
Minister of State in the Ministry of Micro, Small and Medium Enterprises	Bhanu Pratap Singh Verma	7 July 2021	9 June 2024	BJP	
Minister of State in the Ministry of Women and Child Development	Debasree Chaudhuri	31 May 2019	7 July 2021	BJP	
Minister of State in the Ministry of Women and Child Development	Mahendra Munjapara	7 July 2021	9 June 2024	BJP	
Minister of State in the Ministry of Ports, Shipping and Waterways	Shripad Yesso Naik	7 July 2021	9 June 2024	BJP	
Minister of State in the Ministry of Ports, Shipping and Waterways	Shantanu Thakur	7 July 2021	9 June 2024	BJP	
Minister of State in the Ministry of Tourism	Shripad Yesso Naik	7 July 2021	9 June 2024	BJP	
Minister of State in the Ministry of Tourism	Ajay Bhatt	7 July 2021	9 June 2024	BJP	
Minister of State in the Ministry of Culture	Arjun Ram Meghwal	7 July 2021	9 June 2024	BJP	
Minister of State in the Ministry of Culture	Meenakshi Lekhi	7 July 2021	9 June 2024	BJP	
Minister of State in the Ministry of Civil Aviation	V. K. Singh	7 July 2021	9 June 2024	BJP	
Minister of State in the Ministry of Power	Krishan Pal Gurjar	7 July 2021	9 June 2024	BJP	
Minister of State in the Ministry of Coal; Minister of State in the Ministry of Mines	Raosaheb Danve	7 July 2021	9 June 2024	BJP	
Minister of State in the Ministry of Law and Justice	S. P. Singh Baghel	7 July 2021	18 May 2023	BJP	
Minister of State in the Ministry of Textiles	Darshana Jardosh	7 July 2021	9 June 2024	BJP	
Minister of State in the Ministry of Petroleum and Natural Gas; Minister of State in the Ministry of Labour and Employment	Rameswar Teli	7 July 2021	9 June 2024	BJP	
Minister of State in the Ministry of Housing and Urban Affairs	Kaushal Kishore	7 July 2021	9 June 2024	BJP	
Minister of State in the Ministry of Development of North Eastern Region; Minister of State in the Ministry of Co-operation	B. L. Verma	7 July 2021	9 June 2024	BJP	
Minister of State in the Ministry of New and Renewable Energy	Bhagwanth Khuba	7 July 2021	9 June 2024	BJP	
Minister of State in the Ministry of Panchayati Raj	Kapil Patil	7 July 2021	9 June 2024	BJP	
Minister of State in the Ministry of AYUSH	Mahendra Munjapara	7 July 2021	9 June 2024	BJP	
Minister of State in the Ministry of Information and Broadcasting	L. Murugan	7 July 2021	9 June 2024	BJP	
Minister of State in the Ministry of Youth Affairs and Sports	Nisith Pramanik	7 July 2021	9 June 2024	BJP	

== Demographics ==
Representation of cabinet ministers by party
1. Bharatiya Janata Party (97.2%)
2. Republican Party of India (Athawale) (1.39%)
3. Apna Dal (Soneylal) (1.39%)

=== Parties ===
Party	Cabinet Ministers	Ministers of State (I/C)	Ministers of State	Total number of ministers
BJP	27 (Note: Including Prime Minister)	3	40	70
RPI (A)	0	0	1	1
AD (S)	0	0	1	1
Total	27	3	42	72

=== States ===
State	Cabinet Ministers	Ministers of State (I/C)	Ministers of State	Total number of ministers	Name of ministers
Arunachal Pradesh	1	—	—	1	Kiren Rijiju
Assam	1	—	1	1	Sarbananda Sonowal; Rameswar Teli
Bihar	2	—	2	4	Giriraj Singh; Raj Kumar Singh; Ashwini Kumar Choubey; Nityanand Rai
Goa	—	—	1	1	Shripad Yesso Naik
Gujarat	4	—	3	7	Amit Shah; S. Jaishankar; Mansukh Mandaviya; Parshottam Rupala; Darshana Jardosh; Devusinh Chauhan; Mahendra Munjapara
Haryana	—	1	1	2	Rao Inderjit Singh; Krishan Pal Gurjar
Himachal Pradesh	1	—	—	1	Anurag Singh Thakur
Jharkhand	1	—	1	2	Arjun Munda; Annpurna Devi
Karnataka	2	—	4	6	Nirmala Sitharaman; Prahlad Joshi; Rajeev Chandrasekhar; Shobha Karandlaje; A. Narayanaswamy; Bhagwanth Khuba
Madhya Pradesh	3	—	2	5	Dharmendra Pradhan; Virendra Kumar Khatik; Jyotiraditya Scindia; Faggan Singh Kulaste; L. Murugan
Maharashtra	3	—	6	9	Nitin Gadkari; Piyush Goyal; Narayan Rane; Raosaheb Danve; Ramdas Athawale; V. Muraleedharan; Kapil Patil; Bhagwat Karad; Bharati Pawar
Manipur	—	—	1	1	Rajkumar Ranjan Singh
Odisha	1	—	1	2	Ashwini Vaishnaw; Bishweswar Tudu
Punjab	—	—	1	1	Som Prakash
Rajasthan	2	1	1	4	Gajendra Singh Shekhawat; Bhupender Yadav; Arjun Ram Meghwal; Kailash Choudhary
Telangana	1	—	—	1	G. Kishan Reddy
Tripura	—	—	1	1	Pratima Bhoumik
Uttar Pradesh	5	—	10	15	Narendra Modi (Prime Minister); Rajnath Singh; Smriti Irani; Hardeep Singh Puri; Mahendra Nath Pandey; V. K. Singh; Niranjan Jyoti; Sanjeev Balyan; Pankaj Chaudhary; Anupriya Singh Patel; S. P. Singh Baghel; Bhanu Pratap Singh Verma; Kaushal Kishore; B. L. Verma; Ajay Mishra Teni
Uttarakhand	—	—	1	1	Ajay Bhatt
West Bengal	—	—	4	4	Subhas Sarkar; Shantanu Thakur; John Barla; Nisith Pramanik
Delhi	—	—	1	1	Meenakshi Lekhi
Jammu and Kashmir	—	1	—	1	Jitendra Singh
Total	27	3	42	72	

=== Diversity ===
A June 2019 data analysis by Mint, based on data from Ashoka University's Trivedi Centre for Political Data, compared the council of ministers sworn in on 30 May 2019 with every council since 1952. It found that the council was made up mostly of wealthy men from Hindi-speaking states, a pattern it traced back to the Nehru era.

- Region: 53% of ministers came from Hindi-speaking states, and 23 states and union territories were represented. Uttar Pradesh had the most ministers (nine), as it had in almost every council since 1952, while the southern states had seven. The most geographically diverse council was P. V. Narasimha Rao's in 1991, with members from 26 states and union territories.
- Gender: Six of the 58 ministers (about 10%) were women, three of whom – Nirmala Sitharaman, Smriti Irani and Harsimrat Kaur Badal – held cabinet rank. This was the fewest women in a council of ministers since 1999; worldwide, about one in five ministers is a woman.
- Religion and caste: The council was predominantly Hindu, with two Sikh ministers and one Muslim minister, all 3 representing the minority community. The combined share of Scheduled Caste and Scheduled Tribe ministers was the second highest since 1952. No data was available on Other Backward Class ministers.
- Education: 78% of ministers held at least a bachelor's degree, a share that had fallen with every council since 2004, when it was 95%.
- Wealth: The median declared wealth of ministers was ₹5.6 crore, up from ₹2.5 crore in 2014 and above the ₹4 crore median of the winners of the 2019 Indian general election. Pratap Chandra Sarangi, with declared wealth of ₹13.4 lakh, was a notable exception.

The analysis cited the row over the draft National Education Policy in June 2019, which Sitharaman and S. Jaishankar, both from the south, helped to calm, as an example of why diverse representation matters.

== Demographics of former ministers ==
=== Parties ===
Party	Cabinet Ministers	Ministers of State (I/C)	Ministers of State	Total number of ministers
BJP	8	1	8	17
SS	1	0	0	1
SAD	1	0	0	1
LJP	1	0	0	1
JD (U)	1	0	0	1
RLJP	1	0	0	1
Total	13	1	8	22

=== States ===
State	Cabinet Ministers	Ministers of State (I/C)	Ministers of State	Total number of ministers	Name of ministers
Bihar	4	—	—	4	Ram Vilas Paswan; Ravi Shankar Prasad; Ramchandra Prasad Singh; Pashupati Kumar Paras
Chhattisgarh	—	—	1	1	Renuka Singh
Haryana	—	—	1	1	Rattan Lal Kataria
Jharkhand	1	—	—	1	Mukhtar Abbas Naqvi
Karnataka	1	—	1	2	D. V. Sadananda Gowda; Suresh Angadi
Madhya Pradesh	2	—	1	3	Thawar Chand Gehlot; Narendra Singh Tomar; Prahlad Singh Patel
Maharashtra	2	—	1	3	Prakash Javadekar; Arvind Sawant; Sanjay Shamrao Dhotre
Odisha	—	—	1	1	Pratap Chandra Sarangi
Punjab	1	—	—	1	Harsimrat Kaur Badal
Uttar Pradesh	—	1	—	1	Santosh Kumar Gangwar
Uttarakhand	1	—	—	1	Ramesh Pokhriyal
West Bengal	—	—	2	2	Babul Supriyo; Debasree Chaudhuri
Delhi	1	—	—	1	Harsh Vardhan
Total	13	1	8	22	

== Initiatives ==
According to Shashi Tharoor, some noteworthy achievements are the rapid construction of infrastructure, including new ports, airports and highways, relying on private contractors; modernisation of the rail network of India; strengthening the social safety net for millions of poor Indians; providing toilets, cooking gas cylinders; cash transfers to farmers and access to electricity and drinking water in rural India; progress in technology diffusion; cheap data plans for android phones, connecting nearly a billion Indians to the Internet; enabling private companies to create commons online; stimulating growth in the startup culture, mainly in the tech domain, and several unicorns; digital money transfer via Unified Payments Interface (direct money transfers between bank accounts); reducing middlemen by paying social benefits directly to the accounts of beneficiaries and effective Indian diplomacy, all with high approval ratings.

== See also ==
- National Democratic Alliance
- 2021 Indian cabinet reshuffle
- List of members of the 17th Lok Sabha
- Union Council of Ministers
- Premiership of Narendra Modi
