= Shakti Singh Yadav =

Indian politician

Member of Bihar Legislative Assembly
- In office 2015–2020
- Preceded by: Usha Sinha
- Succeeded by: Krishna Murari Sharan
- Constituency: Hilsa

Personal details
- Born: 1 January 1973 (age 53) Hilsa, Nalanda
- Party: Rashtriya Janata Dal
- Parent: Briz Nandan Singh (father)
- Education: Intermediate
- Profession: Farmer, social worker, politician

Shakti Singh Yadav (born 1 January 1973) is an Indian politician. He was elected to the Bihar Legislative Assembly from Hilsa in the 2015 Bihar Legislative Assembly election as a member of the Rashtriya Janata Dal. He is currently Spokesperson of Rashtriya Janata Dal.
