= List of members of the 17th Lok Sabha =

Members of Lok Sabha (2019-24)

Seat distribution in 17th Lok Sabha by party

This is a list of members of the 17th Lok Sabha arranged by the states and union territories they were elected from. These MPs were elected in the 2019 Indian general election held in April–May 2019, and took their seats on 17 June of that year.

== Andhra Pradesh ==
Keys: YSRCP (22) TDP (3)

#	Constituency	Name	Party
1	Araku (ST)	Goddeti Madhavi	YSR Congress Party
2	Srikakulam	Ram Mohan Naidu Kinjarapu	Telugu Desam Party
3	Vizianagaram	Bellana Chandra Sekhar	YSR Congress Party
4	Visakhapatnam	M. V. V. Satyanarayana	YSR Congress Party
5	Anakapalli	Beesetti Venkata Satyavathi	YSR Congress Party
6	Kakinada	Vanga Geetha	YSR Congress Party
7	Amalapuram (SC)	Chinta Anuradha	YSR Congress Party
8	Rajahmundry	Margani Bharat	YSR Congress Party
9	Narasapuram	Raghu Rama Krishna Raju (Switched from YSRCP to TDP)	YSR Congress Party
9	Narasapuram	Raghu Rama Krishna Raju (Switched from YSRCP to TDP)	Telugu Desam Party
10	Eluru	Kotagiri Sridhar	YSR Congress Party
11	Machilipatnam	Vallabhaneni Balasouri (Switched from YSRCP to JSP)	YSR Congress Party
11	Machilipatnam	Vallabhaneni Balasouri (Switched from YSRCP to JSP)	Jana Sena Party
12	Vijayawada	Kesineni Srinivas (Resigned on 10 January 2024)	Telugu Desam Party
12	Vijayawada	Vacant	
13	Guntur	Galla Jayadev	Telugu Desam Party
14	Narasaraopet	Lavu Sri Krishna Devarayalu (Resigned on 24 January 2024)	YSR Congress Party
14	Narasaraopet	Vacant	
15	Bapatla (SC)	Nandigam Suresh	YSR Congress Party
16	Ongole	Magunta Sreenivasulu Reddy (Switched from YSRCP to TDP)	YSR Congress Party
16	Ongole	Magunta Sreenivasulu Reddy (Switched from YSRCP to TDP)	Telugu Desam Party
17	Nandyal	Pocha Brahmananda Reddy	YSR Congress Party
18	Kurnool	Sanjeev Kumar (Resigned on 10 January 2024)	YSR Congress Party
18	Kurnool	Vacant	
19	Anantapur	Talari Rangaiah	YSR Congress Party
20	Hindupur	Kuruva Gorantla Madhav	YSR Congress Party
21	Kadapa	Y. S. Avinash Reddy	YSR Congress Party
22	Nellore	Adala Prabhakara Reddy	YSR Congress Party
23	Tirupati (SC)	Balli Durga Prasad Rao (Died on 16 September 2020)	YSR Congress Party
23	Tirupati (SC)	Maddila Gurumoorthy (Elected on 2 May 2021)	YSR Congress Party
24	Rajampet	P. V. Midhun Reddy	YSR Congress Party
25	Chittoor (SC)	N. Reddeppa	YSR Congress Party

== Arunachal Pradesh ==
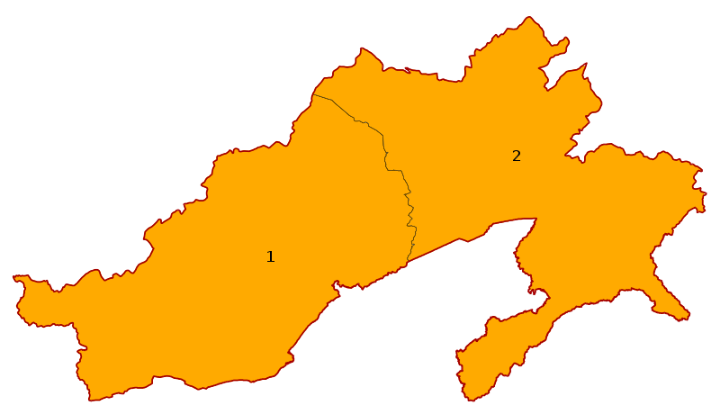
Arunachal Pradesh constituencies

Keys: BJP (2)

#	Constituency	Name	Party
1	Arunachal West	Kiren Rijiju	Bharatiya Janata Party
2	Arunachal East	Tapir Gao	Bharatiya Janata Party

== Assam ==
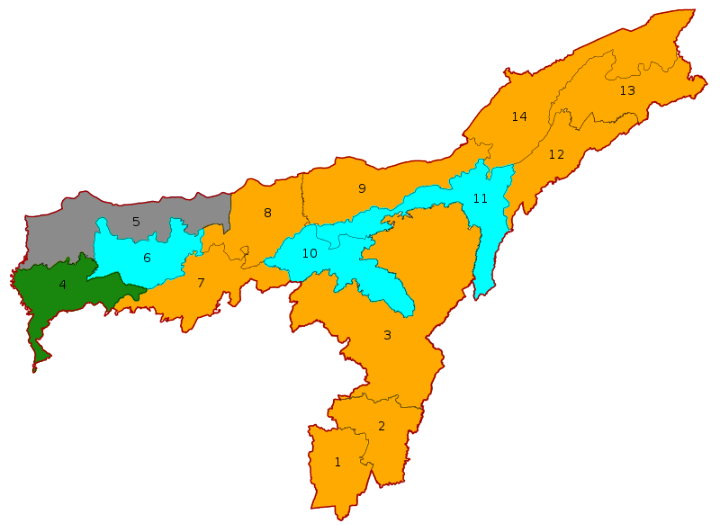
Assam constituencies

Keys: BJP (9) INC (3) AIUDF (1) Independent (1)

#	Constituency	Name	Party
1	Karimganj (SC)	Kripanath Mallah	Bharatiya Janata Party
2	Silchar	Rajdeep Roy	Bharatiya Janata Party
3	Autonomous District (ST)	Horen Sing Bey	Bharatiya Janata Party
4	Dhubri	Badruddin Ajmal	All India United Democratic Front
5	Kokrajhar (ST)	Naba Kumar Sarania	Independent
6	Barpeta	Abdul Khaleque	Indian National Congress
7	Gauhati	Queen Oja	Bharatiya Janata Party
8	Mangaldoi	Dilip Saikia	Bharatiya Janata Party
9	Tezpur	Pallab Lochan Das	Bharatiya Janata Party
10	Nowgong	Pradyut Bordoloi	Indian National Congress
11	Kaliabor	Gaurav Gogoi	Indian National Congress
12	Jorhat	Topon Kumar Gogoi	Bharatiya Janata Party
13	Dibrugarh	Rameswar Teli	Bharatiya Janata Party
14	Lakhimpur	Pradan Baruah	Bharatiya Janata Party

== Bihar ==
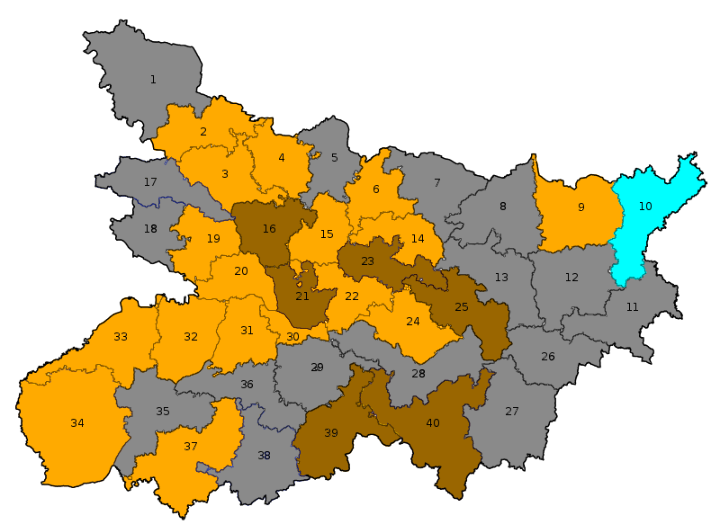
Bihar constituencies

Keys: BJP (17) JD(U) (16) RLJP (4) INC (1) LJP(RV) (1) RJD (1)

#	Constituency	Name	Party
1	Valmiki Nagar	Baidyanath Prasad Mahto (Died on 28 February 2020)	Janata Dal (United)
1	Valmiki Nagar	Sunil Kumar (Elected on 10 November 2020)	Janata Dal (United)
2	Paschim Champaran	Sanjay Jaiswal	Bharatiya Janata Party
3	Purvi Champaran	Radha Mohan Singh	Bharatiya Janata Party
4	Sheohar	Rama Devi	Bharatiya Janata Party
5	Sitamarhi	Sunil Kumar Pintu	Janata Dal (United)
6	Madhubani	Ashok Kumar Yadav	Bharatiya Janata Party
7	Jhanjharpur	Ramprit Mandal	Janata Dal (United)
8	Supaul	Dileshwar Kamait	Janata Dal (United)
9	Araria	Pradeep Kumar Singh	Bharatiya Janata Party
10	Kishanganj	Mohammad Jawed	Indian National Congress
11	Katihar	Dulal Chandra Goswami	Janata Dal (United)
12	Purnia	Santosh Kumar	Janata Dal (United)
13	Madhepura	Dinesh Chandra Yadav	Janata Dal (United)
14	Darbhanga	Gopal Jee Thakur	Bharatiya Janata Party
15	Muzaffarpur	Ajay Nishad	Bharatiya Janata Party
16	Vaishali	Veena Devi	Rashtriya Lok Janshakti Party
17	Gopalganj (SC)	Alok Kumar Suman	Janata Dal (United)
18	Siwan	Kavita Singh	Janata Dal (United)
19	Maharajganj	Janardan Singh Sigriwal	Bharatiya Janata Party
20	Saran	Rajiv Pratap Rudy	Bharatiya Janata Party
21	Hajipur (SC)	Pashupati Kumar Paras	Rashtriya Lok Janshakti Party
22	Ujiarpur	Nityanand Rai	Bharatiya Janata Party
23	Samastipur (SC)	Ram Chandra Paswan (Died on 21 July 2019)	Lok Janshakti Party
23	Samastipur (SC)	Prince Raj (Elected on 24 October 2019)	Rashtriya Lok Janshakti Party
24	Begusarai	Giriraj Singh	Bharatiya Janata Party
25	Khagaria	Mehboob Ali Kaiser (Switched from RLJP to RJD)	Rashtriya Janata Dal
26	Bhagalpur	Ajay Kumar Mandal	Janata Dal (United)
27	Banka	Giridhari Yadav	Janata Dal (United)
28	Munger	Lalan Singh	Janata Dal (United)
29	Nalanda	Kaushalendra Kumar	Janata Dal (United)
30	Patna Sahib	Ravi Shankar Prasad	Bharatiya Janata Party
31	Pataliputra	Ram Kripal Yadav	Bharatiya Janata Party
32	Arrah	Raj Kumar Singh	Bharatiya Janata Party
33	Buxar	Ashwini Kumar Choubey	Bharatiya Janata Party
34	Sasaram (SC)	Chhedi Paswan	Bharatiya Janata Party
35	Karakat	Mahabali Singh	Janata Dal (United)
36	Jahanabad	Chandeshwar Prasad	Janata Dal (United)
37	Aurangabad	Sushil Kumar Singh	Bharatiya Janata Party
38	Gaya (SC)	Vijay Kumar Manjhi	Janata Dal (United)
39	Nawada	Chandan Singh	Rashtriya Lok Janshakti Party
40	Jamui (SC)	Chirag Paswan	Lok Janshakti Party (Ram Vilas)

== Chhattisgarh ==
Keys: BJP (6) INC (2) Vacant (3)

#	Constituency	Name	Party
1	Sarguja (ST)	Renuka Singh (Resigned on 6 December 2023)	Bharatiya Janata Party
1	Sarguja (ST)	Vacant	
2	Raigarh (ST)	Gomati Sai (Resigned on 6 December 2023)	Bharatiya Janata Party
2	Raigarh (ST)	Vacant	
3	Janjgir–Champa (SC)	Guharam Ajgalle	Bharatiya Janata Party
4	Korba	Jyotsna Mahant	Indian National Congress
5	Bilaspur	Arun Sao (Resigned on 6 December 2023)	Bharatiya Janata Party
5	Bilaspur	Vacant	
6	Rajnandgaon	Santosh Pandey	Bharatiya Janata Party
7	Durg	Vijay Baghel	Bharatiya Janata Party
8	Raipur	Sunil Kumar Soni	Bharatiya Janata Party
9	Mahasamund	Chunni Lal Sahu	Bharatiya Janata Party
10	Bastar (ST)	Deepak Baij	Indian National Congress
11	Kanker (ST)	Mohan Mandavi	Bharatiya Janata Party

== Goa ==
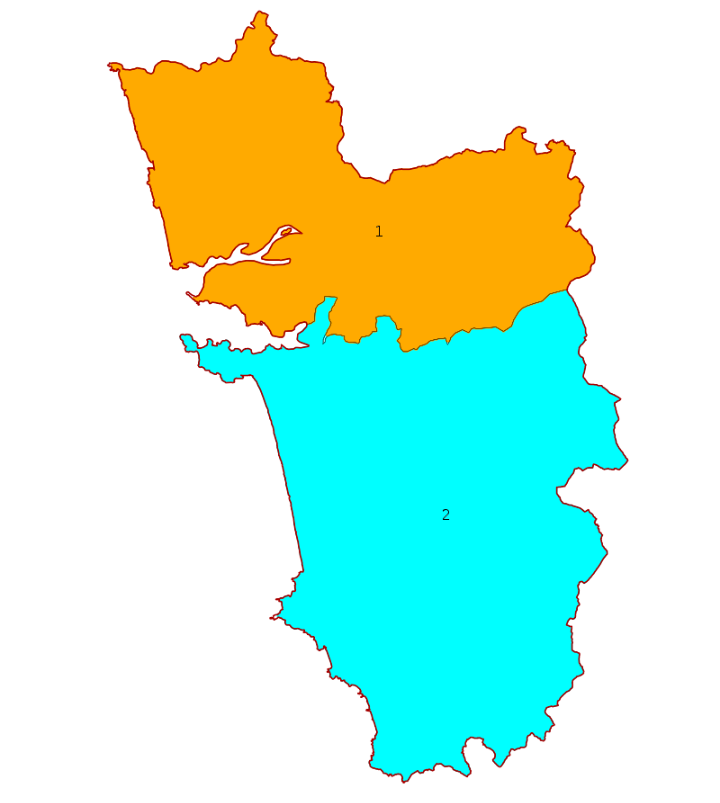
Goa constituencies

Keys: BJP (1) INC (1)

#	Constituency	Name	Party
1	North Goa	Shripad Yesso Naik	Bharatiya Janata Party
2	South Goa	Francisco Sardinha	Indian National Congress

== Gujarat ==
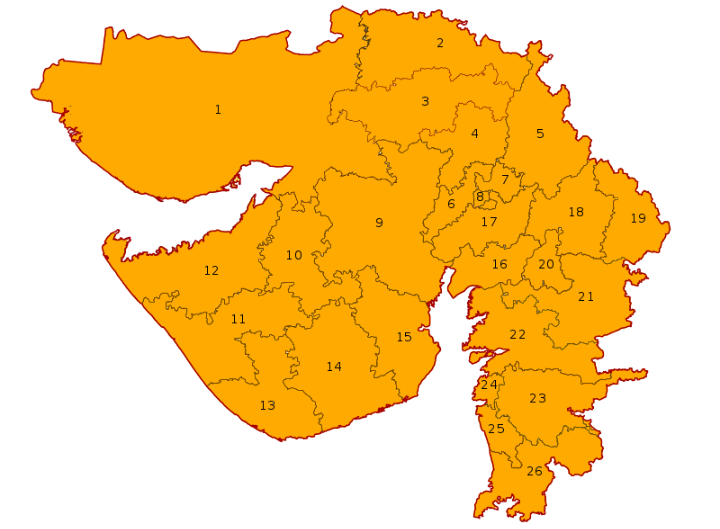
Gujarat constituencies

Keys: BJP (26)

#	Constituency	Name	Party
1	Kachchh (SC)	Vinodbhai Chavda	Bharatiya Janata Party
2	Banaskantha	Parbatbhai Patel	Bharatiya Janata Party
3	Patan	Bharatsinhji Dabhi	Bharatiya Janata Party
4	Mahesana	Shardaben Patel	Bharatiya Janata Party
5	Sabarkantha	Dipsinh Shankarsinh Rathod	Bharatiya Janata Party
6	Gandhinagar	Amit Shah	Bharatiya Janata Party
7	Ahmedabad East	Hasmukh Patel	Bharatiya Janata Party
8	Ahmedabad West (SC)	Kirit Premjibhai Solanki	Bharatiya Janata Party
9	Surendranagar	Mahendra Munjapara	Bharatiya Janata Party
10	Rajkot	Mohan Kundariya	Bharatiya Janata Party
11	Porbandar	Rameshbhai Dhaduk	Bharatiya Janata Party
12	Jamnagar	Poonamben Maadam	Bharatiya Janata Party
13	Junagadh	Rajesh Chudasama	Bharatiya Janata Party
14	Amreli	Naranbhai Kachhadia	Bharatiya Janata Party
15	Bhavnagar	Bharti Shiyal	Bharatiya Janata Party
16	Anand	Mitesh Rameshbhai Patel	Bharatiya Janata Party
17	Kheda	Devusinh Jesingbhai Chauhan	Bharatiya Janata Party
18	Panchmahal	Ratansinh Rathod	Bharatiya Janata Party
19	Dahod (ST)	Jasvantsinh Sumanbhai Bhabhor	Bharatiya Janata Party
20	Vadodara	Ranjanben Dhananjay Bhatt	Bharatiya Janata Party
21	Chhota Udaipur (ST)	Gitaben Rathva	Bharatiya Janata Party
22	Bharuch	Mansukhbhai Vasava	Bharatiya Janata Party
23	Bardoli (ST)	Parbhubhai Vasava	Bharatiya Janata Party
24	Surat	Darshana Jardosh	Bharatiya Janata Party
25	Navsari	C. R. Patil	Bharatiya Janata Party
26	Valsad (ST)	K C Patel	Bharatiya Janata Party

== Haryana ==
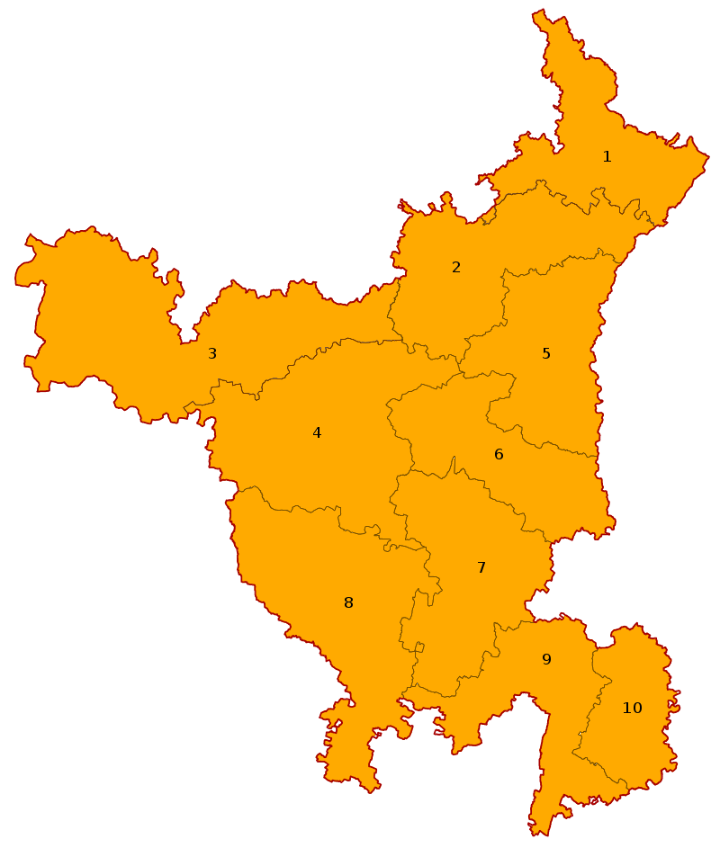
Haryana constituencies

Keys: BJP (8) Vacant (2)

#	Constituency	Name	Party
1	Ambala (SC)	Rattan Lal Kataria (Died on 18 May 2023)	Bharatiya Janata Party
1	Ambala (SC)	Vacant	
2	Kurukshetra	Nayab Singh Saini (Resigned on 12 March 2024)	Bharatiya Janata Party
2	Kurukshetra	Vacant	
3	Sirsa (SC)	Sunita Duggal	Bharatiya Janata Party
4	Hisar	Brijendra Singh	Bharatiya Janata Party
5	Karnal	Sanjay Bhatia	Bharatiya Janata Party
6	Sonipat	Ramesh Chander Kaushik	Bharatiya Janata Party
7	Rohtak	Arvind Kumar Sharma	Bharatiya Janata Party
8	Bhiwani–Mahendragarh	Dharambir Singh	Bharatiya Janata Party
9	Gurgaon	Rao Inderjit Singh	Bharatiya Janata Party
10	Faridabad	Krishan Pal Gurjar	Bharatiya Janata Party

== Himachal Pradesh ==
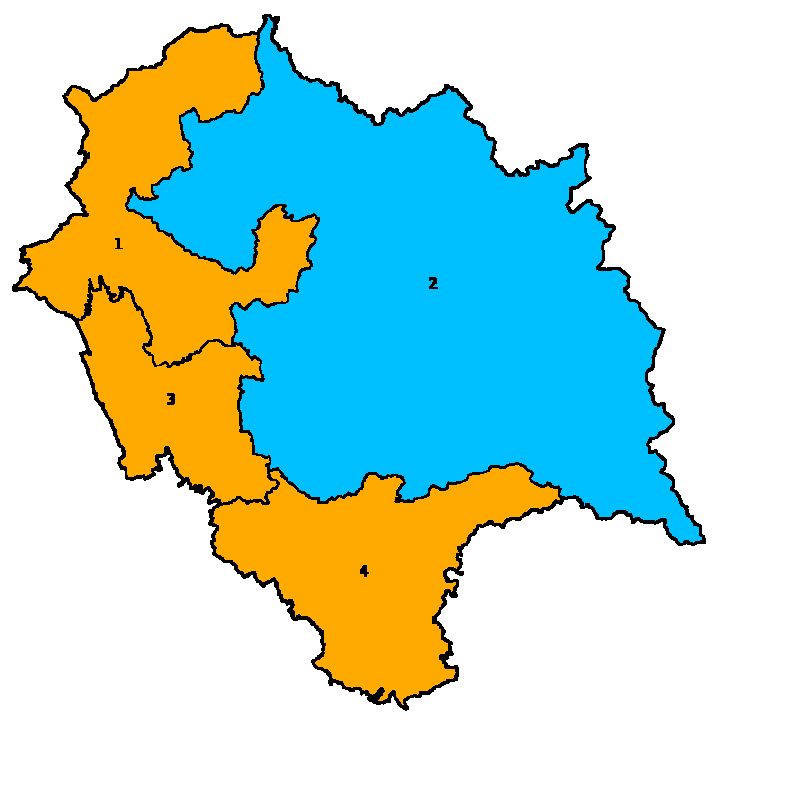
Himachal Pradesh constituencies

Keys: BJP (3) INC (1)

#	Constituency	Name	Party
1	Kangra	Kishan Kapoor	Bharatiya Janata Party
2	Mandi	Ram Swaroop Sharma (Died on 17 March 2021)	Bharatiya Janata Party
2	Mandi	Pratibha Singh (Elected on 2 November 2021)	Indian National Congress
3	Hamirpur	Anurag Thakur	Bharatiya Janata Party
4	Shimla (SC)	Suresh Kumar Kashyap	Bharatiya Janata Party

== Jharkhand ==
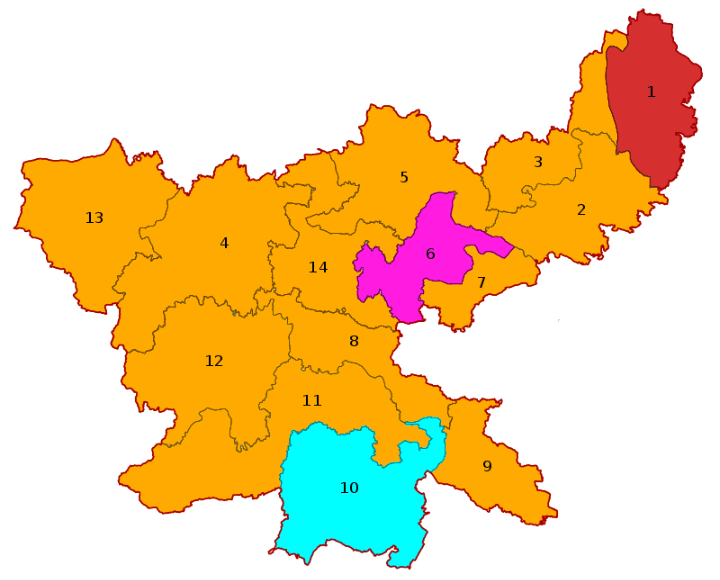
Jharkhand constituencies

Keys: BJP (12) AJSU (1) JMM (1)

#	Constituency	Name	Party
1	Rajmahal (ST)	Vijay Hansdak	Jharkhand Mukti Morcha
2	Dumka (ST)	Sunil Soren	Bharatiya Janata Party
3	Godda	Nishikant Dubey	Bharatiya Janata Party
4	Chatra	Sunil Kumar Singh	Bharatiya Janata Party
5	Kodarma	Annapurna Devi Yadav	Bharatiya Janata Party
6	Giridih	Chandra Prakash Choudhary	All Jharkhand Students Union
7	Dhanbad	Pashupati Nath Singh	Bharatiya Janata Party
8	Ranchi	Sanjay Seth	Bharatiya Janata Party
9	Jamshedpur	Bidyut Baran Mahato	Bharatiya Janata Party
10	Singhbhum (ST)	Geeta Koda (Switched from INC to BJP)	Bharatiya Janata Party
11	Khunti (ST)	Arjun Munda	Bharatiya Janata Party
12	Lohardaga (ST)	Sudarshan Bhagat	Bharatiya Janata Party
13	Palamu (SC)	Vishnu Dayal Ram	Bharatiya Janata Party
14	Hazaribagh	Jayant Sinha	Bharatiya Janata Party

== Karnataka ==
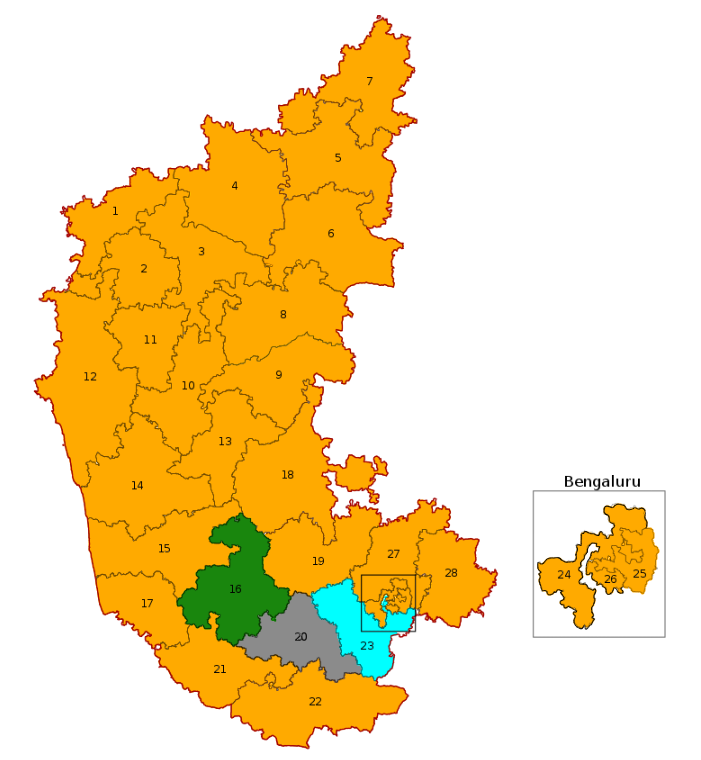
Karnataka constituencies

Keys: BJP (26) INC (1) JD(S) (1)

#	Constituency	Name	Party
1	Chikkodi	Annasaheb Jolle	Bharatiya Janata Party
2	Belgaum	Suresh Angadi (Died on 23 September 2020)	Bharatiya Janata Party
2	Belgaum	Mangala Suresh Angadi (Elected on 2 May 2021)	Bharatiya Janata Party
3	Bagalkot	P. C. Gaddigoudar	Bharatiya Janata Party
4	Bijapur (SC)	Ramesh Jigajinagi	Bharatiya Janata Party
5	Gulbarga (SC)	Umesh. G. Jadhav	Bharatiya Janata Party
6	Raichur (ST)	Raja Amareshwara Naik	Bharatiya Janata Party
7	Bidar	Bhagwanth Khuba	Bharatiya Janata Party
8	Koppal	Karadi Sanganna Amarappa	Bharatiya Janata Party
9	Bellary (ST)	Devendrappa	Bharatiya Janata Party
10	Haveri	Shivkumar Chanabasappa Udasi	Bharatiya Janata Party
11	Dharwad	Pralhad Joshi	Bharatiya Janata Party
12	Uttara Kannada	Anant Kumar Hegde	Bharatiya Janata Party
13	Davanagere	G. M. Siddeshwara	Bharatiya Janata Party
14	Shimoga	B. Y. Raghavendra	Bharatiya Janata Party
15	Udupi Chikmagalur	Shobha Karandlaje	Bharatiya Janata Party
16	Hassan	Prajwal Revanna	Janata Dal (Secular)
17	Dakshina Kannada	Nalin Kumar Kateel	Bharatiya Janata Party
18	Chitradurga (SC)	A. Narayanaswamy	Bharatiya Janata Party
19	Tumkur	G. S. Basavaraj	Bharatiya Janata Party
20	Mandya	Sumalatha Ambareesh (Switched from Independent to BJP)	Bharatiya Janata Party
21	Mysore	Pratap Simha	Bharatiya Janata Party
22	Chamarajanagar (SC)	Srinivasa Prasad	Bharatiya Janata Party
23	Bangalore Rural	D. K. Suresh	Indian National Congress
24	Bangalore North	D. V. Sadananda Gowda	Bharatiya Janata Party
25	Bangalore Central	P. C. Mohan	Bharatiya Janata Party
26	Bangalore South	Tejasvi Surya	Bharatiya Janata Party
27	Chikballapur	B. N. Bache Gowda	Bharatiya Janata Party
28	Kolar (SC)	S. Muniswamy	Bharatiya Janata Party

== Kerala ==
Keys: INC (15) IUML (2) RSP (1) CPI(M) (1) KC(M) (1)

#	Constituency	Name	Party
1	Kasaragod	Rajmohan Unnithan	Indian National Congress
2	Kannur	K. Sudhakaran	Indian National Congress
3	Vatakara	K. Muraleedharan	Indian National Congress
4	Wayanad	Rahul Gandhi	Indian National Congress
5	Kozhikode	M. K. Raghavan	Indian National Congress
6	Malappuram	P. K. Kunhalikutty (Resigned on 3 February 2021)	Indian Union Muslim League
6	Malappuram	M. P. Abdussamad Samadani (Elected on 2 May 2021)	Indian Union Muslim League
7	Ponnani	E. T. Mohammed Basheer	Indian Union Muslim League
8	Palakkad	V. K. Sreekandan	Indian National Congress
9	Alathur (SC)	Ramya Haridas	Indian National Congress
10	Thrissur	T. N. Prathapan	Indian National Congress
11	Chalakudy	Benny Behanan	Indian National Congress
12	Ernakulam	Hibi Eden	Indian National Congress
13	Idukki	Dean Kuriakose	Indian National Congress
14	Kottayam	Thomas Chazhikadan	Kerala Congress (M)
15	Alappuzha	A. M. Ariff	Communist Party of India (Marxist)
16	Mavelikara (SC)	Kodikunnil Suresh	Indian National Congress
17	Pathanamthitta	Anto Antony	Indian National Congress
18	Kollam	N. K. Premachandran	Revolutionary Socialist Party
19	Attingal	Adoor Prakash	Indian National Congress
20	Thiruvananthapuram	Shashi Tharoor	Indian National Congress

== Madhya Pradesh ==
Keys: BJP (23) INC (1) Vacant (5)

#	Constituency	Name	Party
1	Morena	Narendra Singh Tomar (Resigned on 6 December 2023)	Bharatiya Janata Party
1	Morena	Vacant	
2	Bhind (SC)	Sandhya Ray	Bharatiya Janata Party
3	Gwalior	Vivek Shejwalkar	Bharatiya Janata Party
4	Guna	Krishna Pal Singh Yadav	Bharatiya Janata Party
5	Sagar	Raj Bahadur Singh	Bharatiya Janata Party
6	Tikamgarh (SC)	Virendra Kumar	Bharatiya Janata Party
7	Damoh	Prahlad Singh Patel (Resigned on 6 December 2023)	Bharatiya Janata Party
7	Damoh	Vacant	
8	Khajuraho	V. D. Sharma	Bharatiya Janata Party
9	Satna	Ganesh Singh	Bharatiya Janata Party
10	Rewa	Janardan Mishra	Bharatiya Janata Party
11	Sidhi	Riti Pathak (Resigned on 6 December 2023)	Bharatiya Janata Party
11	Sidhi	Vacant	
12	Shahdol (ST)	Himadri Singh	Bharatiya Janata Party
13	Jabalpur	Rakesh Singh (Resigned on 6 December 2023)	Bharatiya Janata Party
13	Jabalpur	Vacant	
14	Mandla (ST)	Faggan Singh Kulaste	Bharatiya Janata Party
15	Balaghat	Dhal Singh Bisen	Bharatiya Janata Party
16	Chhindwara	Nakul Nath	Indian National Congress
17	Hoshangabad	Uday Pratap Singh (Resigned on 6 December 2023)	Bharatiya Janata Party
17	Hoshangabad	Vacant	
18	Vidisha	Ramakant Bhargava	Bharatiya Janata Party
19	Bhopal	Pragya Thakur	Bharatiya Janata Party
20	Rajgarh	Rodmal Nagar	Bharatiya Janata Party
21	Dewas (SC)	Mahendra Solanki	Bharatiya Janata Party
22	Ujjain (SC)	Anil Firojiya	Bharatiya Janata Party
23	Mandsour	Sudheer Gupta	Bharatiya Janata Party
24	Ratlam (ST)	Guman Singh Damor	Bharatiya Janata Party
25	Dhar (ST)	Chattar Singh Darbar	Bharatiya Janata Party
26	Indore	Shankar Lalwani	Bharatiya Janata Party
27	Khargone (ST)	Gajendra Patel	Bharatiya Janata Party
28	Khandwa	Nandkumar Singh Chauhan (Died on 2 March 2021)	Bharatiya Janata Party
28	Khandwa	Gyaneswar Patil (Elected on 2 November 2021)	Bharatiya Janata Party
29	Betul (ST)	Durga Das Uikey	Bharatiya Janata Party

== Maharashtra ==
Keys: BJP (23) SS (13) SS(UBT) (5) NCP-SP (3) NCP (1) AIMIM (1) Vacant (2)

#	Constituency	Name	Party
1	Nandurbar (ST)	Heena Gavit	Bharatiya Janata Party
2	Dhule	Subhash Bhamre	Bharatiya Janata Party
3	Jalgaon	Unmesh Bhaiyyasaheb Patil	Bharatiya Janata Party
4	Raver	Raksha Khadse	Bharatiya Janata Party
5	Buldhana	Prataprao Ganpatrao Jadhav	Shiv Sena
6	Akola	Sanjay Shamrao Dhotre	Bharatiya Janata Party
7	Amravati (SC)	Balwant Wankhade	Indian National Congress
8	Wardha	Ramdas Tadas	Bharatiya Janata Party
9	Ramtek (SC)	Krupal Tumane	Shiv Sena
10	Nagpur	Nitin Gadkari	Bharatiya Janata Party
11	Bhandara–Gondiya	Sunil Baburao Mendhe	Bharatiya Janata Party
12	Gadchiroli–Chimur (ST)	Ashok Nete	Bharatiya Janata Party
13	Chandrapur	Suresh Dhanorkar (Died on 30 May 2023)	Indian National Congress
13	Chandrapur	Vacant	
14	Yavatmal–Washim	Bhavana Gawali	Shiv Sena
15	Hingoli	Hemant Patil	Shiv Sena
16	Nanded	Prataprao Govindrao Chikhalikar	Bharatiya Janata Party
17	Parbhani	Sanjay Haribhau Jadhav	Shiv Sena (Uddhav Balasaheb Thackeray)
18	Jalna	Raosaheb Danve	Bharatiya Janata Party
19	Aurangabad	Imtiyaz Jaleel	All India Majlis-e-Ittehadul Muslimeen
20	Dindori (ST)	Bharati Pawar	Bharatiya Janata Party
21	Nashik	Hemant Godse	Shiv Sena
22	Palghar (ST)	Rajendra Gavit	Shiv Sena
23	Bhiwandi	Kapil Patil	Bharatiya Janata Party
24	Kalyan	Shrikant Shinde	Shiv Sena
25	Thane	Rajan Vichare	Shiv Sena (Uddhav Balasaheb Thackeray)
26	Mumbai North	Gopal Shetty	Bharatiya Janata Party
27	Mumbai North West	Gajanan Kirtikar	Shiv Sena
28	Mumbai North East	Manoj Kotak	Bharatiya Janata Party
29	Mumbai North Central	Poonam Mahajan	Bharatiya Janata Party
30	Mumbai South Central	Rahul Shewale	Shiv Sena
31	Mumbai South	Arvind Sawant	Shiv Sena (Uddhav Balasaheb Thackeray)
32	Raigad	Sunil Tatkare	Nationalist Congress Party
33	Maval	Shrirang Barne	Shiv Sena
34	Pune	Girish Bapat (Died on 29 March 2023)	Bharatiya Janata Party
34	Pune	Vacant	
35	Baramati	Supriya Sule	Nationalist Congress Party (Sharadchandra Pawar)
36	Shirur	Amol Kolhe	Nationalist Congress Party (Sharadchandra Pawar)
37	Ahmednagar	Sujay Vikhe Patil	Bharatiya Janata Party
38	Shirdi (SC)	Sadashiv Lokhande	Shiv Sena
39	Beed	Pritam Munde	Bharatiya Janata Party
40	Osmanabad	Omprakash Rajenimbalkar	Shiv Sena (Uddhav Balasaheb Thackeray)
41	Latur (SC)	Sudhakar Tukaram Shrangare	Bharatiya Janata Party
42	Solapur (SC)	Jaisidhesvar Swami	Bharatiya Janata Party
43	Madha	Ranjit Naik-Nimbalkar	Bharatiya Janata Party
44	Sangli	Sanjay Ramchandra Patil	Bharatiya Janata Party
45	Satara	Udayanraje Bhosale (Resigned on 14 September 2019)	Nationalist Congress Party
45	Satara	Shriniwas Patil (Elected on 24 October 2019)	Nationalist Congress Party (Sharadchandra Pawar)
46	Ratnagiri–Sindhudurg	Vinayak Raut	Shiv Sena (Uddhav Balasaheb Thackeray)
47	Kolhapur	Sanjay Mandlik	Shiv Sena
48	Hatkanangle	Dhairyasheel Sambhajirao Mane	Shiv Sena

== Manipur ==
Manipur constituencies

Keys: BJP (1) NPF (1)

#	Constituency	Name	Party
1	Inner Manipur	Rajkumar Ranjan Singh	Bharatiya Janata Party
2	Outer Manipur (ST)	Lorho S. Pfoze	Naga People's Front

== Meghalaya ==
Keys: INC (1) NPP (1)

#	Constituency	Name	Party
1	Shillong (ST)	Vincent Pala	Indian National Congress
2	Tura (ST)	Agatha Sangma	National People's Party

== Mizoram ==
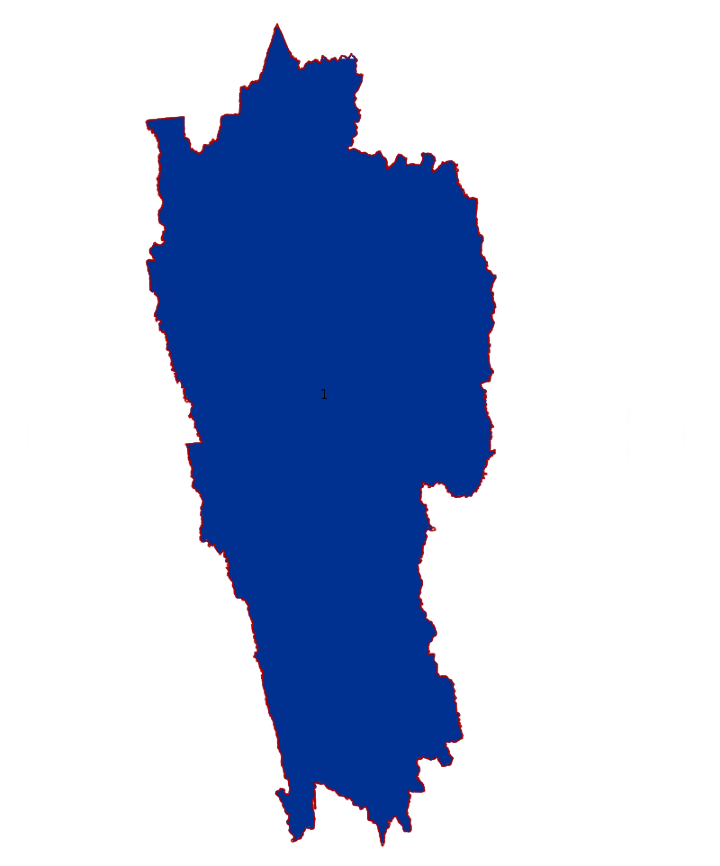
Mizoram constituency

Keys: MNF (1)

#	Constituency	Name	Party
1	Mizoram (ST)	C. Lalrosanga	Mizo National Front

== Nagaland ==
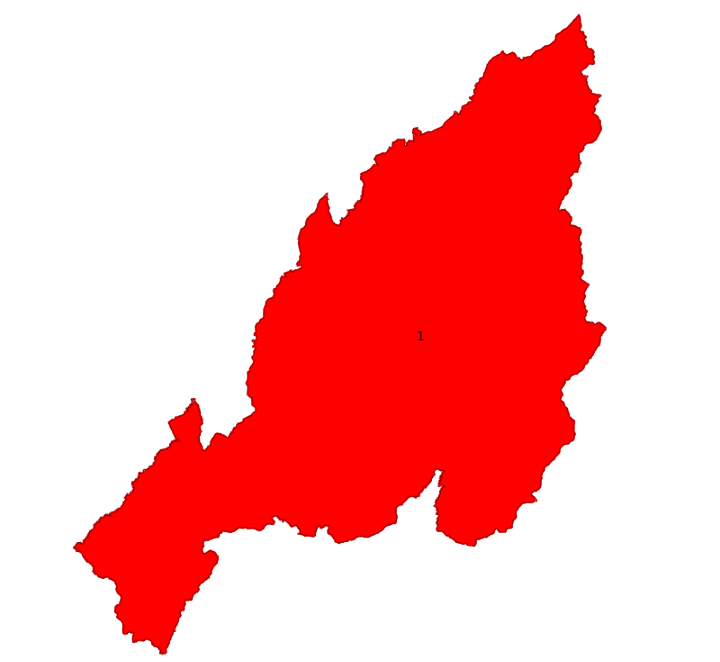
Nagaland constituency

Keys: NDPP (1)

#	Constituency	Name	Party
1	Nagaland	Tokheho Yepthomi	Nationalist Democratic Progressive Party

== Odisha ==
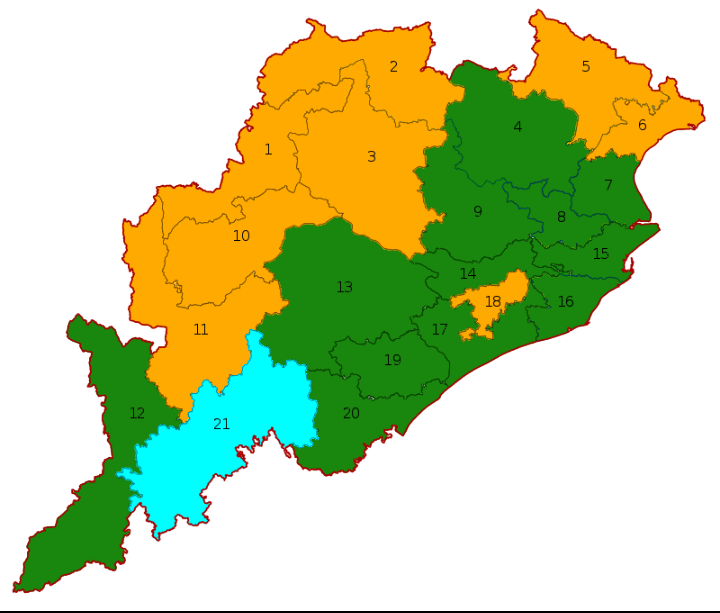
Odisha constituencies

Keys: BJD (12) BJP (8) INC (1)

#	Constituency	Name	Party
1	Bargarh	Suresh Pujari	Bharatiya Janata Party
2	Sundargarh (ST)	Jual Oram	Bharatiya Janata Party
3	Sambalpur	Nitesh Ganga Deb	Bharatiya Janata Party
4	Keonjhar (ST)	Chandrani Murmu	Biju Janata Dal
5	Mayurbhanj (ST)	Bishweswar Tudu	Bharatiya Janata Party
6	Balasore	Pratap Chandra Sarangi	Bharatiya Janata Party
7	Bhadrak (SC)	Manjulata Mandal	Biju Janata Dal
8	Jajpur (SC)	Sarmistha Sethi	Biju Janata Dal
9	Dhenkanal	Mahesh Sahoo	Biju Janata Dal
10	Bolangir	Sangeeta Kumari	Bharatiya Janata Party
11	Kalahandi	Basanta Kumar Panda	Bharatiya Janata Party
12	Nabarangpur (ST)	Ramesh Chandra Majhi	Biju Janata Dal
13	Kandhamal	Achyutananda Samanta	Biju Janata Dal
14	Cuttack	Bhartruhari Mahtab	Biju Janata Dal
15	Kendrapara	Anubhav Mohanty	Biju Janata Dal
16	Jagatsinghpur (SC)	Rajashree Mallick	Biju Janata Dal
17	Puri	Pinaki Mishra	Biju Janata Dal
18	Bhubaneswar	Aparajita Sarangi	Bharatiya Janata Party
19	Aska	Pramila Bisoyi	Biju Janata Dal
20	Berhampur	Chandra Sekhar Sahu	Biju Janata Dal
21	Koraput (ST)	Saptagiri Sankar Ulaka	Indian National Congress

== Punjab ==
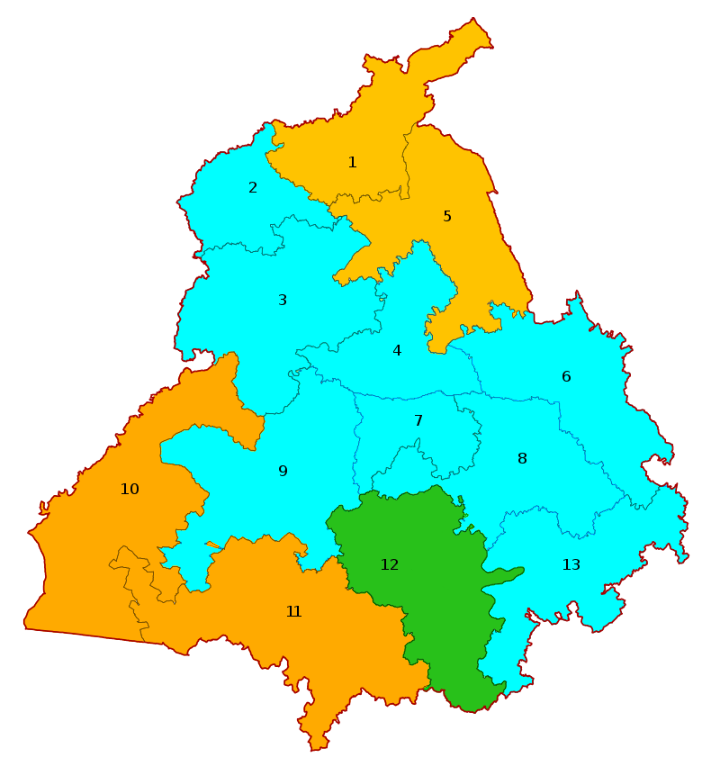
Punjab constituencies

Keys: INC (5) BJP (05) SAD (2) SAD(A) (1)

#	Constituency	Name	Party
1	Gurdaspur	Sunny Deol	Bharatiya Janata Party
2	Amritsar	Gurjeet Singh Aujla	Indian National Congress
3	Khadoor Sahib	Jasbir Singh Gill	Indian National Congress
4	Jalandhar	Santokh Singh Chaudhary (Died on 14 January 2023)	Indian National Congress
4	Jalandhar	Sushil Kumar Rinku (Elected on 13 May 2023)(Won on AAP ticket later joined BJP)	Bharatiya Janata Party
5	Hoshiarpur (SC)	Som Prakash	Bharatiya Janata Party
6	Anandpur Sahib	Manish Tewari	Indian National Congress
7	Ludhiana	Ravneet Singh Bittu (Won on INC ticket later joined BJP)	Bharatiya Janata Party
8	Fatehgarh Sahib (SC)	Amar Singh	Indian National Congress
9	Faridkot (SC)	Muhammad Sadiq	Indian National Congress
10	Firozpur	Sukhbir Singh Badal	Shiromani Akali Dal
11	Bathinda	Harsimrat Kaur Badal	Shiromani Akali Dal
12	Sangrur	Bhagwant Mann (Resigned on 14 March 2022)	Aam Aadmi Party
12	Sangrur	Simranjit Singh Mann (Elected on 26 June 2022)	Shiromani Akali Dal (Amritsar)
13	Patiala	Preneet Kaur (Won on INC ticket later joined BJP)	INC
13	Patiala	Preneet Kaur (Won on INC ticket later joined BJP)	BJP

== Rajasthan ==
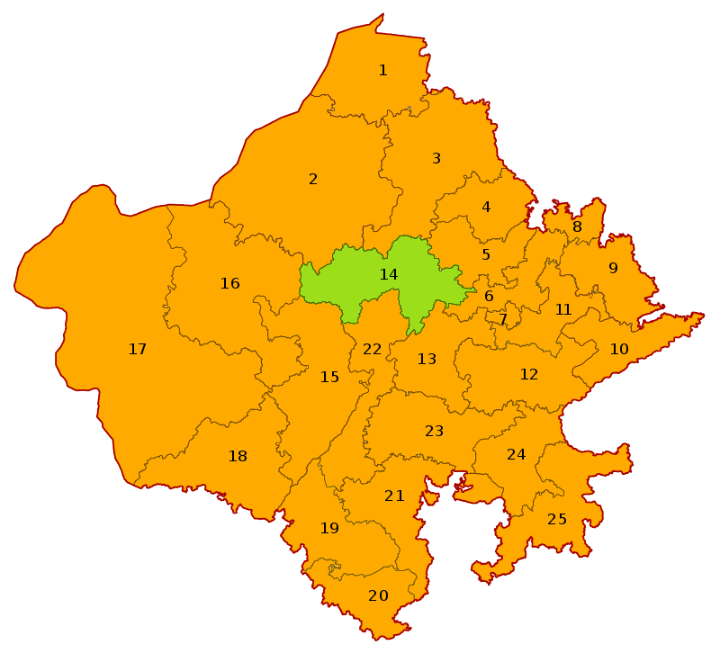
Rajasthan constituencies

Keys: BJP (20) INC (1) Vacant (4)

#	Constituency	Name	Party
1	Ganganagar (SC)	Nihal Chand Chauhan	Bharatiya Janata Party
2	Bikaner (SC)	Arjun Ram Meghwal	Bharatiya Janata Party
3	Churu	Rahul Kaswan (Won on BJP ticket but later joined INC)	Indian National Congress
4	Jhunjhunu	Narendra Kumar	Bharatiya Janata Party
5	Sikar	Sumedhanand Saraswati	Bharatiya Janata Party
6	Jaipur Rural	Rajyavardhan Singh Rathore (Resigned on 6 December 2023)	Bharatiya Janata Party
6	Jaipur Rural	Vacant	
7	Jaipur	Ramcharan Bohara	Bharatiya Janata Party
8	Alwar	Balak Nath (Resigned on 7 December 2023)	Bharatiya Janata Party
8	Alwar	Vacant	
9	Bharatpur (SC)	Ranjeeta Koli	Bharatiya Janata Party
10	Karauli–Dholpur (SC)	Manoj Rajoria	Bharatiya Janata Party
11	Dausa (ST)	Jaskaur Meena	Bharatiya Janata Party
12	Tonk–Sawai Madhopur	Sukhbir Singh Jaunapuria	Bharatiya Janata Party
13	Ajmer	Bhagirath Choudhary	Bharatiya Janata Party
14	Nagaur	Hanuman Beniwal (Resigned on 8 December 2023)	Rashtriya Loktantrik Party
14	Nagaur	Vacant	
15	Pali	P. P. Chaudhary	Bharatiya Janata Party
16	Jodhpur	Gajendra Singh Shekhawat	Bharatiya Janata Party
17	Barmer	Kailash Choudhary	Bharatiya Janata Party
18	Jalore	Devaji Patel	Bharatiya Janata Party
19	Udaipur (ST)	Arjun Lal Meena	Bharatiya Janata Party
20	Banswara (ST)	Kanak Mal Katara	Bharatiya Janata Party
21	Chittorgarh	Chandra Prakash Joshi	Bharatiya Janata Party
22	Rajsamand	Diya Kumari (Resigned on 6 December 2023)	Bharatiya Janata Party
22	Rajsamand	Vacant	
23	Bhilwara	Subhash Chandra Baheria	Bharatiya Janata Party
24	Kota	Om Birla	Bharatiya Janata Party
25	Jhalawar–Baran	Dushyant Singh	Bharatiya Janata Party

== Sikkim ==
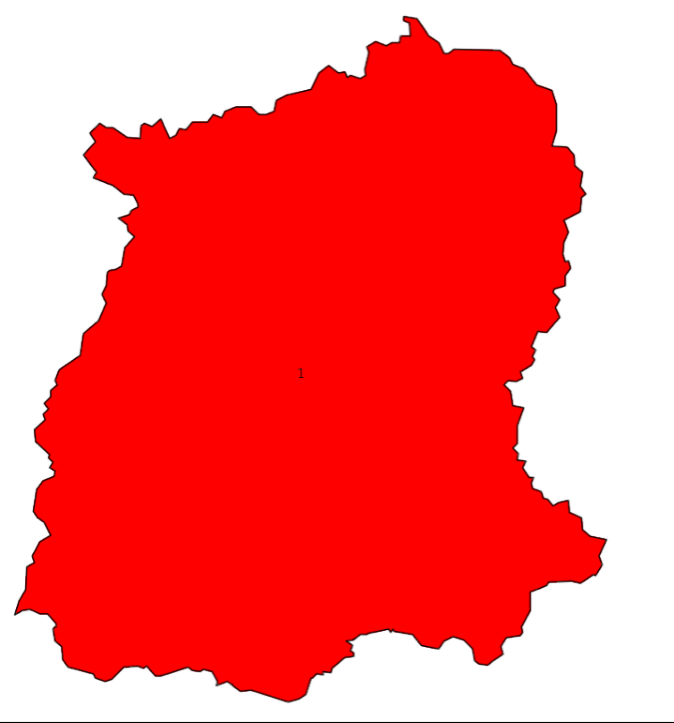
Sikkim constituency

Keys: SKM (1)

#	Constituency	Name	Party
1	Sikkim	Indra Hang Subba	Sikkim Krantikari Morcha

== Tamil Nadu ==
Keys: DMK (23) INC (8) CPI (2) CPI(M) (2) IUML (1) VCK (1) IND (1)

#	Constituency	Name	Party
1	Tiruvallur (SC)	K. Jeyakumar	Indian National Congress
2	Chennai North	Kalanidhi Veeraswamy	Dravida Munnetra Kazhagam
3	Chennai South	Thamizhachi Thangapandian	Dravida Munnetra Kazhagam
4	Chennai Central	Dayanidhi Maran	Dravida Munnetra Kazhagam
5	Sriperumbudur	T. R. Baalu	Dravida Munnetra Kazhagam
6	Kancheepuram (SC)	G. Selvam	Dravida Munnetra Kazhagam
7	Arakkonam	S. Jagathrakshakan	Dravida Munnetra Kazhagam
8	Vellore	D. M. Kathir Anand	Dravida Munnetra Kazhagam
9	Krishnagiri	A. Chellakumar	Indian National Congress
10	Dharmapuri	S. Senthil Kumar	Dravida Munnetra Kazhagam
11	Tiruvannamalai	C. N. Annadurai	Dravida Munnetra Kazhagam
12	Arani	M. K. Vishnu Prasad	Indian National Congress
13	Viluppuram (SC)	D. Ravikumar	Dravida Munnetra Kazhagam
14	Kallakurichi	Gautam Sigamani	Dravida Munnetra Kazhagam
15	Salem	S. R. Parthiban	Dravida Munnetra Kazhagam
16	Namakkal	A. K. P. Chinraj	Dravida Munnetra Kazhagam
17	Erode	A. Ganeshamurthi (Died on 28 March 2024)	Dravida Munnetra Kazhagam
17	Erode	Vacant	
18	Tiruppur	K. Subbarayan	Communist Party of India
19	Nilgiris (SC)	A. Raja	Dravida Munnetra Kazhagam
20	Coimbatore	P. R. Natarajan	Communist Party of India (Marxist)
21	Pollachi	K. Shamugasundaram	Dravida Munnetra Kazhagam
22	Dindigul	P. Veluchamy	Dravida Munnetra Kazhagam
23	Karur	Jothimani	Indian National Congress
24	Tiruchirappalli	Su. Thirunavukkarasar	Indian National Congress
25	Perambalur	T. R. Paarivendhar	Dravida Munnetra Kazhagam
26	Cuddalore	T. R. V. S. Ramesh	Dravida Munnetra Kazhagam
27	Chidambaram (SC)	Thol. Thirumavalavan	Viduthalai Chiruthaigal Katchi
28	Mayiladuthurai	S. Ramalingam	Dravida Munnetra Kazhagam
29	Nagapattinam (SC)	M. Selvarasu (Dead on 13 May 2024)	Communist Party of India
29	Nagapattinam (SC)	Vacant	
30	Thanjavur	S. S. Palanimanickam	Dravida Munnetra Kazhagam
31	Sivaganga	Karti Chidambaram	Indian National Congress
32	Madurai	S. Venkatesan	Communist Party of India (Marxist)
33	Theni	P. Ravindhranath	Independent
34	Virudhunagar	Manickam Tagore	Indian National Congress
35	Ramanathapuram	Navaskani	Indian Union Muslim League
36	Thoothukkudi	Kanimozhi Karunanidhi	Dravida Munnetra Kazhagam
37	Tenkasi (SC)	Dhanush M. Kumar	Dravida Munnetra Kazhagam
38	Tirunelveli	S. Gnanathiraviam	Dravida Munnetra Kazhagam
39	Kanniyakumari	H. Vasanthakumar (Died on 28 August 2020)	Indian National Congress
39	Kanniyakumari	Vijay Vasanth (Elected on 2 May 2021)	Indian National Congress

== Telangana ==
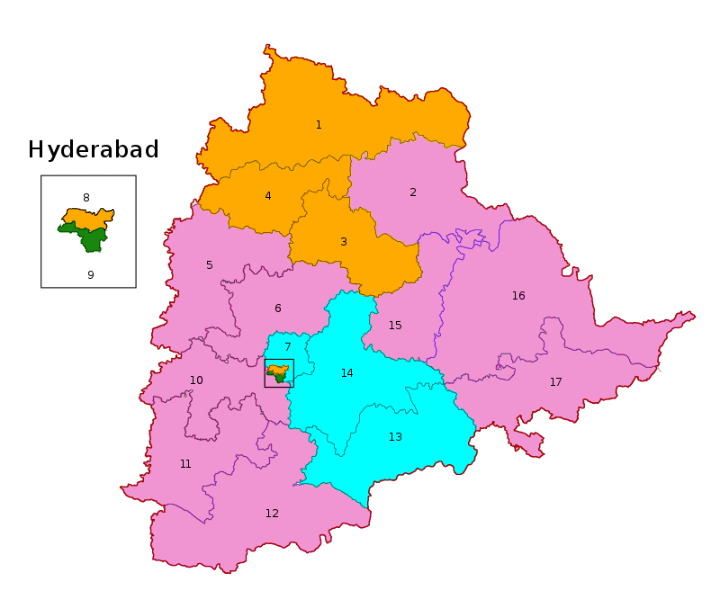
Telangana constituencies

Keys: BJP (6) INC (3) BRS (3) AIMIM (1) Vacant (4)

#	Constituency	Name	Party
1	Adilabad (ST)	Soyam Bapu Rao	Bharatiya Janata Party
2	Peddapalli (SC)	Venkatesh Netha Borlakunta (Switched from BRS to INC)	Bharat Rashtra Samithi
2	Peddapalli (SC)	Venkatesh Netha Borlakunta (Switched from BRS to INC)	Indian National Congress
3	Karimnagar	Bandi Sanjay Kumar	Bharatiya Janata Party
4	Nizamabad	Dharmapuri Arvind	Bharatiya Janata Party
5	Zahirabad	B. B. Patil (Switched from BRS to BJP)	Bharat Rashtra Samithi
5	Zahirabad	B. B. Patil (Switched from BRS to BJP)	Bharatiya Janata Party
6	Medak	Kotha Prabhakar Reddy (Resigned on 13 December 2023)	Bharat Rashtra Samithi
6	Medak	Vacant	
7	Malkajgiri	A. Revanth Reddy (Resigned on 8 December 2023)	Indian National Congress
7	Malkajgiri	Vacant	
8	Secunderabad	G. Kishan Reddy	Bharatiya Janata Party
9	Hyderabad	Asaduddin Owaisi	All India Majlis-e-Ittehadul Muslimeen
10	Chevella	G. Ranjith Reddy(Switched from BRS to INC)	Bharat Rashtra Samithi
10	Chevella	G. Ranjith Reddy(Switched from BRS to INC)	Indian National Congress
11	Mahabubnagar	Manne Srinivas Reddy	Bharat Rashtra Samithi
12	Nagarkurnool (SC)	Pothuganti Ramulu (Switched from BRS to BJP)	Bharat Rashtra Samithi
12	Nagarkurnool (SC)	Pothuganti Ramulu (Switched from BRS to BJP)	Bharatiya Janata Party
13	Nalgonda	N. Uttam Kumar Reddy (Resigned on 6 December 2023)	Indian National Congress
13	Nalgonda	Vacant	
14	Bhongir	Komatireddy Venkat Reddy (Resigned on 8 December 2023)	Indian National Congress
14	Bhongir	Vacant	
15	Warangal (SC)	Pasunuri Dayakar(Switched from BRS to INC)	Bharat Rashtra Samithi
15	Warangal (SC)	Pasunuri Dayakar(Switched from BRS to INC)	Indian National Congress
16	Mahabubabad (ST)	Kavitha Maloth	Bharat Rashtra Samithi
17	Khammam	Nama Nageswara Rao	Bharat Rashtra Samithi

== Tripura ==
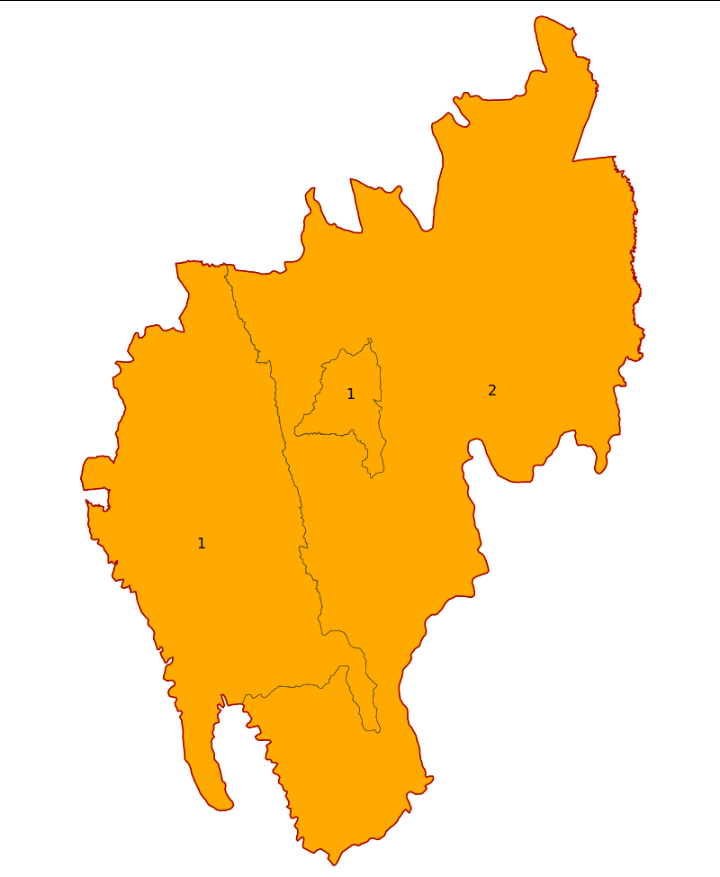
Tripura constituencies

Keys: BJP (2)

#	Constituency	Name	Party
1	Tripura West	Pratima Bhoumik	Bharatiya Janata Party
2	Tripura East (ST)	Rebati Tripura	Bharatiya Janata Party

== Uttar Pradesh ==
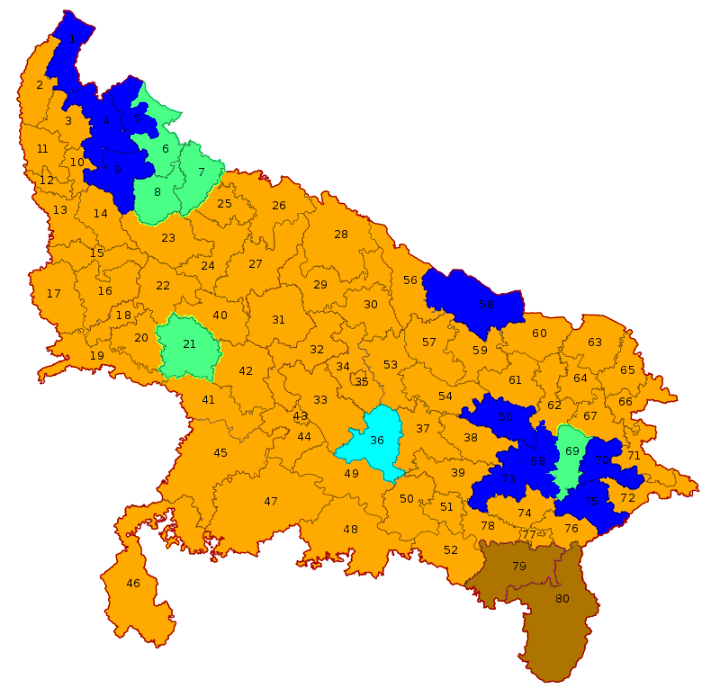
Uttar Pradesh constituencies

Keys: BJP (66) BSP (6) SP (2) AD(S) (2) INC (2) Vacant (2)

#	Constituency	Name	Party
1	Saharanpur	Haji Fazlur Rehman	Bahujan Samaj Party
2	Kairana	Pradeep Kumar Choudhary	Bharatiya Janata Party
3	Muzaffarnagar	Sanjeev Kumar Balyan	Bharatiya Janata Party
4	Bijnor	Malook Nagar	Bahujan Samaj Party
5	Nagina (SC)	Girish Chandra	Bahujan Samaj Party
6	Moradabad	S. T. Hasan	Samajwadi Party
7	Rampur	Azam Khan (Resigned on 22 March 2022)	Samajwadi Party
7	Rampur	Ghanshyam Singh Lodhi (Elected on 26 June 2022)	Bharatiya Janata Party
8	Sambhal	Shafiqur Rehman Barq (Died on 27 February 2024)	Samajwadi Party
8	Sambhal	Vacant	
9	Amroha	Kunwar Danish Ali (Won on BSP ticket but later joined INC	Indian National Congress
10	Meerut	Rajendra Agrawal	Bharatiya Janata Party
11	Baghpat	Satya Pal Singh	Bharatiya Janata Party
12	Ghaziabad	V. K. Singh	Bharatiya Janata Party
13	Gautam Buddh Nagar	Mahesh Sharma	Bharatiya Janata Party
14	Bulandshahr (SC)	Bhola Singh	Bharatiya Janata Party
15	Aligarh	Satish Kumar Gautam	Bharatiya Janata Party
16	Hathras (SC)	Rajvir Singh Diler	Bharatiya Janata Party
17	Mathura	Hema Malini	Bharatiya Janata Party
18	Agra (SC)	Satya Pal Singh Baghel	Bharatiya Janata Party
19	Fatehpur Sikri	Rajkumar Chahar	Bharatiya Janata Party
20	Firozabad	Chandrasen Jadon	Bharatiya Janata Party
21	Mainpuri	Mulayam Singh Yadav (Died on 10 October 2022)	Samajwadi Party
21	Mainpuri	Dimple Yadav (Elected on 8 December 2022)	Samajwadi Party
22	Etah	Rajveer Singh	Bharatiya Janata Party
23	Badaun	Sanghmitra Maurya	Bharatiya Janata Party
24	Aonla	Dharmendra Kashyap	Bharatiya Janata Party
25	Bareilly	Santosh Gangwar	Bharatiya Janata Party
26	Pilibhit	Varun Gandhi	Bharatiya Janata Party
27	Shahjahanpur (SC)	Arun Kumar Sagar	Bharatiya Janata Party
28	Kheri	Ajay Kumar Mishra	Bharatiya Janata Party
29	Dhaurahra	Rekha Verma	Bharatiya Janata Party
30	Sitapur	Rajesh Verma	Bharatiya Janata Party
31	Hardoi (SC)	Jai Prakash Rawat	Bharatiya Janata Party
32	Misrikh (SC)	Ashok Kumar Rawat	Bharatiya Janata Party
33	Unnao	Sakshi Maharaj	Bharatiya Janata Party
34	Mohanlalganj (SC)	Kaushal Kishore	Bharatiya Janata Party
35	Lucknow	Rajnath Singh	Bharatiya Janata Party
36	Rae Bareli	Sonia Gandhi	Indian National Congress
37	Amethi	Smriti Irani	Bharatiya Janata Party
38	Sultanpur	Maneka Gandhi	Bharatiya Janata Party
39	Pratapgarh	Sangam Lal Gupta	Bharatiya Janata Party
40	Farrukhabad	Mukesh Rajput	Bharatiya Janata Party
41	Etawah (SC)	Ram Shankar Katheria	Bharatiya Janata Party
42	Kannauj	Subrat Pathak	Bharatiya Janata Party
43	Kanpur	Satyadev Pachauri	Bharatiya Janata Party
44	Akbarpur	Devendra Singh Bhole	Bharatiya Janata Party
45	Jalaun (SC)	Bhanu Pratap Singh Verma	Bharatiya Janata Party
46	Jhansi	Anurag Sharma	Bharatiya Janata Party
47	Hamirpur	Pushpendra Singh Chandel	Bharatiya Janata Party
48	Banda	R. K. Singh Patel	Bharatiya Janata Party
49	Fatehpur	Niranjan Jyoti	Bharatiya Janata Party
50	Kaushambi (SC)	Vinod Sonkar	Bharatiya Janata Party
51	Phulpur	Keshari Devi Patel	Bharatiya Janata Party
52	Allahabad	Rita Bahuguna Joshi	Bharatiya Janata Party
53	Barabanki (SC)	Upendra Singh Rawat	Bharatiya Janata Party
54	Faizabad	Lallu Singh	Bharatiya Janata Party
55	Ambedkar Nagar	Ritesh Pandey(Switched from BSP to BJP)	Bharatiya Janata Party
56	Bahraich (SC)	Akshaibar Lal	Bharatiya Janata Party
57	Kaiserganj	Brij Bhushan Sharan Singh	Bharatiya Janata Party
58	Shravasti	Ram Shiromani Verma	Bahujan Samaj Party
59	Gonda	Kirti Vardhan Singh	Bharatiya Janata Party
60	Domariyaganj	Jagdambika Pal	Bharatiya Janata Party
61	Basti	Harish Dwivedi	Bharatiya Janata Party
62	Sant Kabir Nagar	Praveen Kumar Nishad	Bharatiya Janata Party
63	Maharajganj	Pankaj Choudhary	Bharatiya Janata Party
64	Gorakhpur	Ravi Kishan	Bharatiya Janata Party
65	Kushinagar	Vijay Kumar Dubey	Bharatiya Janata Party
66	Deoria	Ramapati Ram Tripathi	Bharatiya Janata Party
67	Bansgaon (SC)	Kamlesh Paswan	Bharatiya Janata Party
68	Lalganj (SC)	Sangeeta Azad(Switched from BSP to BJP)	Bharatiya Janata Party
69	Azamgarh	Akhilesh Yadav (Resigned on 22 March 2022)	Samajwadi Party
69	Azamgarh	Dinesh Lal Yadav Nirahua (Elected on 26 June 2022)	Bharatiya Janata Party
70	Ghosi	Atul Rai	Bahujan Samaj Party
71	Salempur	Ravindra Kushawaha	Bharatiya Janata Party
72	Ballia	Virendra Singh Mast	Bharatiya Janata Party
73	Jaunpur	Shyam Singh Yadav	Bahujan Samaj Party
74	Machhlishahr (SC)	B. P. Saroj	Bharatiya Janata Party
75	Ghazipur	Afzal Ansari (disqualified on 1 May 2023)	Bahujan Samaj Party
75	Ghazipur	Vacant	
76	Chandauli	Mahendra Nath Pandey	Bharatiya Janata Party
77	Varanasi	Narendra Modi	Bharatiya Janata Party
78	Bhadohi	Ramesh Chand Bind	Bharatiya Janata Party
79	Mirzapur	Anupriya Patel	Apna Dal (Sonelal)
80	Robertsganj (SC)	Pakaudi Lal Kol	Apna Dal (Sonelal)

== Uttarakhand ==
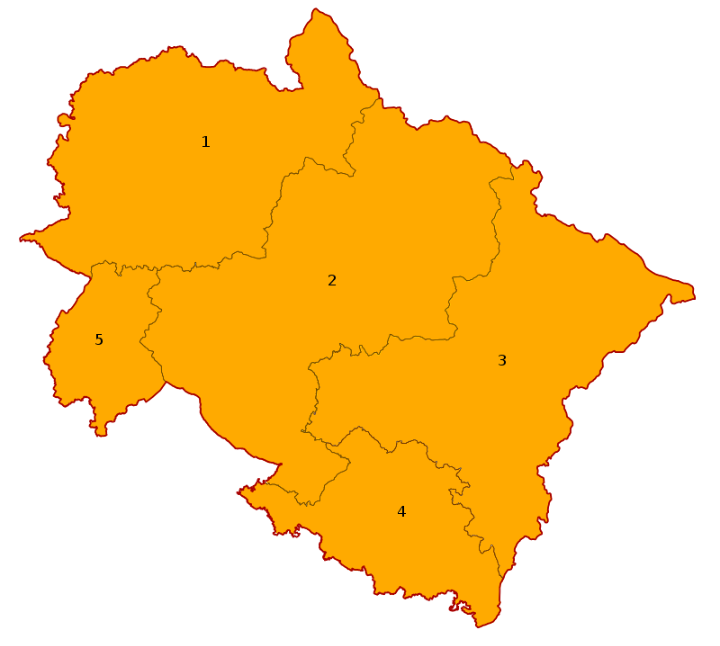
Uttarakhand constituencies

Keys: BJP (5)

#	Constituency	Name	Party
1	Tehri Garhwal	Mala Rajya Laxmi Shah	Bharatiya Janata Party
2	Garhwal	Tirath Singh Rawat	Bharatiya Janata Party
3	Almora (SC)	Ajay Tamta	Bharatiya Janata Party
4	Nainital–Udhamsingh Nagar	Ajay Bhatt	Bharatiya Janata Party
5	Haridwar	Ramesh Pokhriyal	Bharatiya Janata Party

== West Bengal ==
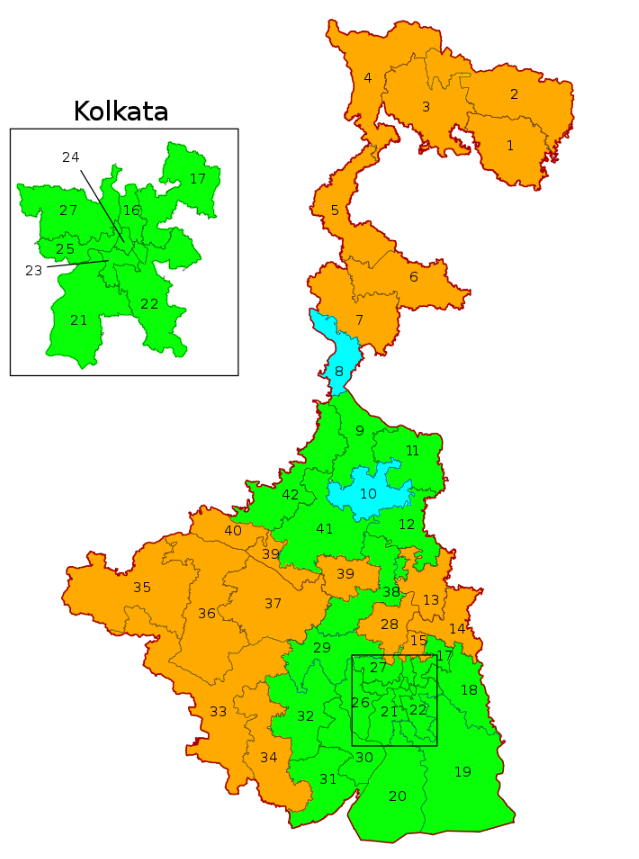
West Bengal constituencies

Keys: AITC (20) BJP (18) INC (2) Vacant (2)

#	Constituency	Name	Party
1	Cooch Behar (SC)	Nisith Pramanik	Bharatiya Janata Party
2	Alipurduars (ST)	John Barla	Bharatiya Janata Party
3	Jalpaiguri (SC)	Jayanta Kumar Roy	Bharatiya Janata Party
4	Darjeeling	Raju Bista	Bharatiya Janata Party
5	Raiganj	Debasree Chaudhuri	Bharatiya Janata Party
6	Balurghat	Sukanta Majumdar	Bharatiya Janata Party
7	Maldaha Uttar	Khagen Murmu	Bharatiya Janata Party
8	Maldaha Dakshin	Abu Hasem Khan Choudhury	Indian National Congress
9	Jangipur	Khalilur Rahaman	Trinamool Congress
10	Baharampur	Adhir Ranjan Chowdhury	Indian National Congress
11	Murshidabad	Abu Taher Khan	Trinamool Congress
12	Krishnanagar	Mahua Moitra (disqualified on 8 December 2023)	Trinamool Congress
12	Krishnanagar	Vacant	
13	Ranaghat (SC)	Jagannath Sarkar	Bharatiya Janata Party
14	Bongaon (SC)	Shantanu Thakur	Bharatiya Janata Party
15	Barrackpore	Arjun singh (Won on BJP ticket. Later joined AITC in 2022.Later he rejoined BJP in 2024)	Bharatiya Janata Party
16	Dum Dum	Saugata Roy	Trinamool Congress
17	Barasat	Kakoli Ghosh Dastidar	Trinamool Congress
18	Basirhat	Nusrat Jahan	Trinamool Congress
19	Jaynagar (SC)	Pratima Mondal	Trinamool Congress
20	Mathurapur (SC)	Choudhury Mohan Jatua	Trinamool Congress
21	Diamond Harbour	Abhishek Banerjee	Trinamool Congress
22	Jadavpur	Mimi Chakraborty (Resigned on 15 February 2024)	Trinamool Congress
22	Jadavpur	Vacant	
23	Kolkata Dakshin	Mala Roy	Trinamool Congress
24	Kolkata Uttar	Sudip Bandyopadhyay	Trinamool Congress
25	Howrah	Prasun Banerjee	Trinamool Congress
26	Uluberia	Sajda Ahmed	Trinamool Congress
27	Serampore	Kalyan Banerjee	Trinamool Congress
28	Hooghly	Locket Chatterjee	Bharatiya Janata Party
29	Arambagh (SC)	Aparupa Poddar (Afrin Ali)	Trinamool Congress
30	Tamluk	Dibyendu Adhikari	Bharatiya Janata Party
31	Kanthi	Sisir Adhikari	Bharatiya Janata Party
32	Ghatal	Deepak Adhikari (Dev)	Trinamool Congress
33	Jhargram (ST)	Kunar Hembram	Trinamool Congress
34	Medinipur	Dilip Ghosh	Bharatiya Janata Party
35	Purulia	Jyotirmay Singh Mahato	Bharatiya Janata Party
36	Bankura	Subhas Sarkar	Bharatiya Janata Party
37	Bishnupur (SC)	Saumitra Khan	Bharatiya Janata Party
38	Bardhaman Purba (SC)	Sunil Kumar Mandal	Trinamool Congress
39	Bardhaman–Durgapur	S. S. Ahluwalia	Bharatiya Janata Party
40	Asansol	Babul Supriyo (Resigned on 22 October 2021) ( Won from BJP ticket but later joined AITC)	Bharatiya Janata Party
40	Asansol	Shatrughan Sinha (Elected on 16 April 2022)	Trinamool Congress
41	Bolpur (SC)	Asit Kumar Mal	Trinamool Congress
42	Birbhum	Satabdi Roy	Trinamool Congress

== Andaman and Nicobar Islands ==
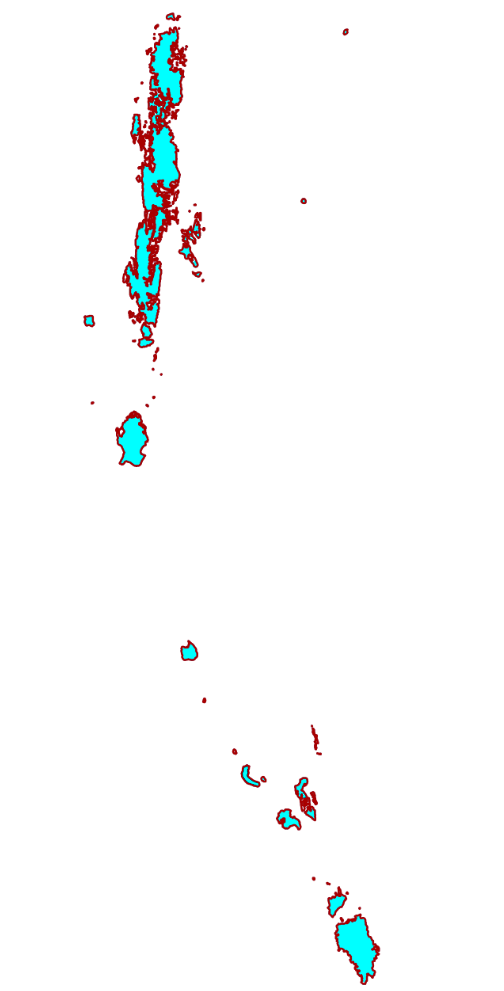
Andaman & Nicober Islands constituency

Keys: INC (1)

#	Constituency	Name	Party
1	Andaman and Nicobar Islands	Kuldeep Rai Sharma	Indian National Congress

== Chandigarh ==
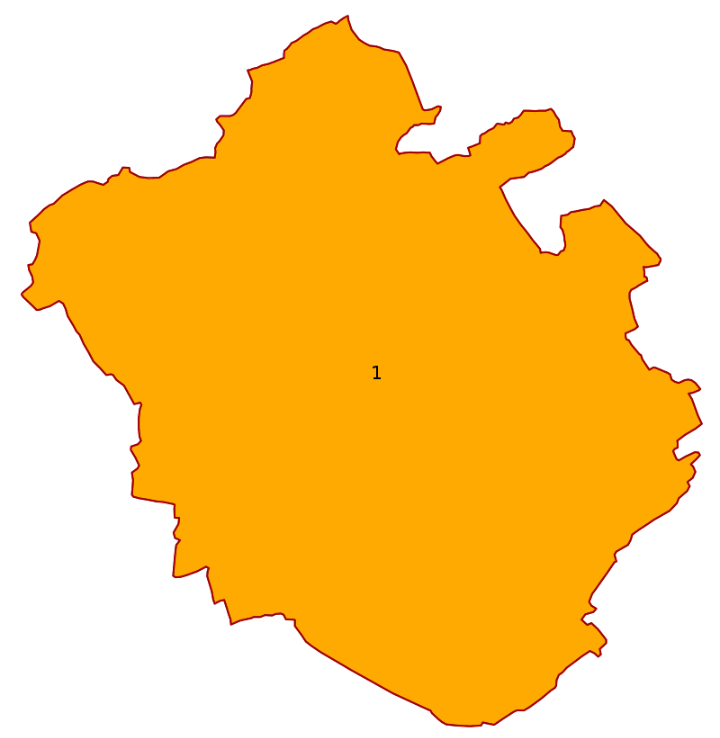

Keys: BJP (1)

#	Constituency	Name	Party
1	Chandigarh	Kirron Kher	Bharatiya Janata Party

== Dadra and Nagar Haveli and Daman and Diu ==
Keys: BJP (2)

#	Constituency	Name	Party
1	Dadra and Nagar Haveli (ST)	Mohanbhai Sanjibhai Delkar (Died on 22 February 2021)	Independent
1	Dadra and Nagar Haveli (ST)	Kalaben Delkar (Elected on 2 November 2021) (Switched from SSUBT to BJP)	Bharatiya Janata Party
2	Daman and Diu	Lalubhai Patel	Bharatiya Janata Party

== Jammu and Kashmir ==
Keys: JKNC (3) BJP (2)

#	Constituency	Name	Party
1	Baramulla	Mohammad Akbar Lone	Jammu & Kashmir National Conference
2	Srinagar	Farooq Abdullah	Jammu & Kashmir National Conference
3	Anantnag	Hasnain Masoodi	Jammu & Kashmir National Conference
4	Udhampur	Jitendra Singh	Bharatiya Janata Party
5	Jammu	Jugal Kishore Sharma	Bharatiya Janata Party

== Ladakh ==
Keys: BJP (1)

#	Constituency	Name	Party
1	Ladakh	Jamyang Tsering Namgyal	Bharatiya Janata Party

== Lakshadweep ==
Keys: NCP-SP (1)

#	Constituency	Name	Party
1	Lakshadweep(ST)	Mohammed Faizal Padippura	Nationalist Congress Party (Sharadchandra Pawar)

== NCT of Delhi ==
Keys: BJP (7)

#	Constituency	Name	Party
1	Chandni Chowk	Harsh Vardhan	Bharatiya Janata Party
2	North East Delhi	Manoj Tiwari	Bharatiya Janata Party
3	East Delhi	Gautam Gambhir	Bharatiya Janata Party
4	New Delhi	Meenakshi Lekhi	Bharatiya Janata Party
5	North West Delhi (SC)	Hans Raj Hans	Bharatiya Janata Party
6	West Delhi	Parvesh Verma	Bharatiya Janata Party
7	South Delhi	Ramesh Bidhuri	Bharatiya Janata Party

== Puducherry ==
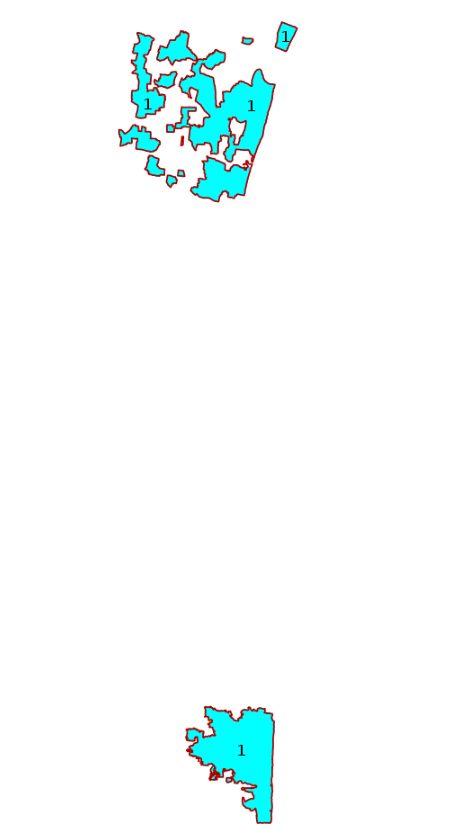
Puducherry constituencies

Keys: INC (1)

#	Constituency	Name	Party
1	Puducherry	V. Vaithilingam	Indian National Congress

== See also ==
- List of current members of the Rajya Sabha, the Upper House of Parliament of India
- List of members of current Lok Sabha
- List of constituencies of the Lok Sabha
- Member of Parliament, Lok Sabha
- List of members of the 16th Lok Sabha
- List of members of the 18th Lok Sabha
