= Krishna Murari Sharan =

Indian politician

Bihar Legislative Assembly
- Incumbent
- Assumed office 2020
- Preceded by: Shakti Singh Yadav
- Constituency: Hilsa

Personal details
- Party: JD(U)
- Occupation: Politics

Krishna Murari Sharan is an Indian politician from Bihar and a Member of the Bihar Legislative Assembly. Sharan won the Hilsa Assembly constituency on JD(U) ticket in the 2020 Bihar Legislative Assembly election.
