= Ramvriksh Sada =

Indian politician

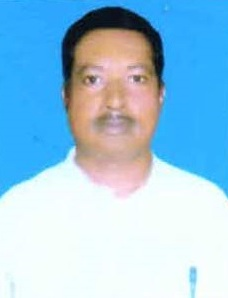

Bihar Legislative Assembly
- Preceded by: Chandan Kumar
- Succeeded by: Ram Chandra Sada
- Constituency: Alauli

Personal details
- Party: RJD
- Occupation: Politics

Ramvriksh Sada is an Indian politician from Bihar and a Member of the Bihar Legislative Assembly. Sada won the Alauli Assembly constituency on the RJD ticket in the 2020 Bihar Legislative Assembly election.

== Life and political career ==
Sada has been associated with Rashtriya Janata Dal for thirty years. In the election petition filed before Election Commission of India, he declared his asset worth ₹ 70,000. He was identified as the poorest Member of Bihar Legislative Assembly in 2020 elections. A father of five sons and one daughter, he was given ticket to contest from the Rashtriya Janata Dal, three times and in the third attempt, he was elected from the Alauli constituency, Khagaria.

He identifies himself as belonging to Musahar caste. In his election affidavit, he mentions his educational qualification to be matriculation level.
