= Ram Chandra Sada =

Indian politician

Member of Bihar Legislative Assembly
- Incumbent
- Assumed office 2025
- Preceded by: Ramvriksh Sada
- Constituency: Alauli
- In office 2010–2015
- Preceded by: Pashupati Kumar Paras
- Succeeded by: Chandan Kumar
- Constituency: Alauli

Personal details
- Party: Janata Dal (United)

Ram Chandra Sada is an Indian politician from Bihar and a Member of the Bihar Legislative Assembly. Sada won the Alauli Assembly constituency contesting from the JDU party in the 2010 and 2025 Bihar Legislative Assembly election.
