= Alauli Assembly constituency =

Coordinates: 25°38′30″N 86°24′05″E

- Constituency No. 148 for the Bihar Legislative Assembly

Constituency details
- Country: India
- Region: East India
- State: Bihar
- Division: Munger
- District: Khagaria
- Lok Sabha constituency: Khagaria
- Established: 1962
- Total electors: 266,664

Member of Legislative Assembly
- 18th Bihar Legislative Assembly
- Incumbent Ram Chandra Sada
- Party: JD(U)
- Alliance: NDA
- Elected year: 2025
- Preceded by: Ramvriksh Sada, RJD

Alauli is an Assembly Constituency in Khagaria district in the Indian state of Bihar. The seat is reserved for scheduled castes and previously has been part of Munger subdivision after independence. Alauli is a Nagar Panchayat from December 2020. There are 12 wards in Alauli Nagar Panchayat. Jayanti Shekhar became the first chairman of this town. Chini Lal Mandal became the first deputy chairman of this town.

== Overview ==
The constituency comprises the Alauli community development blocks Baraiy, Rani Larhi, Goriyami, Haripur, Roun, Saharbanni, Bhikharighat, Bahadurpur, Budhaura, Sonihar, Sumbha, Sakar-Pura, Belasimri, Olapur Gangour, Tetarabad, Jalkoura, Janhagira and Dhusmuri Bishanpur gram panchayats of Khagaria CD Block.

Alauli Assembly constituency is part of No. 25 Khagaria (Lok Sabha constituency).

== Members of the Legislative Assembly ==
Year	Member	Party
1962	Mishri Sada	Indian National Congress
1967	Mishri Sada	Indian National Congress
1969	Ram Vilas Paswan	Samyukta Socialist Party
1972	Mishri Sada	Indian National Congress
1977	Pashupati Kumar Paras	Janata Party
1980	Mishri Sada	Indian National Congress
1985	Pashupati Kumar Paras	Lokdal
1990	Pashupati Kumar Paras	Janata Dal
1995	Pashupati Kumar Paras	Janata Dal
2000	Pashupati Kumar Paras	Janata Dal (United)
2005	Pashupati Kumar Paras	Lok Janshakti Party
2005	Pashupati Kumar Paras	Lok Janshakti Party
2010	Ram Chandra Sada	Janata Dal (United)
2015	Chandan Kumar	Rashtriya Janata Dal
2020	Ramvriksh Sada	Rashtriya Janata Dal
2025	Ram Chandra Sada	Janata Dal

== Election results ==
=== 2025 ===
Bihar Legislative Assembly Election, 2025: Alauli
Party	Candidate	Votes	%	±%
JD(U)	Ram Chandra Sada	93,208	51.94	+21.17
RJD	Ramvriksh Sada	57,476	32.03	−0.66
RLJP	Yash Raj Paswan	14,261	7.95	
JSP	Abhishek Kumar	7,476	4.17	
BSP	Dasharath Ram	3,073	1.71	+0.4
NOTA	None of the above	3,953	2.2	+0.28
Majority		35,732	19.91	+17.99
Turnout		179,447	67.29	+10.21
JD(U) hold		Swing		

=== 2020 ===
Bihar Assembly election, 2020: Alauli Assembly constituency
Party	Candidate	Votes	%	±%
RJD	Ramvriksh Sada	47,183	32.69	−18.88
JD(U)	Sadhna Devi	44,410	30.77	
LJP	Ram Chandra Sada	26,386	18.28	−15.39
JAP(L)	Bodhan Sada	5,614	3.89	
Independent	Rajesh Kumar Sada	5,353	3.71	
Independent	Nilam Devi	2,866	1.99	
Independent	Wakil Paswan	2,348	1.63	
BSP	Jagnandan Sada	1,894	1.31	
NOTA	None of the above	2,767	1.92	−0.89
Majority		2,773	1.92	−15.98
Turnout		144,350	57.08	−2.63
RJD hold		Swing		

=== 2015 ===
Bihar Assembly election, 2015: Alauli
Party	Candidate	Votes	%	±%
RJD	Chandan Kumar	70,519	51.57	
LJP	Pashupati Kumar Paras	46,049	33.67	
CPI	Manoj Sada	7,087	5.18	
Independent	Ram Prasad Sada	4,335	3.17	
Independent	Phuleshwar Sada	1,813	1.33	
NOTA	None of the above	3,843	2.81	
Majority		24,470	17.9	
Turnout		136,755	59.71	
