= Baiju Prasad =

Indian politician

Member of Bihar Legislative Assembly
- In office 1995–2000
- Preceded by: Kishnadeo Singh Yadav
- Succeeded by: Ramcharitra Prasad Singh
- Constituency: Hilsa

Personal details
- Party: Rashtriya Janata Dal; Janata Dal
- Occupation: Politician social work

Baiju Prasad is an Indian politician who was elected as a member of Bihar Legislative Assembly from Hilsa constituency in 1995 as a member of Janata Dal.

== Political life ==
Prasad contested in 2000 as a member of Rashtriya Janata Dal but lost to Ramcharitra Prasad Singh of Samata Party.

== See also ==
- Hilsa Assembly constituency
