= Kishnadeo Singh Yadav =

Indian politician

Member of Bihar Legislative Assembly
- In office 1990–1995
- Preceded by: Surendra Prasad
- Succeeded by: Baiju Prasad
- Constituency: Hilsa

Personal details
- Party: Indian People's Front Now (CPIML)
- Occupation: Politician social work

Kishnadeo Singh Yadav also known as K D Yadav is an Indian politician who was elected as a member of Bihar Legislative Assembly from Hilsa constituency in 1990 as a member of Indian People's Front.

== See also ==
- Hilsa Assembly constituency
