= Rashtriya Lok Janshakti Party =

Indian political party

Rashtriya Lok Janshakti Party President : PK Paras
- Abbreviation: RLJP
- President: Pashupati Kumar Paras
- Founder: Pashupati Kumar Paras
- Founded: 5 October 2021 (4 years ago)
- Split from: Lok Janshakti Party
- Student wing: Chhatra RLJP
- Colours: Green
- ECI Status: Recognised
- Alliance: NDA (2021–2025)
- Seats in Bihar Legislative Council: 1 / 75

Election symbol
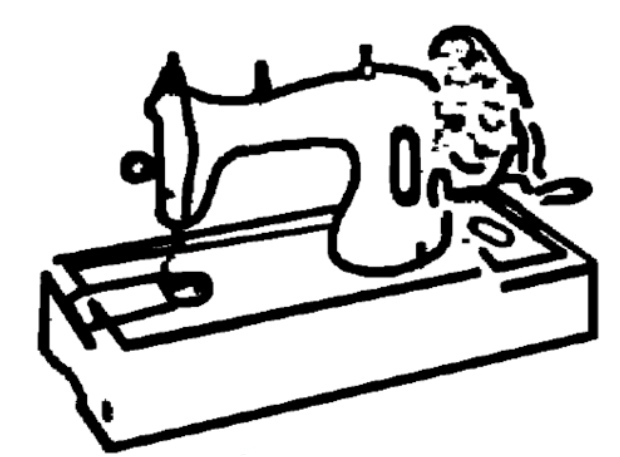

Rashtriya Lok Janshakti Party (abbreviated as RLJP; translation: National People's Manpower Party) is an Indian state-level political party in Bihar, India. political party formed in October 2021 under the leadership of Pashupati Kumar Paras. It was previously part of the unified Lok Janshakti Party, before the LJP fractured into two parts; the other faction forming the Lok Janshakti Party (Ram Vilas). The party (led by Pashupati Paras) became a part of the NDA in 2024, leaving the alliance in 2025.

The party contested the 2022 Manipur Legislative Assembly election but failed to win any seats.

Bhushan Rai, candidate of Rashtriya Lok Janshakti Party, won the MLC seat from Vaishali in 2022.

The party contested the 2025 Bihar Legislative Assembly election but failed to win any seats.

== Electoral Performance ==
=== Bihar Assembly Elections ===
Election	Lok sabha	Party leader	Seats contested	Seats won / Seats Contested	Overall vote %	Vote swing	Ref.
2025	17th Assembly	Pashupati Kumar Paras	25	0 / 25	0.17%	New entry	

== List of Candidates and Performance in 2025 Bihar Assembly Elections ==
AC No.	AC Name	Candidate name	Gender	Age	Total Votes	Vote %
148	Alauli (SC)	Yash Raj	Male	25	14,261	7.95
205	Bhabua	Vikash Kumar Tiwari	Male	46	6,244	3.24
150	Beldaur	Sunita Sharma	Female	49	4,978	2.29
132	Warisnagar	Govind Kumar	Male	43	4,178	1.78
67	Manihari (ST)	Ram Ratan Prasad	Male	48	3,761	1.58
243	Chakai	Allaudin Ansari	Male	43	3,667	1.57
129	Mahnar	Achutanand	Male	67	2,554	1.27
147	Bakhri (SC)	Nira Devi	Female	39	2,450	1.19
162	Katoria (ST)	Shiv Lal Hansda	Male	57	2,257	1.15
235	Rajauli (SC)	Pratima Kumari	Female	30	2,262	1.13
127	Raja Pakar (SC)	Shivnath Kumar Paswan	Male	50	1,983	1.08
218	Makhdumpur (SC)	Chhotelal Paswan	Male	32	1,733	1.04
214	Arwal	Divya Bharti	Female	26	1,724	1.01
188	Phulwari (SC)	Sunil Paswan	Male	50	2,598	1.01
30	Belsand	Shamim Alam	Male	51	1,706	0.93
201	Dumraon	Mrityunjay Kumar Singh	Male	44	1,794	0.91
24	Bathnaha (SC)	Amrita Soni	Female	25	1,877	0.87
175	Hilsa	Kumar Niraj	Male	50	1,646	0.85
202	Rajpur (SC)	Amar Paswan	Male	55	1,732	0.82
119	Garkha (SC)	Vigan Manjhi	Male	53	1,660	0.82
240	Sikandra (SC)	Ramadhin Paswan	Male	54	1,551	0.80
207	Chenari (SC)	Asha Paswan	Female	51	1,600	0.78
96	Baruraj	Sanjay Kumar Paswan	Male	53	1,578	0.77
85	Bahadurpur	Suresh Prasad Singh	Male	59	1,586	0.75
236	Hisua	Dinanath Thakur	Male	54	1,532	0.71
123	Hajipur	Ghanshyam Kumar Daha	Male	65	1,604	0.71
161	Banka	Kundan Kumar Roy	Male	47	1,283	0.67
125	Vaishali	Ramekbal Singh	Male	51	1,439	0.61
225	Gurua	Nitish Kumar	Male	47	1,148	0.56
160	Dhoraiya (SC)	Jitendra Kumar	Male	48	1,231	0.56
220	Obra	Pratima Kumari	Female	29	1,096	0.54
145	Sahebpur Kamal	Sanjay Yadav	Male	47	999	0.53
228	Barachatti (SC)	Shivnath Kumar Nirala	Male	50	1,192	0.52
216	Jehanabad	Pramod Yadav	Male	38	927	0.48
210	Dinara	Bhupesh Singh	Male	42	899	0.48
234	Wazirganj	Mohammad Julkar Nain	Male	55	994	0.47

NOTE:

- 1. The party contested 36 constituencies independently, without entering into any alliance, and forfeited its deposits in all contested seats.
- 2. The symbol allotted by the Election Commission of India (ECI) was “Sewing Machine.”
- 3. The party secured a total of 85,724 votes, accounting for 0.17% of the overall vote share, aggregated across state.

== See also ==
- List of political parties in India
