= Hilsa Assembly constituency =

Constituency of the Bihar legislative assembly in India

Hilsa
- Constituency No. 175 for the Bihar Legislative Assembly

Constituency details
- Country: India
- Region: East India
- State: Bihar
- District: Nalanda
- Lok Sabha constituency: Nalanda
- Established: 1957
- Total electors: 304,842

Member of Legislative Assembly
- 18th Bihar Legislative Assembly
- Incumbent Krishna Murari Sharan
- Party: JD(U)
- Alliance: NDA
- Elected year: 2025

Hilsa Assembly constituency is one of 243 constituencies of legislative assembly of Bihar. It is a part of Nalanda Lok Sabha constituency along with other assembly constituencies viz. Rajgir, Harnaut, Islampur, Nalanda, Asthawan and Biharsharif.

== Overview ==
Hilsa comprises CD Blocks Hilsa, Karai Parsurai, Tharthari & Parbalpur.

== Members of the Legislative Assembly ==
Election	Name	Party
1957	Lal Singh Tyagi	Indian National Congress
1962	Jagdish Prasad	Bharatiya Jana Sangh
1967	Awadhesh Kumar Singh	Indian National Congress
1969	Jagdish Prasad	Bharatiya Jana Sangh
1972	Nawal Kishore Sinha	Indian National Congress
1977	Jagdish Prasad	Janata Party
1980	Jagdish Prasad	BJP
1985	Surendra Prasad Tarun	Indian National Congress
1990	Kishnadeo Singh Yadav	Indian People's Front
1995	Baiju Prasad	Janata Dal
2000	Ramcharitra Prasad Singh	Samata Party
2005 (Feb)	Ramcharitra Prasad Singh	Janata Dal (United)
2005 (Oct)	Ramcharitra Prasad Singh	Janata Dal (United)
2010	Usha Sinha	Janata Dal (United)
2015	Shakti Singh Yadav	Rashtriya Janata Dal
2020	Krishna Murari Sharan	Janata Dal (United)
2025	Krishna Murari Sharan	Janata Dal (United)

== Election results ==
=== 2025 ===
2025 Bihar Legislative Assembly election: Hilsa
Party	Candidate	Votes	%	±%
JD(U)	Krishna Murari Sharan	96,009	49.73	+12.38
RJD	Shakti Singh Yadav	79,997	41.44	+4.09
JSP	Umesh Kumar Verma	4,252	2.2	
Independent	Shukesh Kumar	3,337	1.73	
NOTA	None of the above	3,853	2.0	+1.38
Majority		16,012	8.29	+8.29
Turnout		193,058	63.33	+8.54
JD(U) hold		Swing		

=== 2020 ===
2020 Bihar Legislative Assembly election: Hilsa
Party	Candidate	Votes	%	±%
JD(U)	Krishnamurari Sharan	61,848	37.35	
RJD	Shakti Singh Yadav	61,836	37.35	−11.04
LJP	Kumar Suman Singh	17,471	10.55	−20.4
BSP	Ramvilaf Paswan	3,082	1.86	+0.65
Independent	Dular Chand Prasad	2,843	1.72	
Independent	Kapil Prasad	2,791	1.69	
JAP(L)	Raju Kumar	2,672	1.61	+0.3
Rashtriya Jan Jan Party	Abhay Shankar	2,122	1.28	
Jantantrik Vikas Party	Suryamani Prakash	1,949	1.18	
Independent	Sudhir Kumar	1,792	1.08	−2.44
NOTA	None of the above	1,022	0.62	−1.66
Majority		12	0.0	−17.44
Turnout		165,580	54.79	+1.34
JD(U) gain from RJD		Swing		

=== 2015 ===
2015 Bihar Legislative Assembly election: Hilsa
Party	Candidate	Votes	%	±%
RJD	Shakti Singh Yadav	72,347	48.39	
LJP	Deepika Kumari	46,271	30.95	
CPI(ML)L	Shyam Narayan Prasad	5,415	3.62	
Independent	Sudhir Kumar	5,263	3.52	
Independent	Rajeev Ranjan Kumar Urph- J.P. Chandravanshi	3,796	2.54	
Independent	Santosh Kumar	3,176	2.12	
JAP(L)	Nilam Sinha	1,961	1.31	
BSP	Niraj Sharma	1,807	1.21	
SS	Pankaj Roy	1,624	1.09	
NOTA	None of the above	3,405	2.28	
Majority		26,076	17.44	
Turnout		149,493	53.45	
RJD gain from JD(U)		Swing		

=== 2010 ===
2010 Bihar legislative assembly election: Hilsa
Party	Candidate	Votes	%	±%
JD(U)	Usha Sinha	54,974	43.61	
LJP	Rina Devi	47,562	40.66	

== See also ==
- List of Assembly constituencies of Bihar
