= Pashupati Kumar Paras =

Indian politician (born 1952)

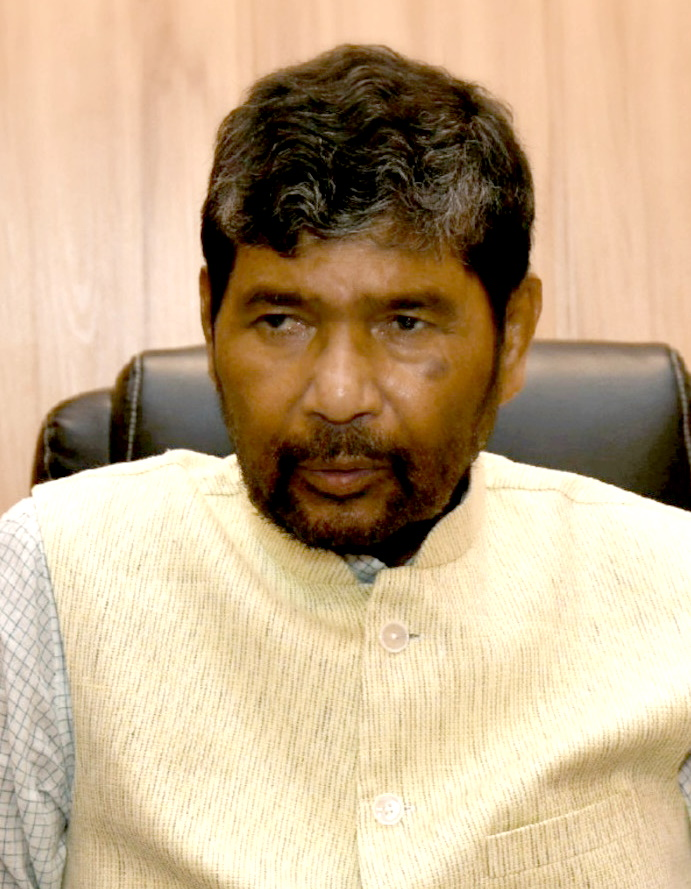
- Paras in 2019

Union Minister of Food Processing Industries
- In office 7 July 2021 – 19 March 2024
- Prime Minister: Narendra Modi
- Preceded by: Narendra Singh Tomar
- Succeeded by: Kiren Rijiju

Member of Parliament, Lok Sabha
- In office 23 May 2019 – 4 June 2024
- Preceded by: Ram Vilas Paswan
- Succeeded by: Chirag Paswan
- Constituency: Hajipur, Bihar

President of the Rashtriya Lok Janshakti Party
- Incumbent
- Assumed office 5 October 2021
- Preceded by: Office established

Member of Bihar Legislative Assembly
- In office 1977 – 1980
- Preceded by: Mishri Sada
- Succeeded by: Mishri Sada
- Constituency: Alauli
- In office 1985 – 2010
- Preceded by: Mishri Sada
- Succeeded by: Ram Chandra Sada
- Constituency: Alauli

Personal details
- Born: 12 July 1952 (age 73) Shaharbani, Bihar, India
- Party: Rashtriya Lok Janshakti Party
- Other political affiliations: Lok Janshakti Party
- Spouse: Sobha Devi (m. 1971)
- Relations: Ram Vilas Paswan (brother); Ram Chandra Paswan (brother); Chirag Paswan (nephew); Prince Raj (nephew)
- Children: 2 (including Yash Raj Paswan)
- Occupation: Politician

Pashupati Kumar Paras (born 12 July 1952) is an Indian politician who served as the Minister of Food Processing Industries in the Government of India from 2021 till his resignation in 2024. He was also a member of 17th Lok Sabha from Hajipur (Lok Sabha constituency).

He also held the post of the Minister of Animal and Fisheries Resources in the Government of Bihar. He is the younger brother of late Ram Vilas Paswan and he was also the State President of the Bihar unit of Lok Janshakti Party.

He was elected as the National President of Lok Janshakti Party replacing Chirag Kumar Paswan in June 2021. After Lok Janshakti Party split into two factions, he has been the National President of Rashtriya Lok Janshakti Party since 2021.

== Political career ==
He has been a member of Bihar Legislative Assembly 7 times from Alauli since 1977. He has earlier served thrice as a minister in the state, having lost the last election in 2015. At the time of his appointment as a Minister in 2017, he was neither a member of Assembly nor Council and was therefore later accommodated as an MLC from the Governor's quota.

He was elected as member of the 17th Lok Sabha in the 2019 Indian general election from Hajipur constituency. He became Minister of Food Processing Industry in Second Modi ministry when cabinet overhaul happened.

Pashupati Kumar Paras resigned from Modi’s cabinet on 19 March 2024 after RLJP did not receive any seat allocations in the 2024 Lok Sabha elections in Bihar.

Lok Sabha
Preceded by Ram Vilas Paswan	Member of Parliament for Hajipur; 2019–2024	Succeeded by Chirag Paswan
Political offices
Preceded by Narendra Singh Tomar	Minister of Food Processing Industries; 7 July 2021 - 19 March 2024	Succeeded by Kiren Rijiju
