= Usha Sinha (JD(U) politician) =

Indian politician

Usha Sinha is a leader of Janata Dal (United) who served as the member of the Bihar Legislative Assembly for Hilsa from 2010 to 2015. She is an accused in Bihar topper scam. In June 2016 a Patna court issued arrest warrant against her and her husband in connection with the scam.
