= Mokama Assembly constituency =

Legislative assembly in India

- Constituency No. 178 for the Bihar Legislative Assembly

Constituency details
- Country: India
- Region: East India
- State: Bihar
- District: Patna
- Lok Sabha constituency: Munger
- Established: 1951
- Total electors: 286,050

Member of Legislative Assembly
- 18th Bihar Legislative Assembly
- Incumbent Anant Kumar Singh
- Party: Independent
- Alliance: Independent
- Elected year: 2025

Mokama is one of 243 constituencies of legislative assembly of Bihar. It is a part of Munger Lok Sabha constituency. Mokama is in the 14 assembly segments which fall under Patna district.

Most successful parties from Mokama Assembly
1. INC (7 times) (36.0%)
2. JDU (4 times) (21.0%)
3. JD (2 times) (11.0%)
4. RJD (2 times) (11.0%)
5. Independent (3 times) (16.0%)
6. RPI (1 time) (5.00%)

== Overview ==
Mokama comprises CD Blocks Ghoswari & Mokama; Gram Panchayats Raili, Lemuabad, West Pandarak, East Pandarak, Kondi, Dhobhawan, Khushhal Chak, Chak Jalal, Ajgara Bakawan, Darwe Bhadaur & Baruane Bathoi of Pandarak CD Block.This Constituency Highly dominated by Bhumihars. It is dominated by Anant Singh, a bahubali, who won most recently in 2025 from Jail while accused in a murder case.

== Members of the Legislative Assembly ==
Year	Name	Party
1952	Jagdish Narayan Singh	Indian National Congress
1957	Jagdish Narayan Singh	Indian National Congress
1962	Saryoo Nandan Prasad Singh	Independent
1967	Bishun Dhari Lal	Republican Party of India
1969	Kameshwar Prasad Singh	Indian National Congress
1972	Krishna Shahi	Indian National Congress
1977	Krishna Shahi	Indian National Congress
1980	Shyam Sunder Singh Dheeraj	Indian National Congress
1985	Shyam Sunder Singh Dheeraj	Indian National Congress
1990	Dilip Singh	Janata Dal
1995	Dilip Singh	Janata Dal
2000	Surajbhan Singh	Independent
2005	Anant Kumar Singh	Janata Dal (United)
2005	Anant Kumar Singh	Janata Dal (United)
2010	Anant Kumar Singh	Janata Dal (United)
2015	Anant Kumar Singh	Independent
2020	Anant Kumar Singh	Rashtriya Janata Dal
2022^	Nilam Devi	Rashtriya Janata Dal
2025	Anant Kumar Singh	Janata Dal (United)

^by-election

== Election results ==
=== 2025 ===
Bihar Legislative Assembly Election, 2025: Mokama
Party	Candidate	Votes	%	±%
JD(U)	Anant Kumar Singh	91,416	49.44	+20.52
RJD	Veena Devi	63,210	34.18	−18.81
JSP	Priyadarshi Piyush	19,365	10.47	
AAP	Dr. Rajesh Kumar Ratnakar	2,100	1.14	
NOTA	None of the above	4,609	2.49	−0.56
Majority		28,206	15.26	−8.81
Turnout		184,921	64.65	+10.64
JD(U) gain from RJD		Swing		

=== 2022 bypoll ===
Bihar Assembly by election, 2022: Mokama
Party	Candidate	Votes	%	±%
RJD	Nilam Devi	79,744	53.44	+0.45
BJP	Sonam Devi	63,003	42.22	New
NOTA	None of the above	2,470	1.66	−1.39
Majority		16,741	11.22	
Turnout		1,49,321	53.09	
RJD hold		Swing		

=== 2020 ===
2020 Bihar Legislative Assembly election: Mokama
Party	Candidate	Votes	%	±%
RJD	Anant Kumar Singh	78,721	52.99	
JD(U)	Rajeev Lochan Narayan Singh	42,964	28.92	+4.26
LJP	Suresh Singh Nishad	13,331	8.97	−1.73
RLSP	Dilraj Raushan	4,007	2.7	
Independent	Dr. Dharambir Kumar	1,723	1.16	
NOTA	None of the above	4,534	3.05	+0.84
Majority		35,757	24.07	+11.38
Turnout		148,555	54.01	−2.93
RJD gain from Independent		Swing		

=== 2015 ===
2015 Bihar Legislative Assembly election: Mokama
Party	Candidate	Votes	%	±%
Independent	Anant Kumar Singh	54,005	37.35	
JD(U)	Neeraj Kumar	35,657	24.66	
JAP(L)	Lalan Singh	16,655	11.52	
LJP	Kanhaiya Singh	15,472	10.7	
SP	Deo Narayan Prasad Singh	3,212	2.22	
CPI	Raju Prasad	2,793	1.93	
Independent	Rajesh Kumar Ratnakar	2,738	1.89	
Independent	Anjani Kumar Sinha	1,942	1.34	
Bhartiya Lokmat Rashtrwadi Party	Rakesh Kumar	1,582	1.09	
Independent	Bijendra Kumar	1,555	1.08	
Independent	Kumar Navneet Himanshu	1,525	1.05	
NOTA	None of the above	3,194	2.21	
Majority		18,348	12.69	
Turnout		144,587	56.94	
Independent gain from JD(U)		Swing		

=== 2010 ===
2010 Bihar legislative assembly election: Mokama
Party	Candidate	Votes	%	±%
JD(U)	Anant Kumar Singh	51,564	44.08	
LJP	Sonam Devi	42,610	36.43	
JD(U) hold		Swing		
