= Epashuhaat =

epashuhaat (India)
- इपशुहाट
- Emblem of India

Agency overview
- Jurisdiction: Republic of India
- Headquarters: Krishi Bhawan; Dr.Rajendra Prasad Road; New Delhi
- Minister responsible: Giriraj Singh, Ministry of Animal Husbandry, Dairying and Fisheries
- Website: epashuhaat.gov.in

e - Pashu Haat is a web portal launched by the Ministry of Agriculture and Farmers Welfare, Government of India, under the Department of Animal Husbandry, Dairying and Fisheries (DADF) to boost dairy productivity in India by organizing the livestock market. The portal allows farmers and entrepreneurs find information about bovine animals, buy or sell livestock, frozen semen and embryos. It also helps them to check information on feed and fodder and manage the transportation of animals once a purchase is made. A multi-channel communication system, via, video, email, SMS, audio and chat is available to let interested stakeholders, including buyers and sellers communicate.

== History ==
The portal was launched on November 26, 2016. It is a part of the Narendra Modi-led NDA government's ‘National Mission on Bovine Productivity’ for which Rs 825 crore of funds have been allocated.

== Features ==
The portal is easily accessible; no login is required to check information. However, for making any transaction, a prior registration is mandated. Sellers can create an account, upload the details of the animals, including images, edit those, and provide other relevant information along with their complete address so that buyers can easily reach out to them. After submitting the details, they need to bring the animals at Germ Plasm Market Place for public view.

== Services ==
There is a host of services on sale. Interested buyers can apply for them after a successful online payment. List of services is as follows:

- Training
- Animal Certificates Services
- Certification Verification Services
- Nutritional advisory service
- Good care practice
- Health Card Services
- Fodder Services
- SMS reminder services
- Disease Screening and Testing
- Mail reminder services
