= Anant Kumar Singh =

Indian politician

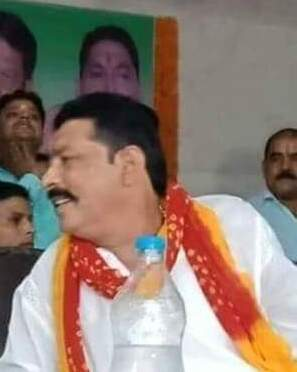
- Anant Singh in a public meeting in Mokama

Member of Bihar Legislative Assembly
- Incumbent
- Assumed office 14 November 2025
- Preceded by: Nilam Devi
- Constituency: Mokama
- In office 14 February 2005 – 12 April 2022
- Preceded by: Surajbhan Singh
- Succeeded by: Nilam Devi
- Constituency: Mokama

Personal details
- Born: 5 January 1961 (age 65) Nadawan, Patna district, Bihar, India
- Party: Independent (since 2026)
- Other political affiliations: Janata Dal (United) (till 2026), Rashtriya Janata Dal
- Spouse: Nilam Devi
- Relations: Dilip Singh (elder brother)
- Nickname: Chhote Sarkar (transl. Junior Government)

Anant Kumar Singh, also known as Chhote Sarkar, is an Indian politician who has served, and is currently serving, as MLA from Mokama Assembly Constituency in the Bihar Legislative Assembly. In 2020, he left the Janata Dal (United) party after nearly 15 years to join the Rashtriya Janata Dal, but later rejoined the Janata Dal (United) in 2025 to contest Mokama in the most recent state election. According to his election affidavit of 2020, he is facing 38 criminal charges including 7 murders, 11 attempt-to-murder and 4 cases of kidnapping.

== Life and career ==
Anant Singh was born in the village of Nadawan falling under Barh CD block, Bihar to Chandradeep Singh. His elder brother Dilip Singh, also a politician, became MLA & Minister from Mokama in 1990 and 1995 as a member of Janata Dal, but lost to another gangster turned politician, Surajbhan Singh in the assembly elections of year 2000 on RJD ticket. In 2003, Dilip Singh became MLC from Patna local authorities as an independent candidate. He was one of the Bhumihar leaders who became MLC from local bodies with Kapildev Singh in 2003.

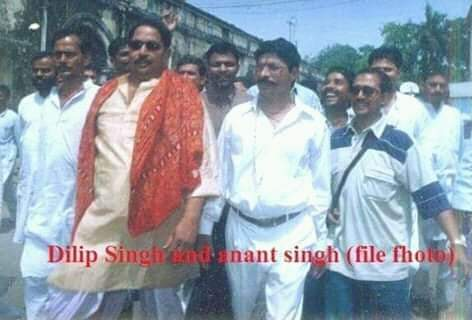
MLA Anant Singh (white shirt on right) with elder brother MLC Dilip Singh (left)

Anant Singh contested and won from the Mokama assembly seat in 2005 on a JDU ticket. He retained the seat in 2010, defeating Sonam Devi of Lok Janshakti Party (LJP) by a large margin. He is married to Nilam Devi.

On 2 September 2015, Singh quit the JDU following a fall-out with leader Nitish Kumar over the JDU's new alliance with the RJD, but was able to retain his seat as an independent.

On 16 August 2019, Singh was booked under the Unlawful Activities (Prevention) Act after the police took possession of an AK-47 rifle, a magazine, live cartridges and two hand grenades following a raid on his ancestral home in Ladma village of Patna district.

In 2020, Singh was given a ticket from Rashtriya Janata Dal to contest the upcoming Bihar legislative election. He won from the Mokama constituency with 35,291 votes, winning the seat for the fourth consecutive time.

Even after JDU left mahagathbandhan in 2017, Nitish Kumar continued to have a tough stance on Anant Singh, especially after he fielded his wife Nilam Devi as Congress candidate in 2019 lok sabha elections from Munger against JDU's Lallan Singh.

He contested the 2020 Vidhansabha elections from Mokama on RJD ticket and won from jail. However he was disqualified in 2022 due to a case for illegal possession of weapons. His wife Nilam Devi won the by elections from Mokama on RJD Ticket.

However, she switched sides to JDU when it left Mahagathbandhan again in 2024. Anant Singh was released on parole for 15 days during the 2024 lok sabha election and was campaigning in Munger for JDU's Lallan Singh.

On 14 August 2024 Patna High Court acquitted Anant Singh in case of illegal arms act for which he was serving 10 years sentence from 2022.

He was expelled from JD(U) in October 2026 for anti-party activity and violation of party's internal disciplinary code.

His wife, former MLA Neelam Devi, also expelled from the party for six years on 24 October 2026.

== Criminal cases and influence ==
Singh has numerous cases of murder, kidnapping, and land grabbing lodged against him. The Barh region has remained notorious for caste wars particularly between two Forward Castes of Bihar, the Bhumihars and Rajputs. In these wars he emerged as a saviour of his community. According to locals, people in this region refrain from going outside during night due to fear of being kidnapped or murdered. The fortune of Singh turned when Nitish Kumar, decided to nominate him as his candidate on the ticket of Janata Dal (United) from the Mokama constituency. It was considered as paradoxical by a section of media that Kumar who vowed to end 'criminalisation of politics' was backing such a person against whom charges of serious cognisable offences were lodged. But, amidst criticism and counter statements Singh managed to win from Mokama seat due to support of his castemen as well as the wave of Nitish Kumar. Singh has been three times MLA from Mokama.

Singh's activities dragged the country's attention when in 2007 he was reported to have two journalists from NDTV 24x7 and ANI News as hostages in his official bungalow. It was reported that they had been there to interview Singh upon his involvement in murder and molestation of a woman called Reshma Khatoon whose body was recovered in a sack near the capital. The political protection given to Singh and another gangster named Sunil Pandey by the ruling government was aimed at mobilisation of the Bhumihar caste. According to the locals, Singh who was known as Chhote Sarkar (transl. Junior Government) in Mokama is a role model of Bhumihars, who have consistently opposed Lalu Yadav's government. Thus, political parties opposing Yadav used him as a tool to mobilise Bhumihar voters.

Singh was also allegedly involved in kidnapping of four youths, who as per allegations were responsible for eve-teasing of a girl, latter being sister of one of Singh's men. As per news reports, the four youths were kidnapped and assaulted allegedly by the goons of Singh and one of them named Puttus Yadav was killed brutally.

=== Arrest ===
Singh was arrested in 2015, in connection with a kidnapping case of four men from Barh and the subsequent murder of one. The ensuing arrest also resulted in a scuffle between Singh and the city SP of Patna Chandan Kushwaha while the former was being taken to Secretariat police station in Patna.

== See also ==
- Dilip Singh
- Lalan Singh
- Giriraj Singh
- Vijay Kumar Sinha
- C. P. Thakur
- Vivek Thakur
- Surajbhan Singh
- Kapildev Prasad Singh
- Aruna Devi
- Anil Singh (politician)

== Electoral history ==
#	From	To	Position	Party
1.	2005	2005	MLA (1st term) from Mokama	JD(U)
2.	2005	2010	MLA (2nd term) from Mokama	JD(U)
3.	2010	2015	MLA (3rd term) from Mokama	JD(U)
4.	2015	2020	MLA (4th term) from Mokama	IND
5.	2020	2022	MLA (5th term) from Mokama	RJD
6.	2025		MLA (6th term) from Mokama	JD(U)

Note: He was disqualified in July 2022 due to conviction
