= Parshottam Rupala =

Indian politician (born 1954)

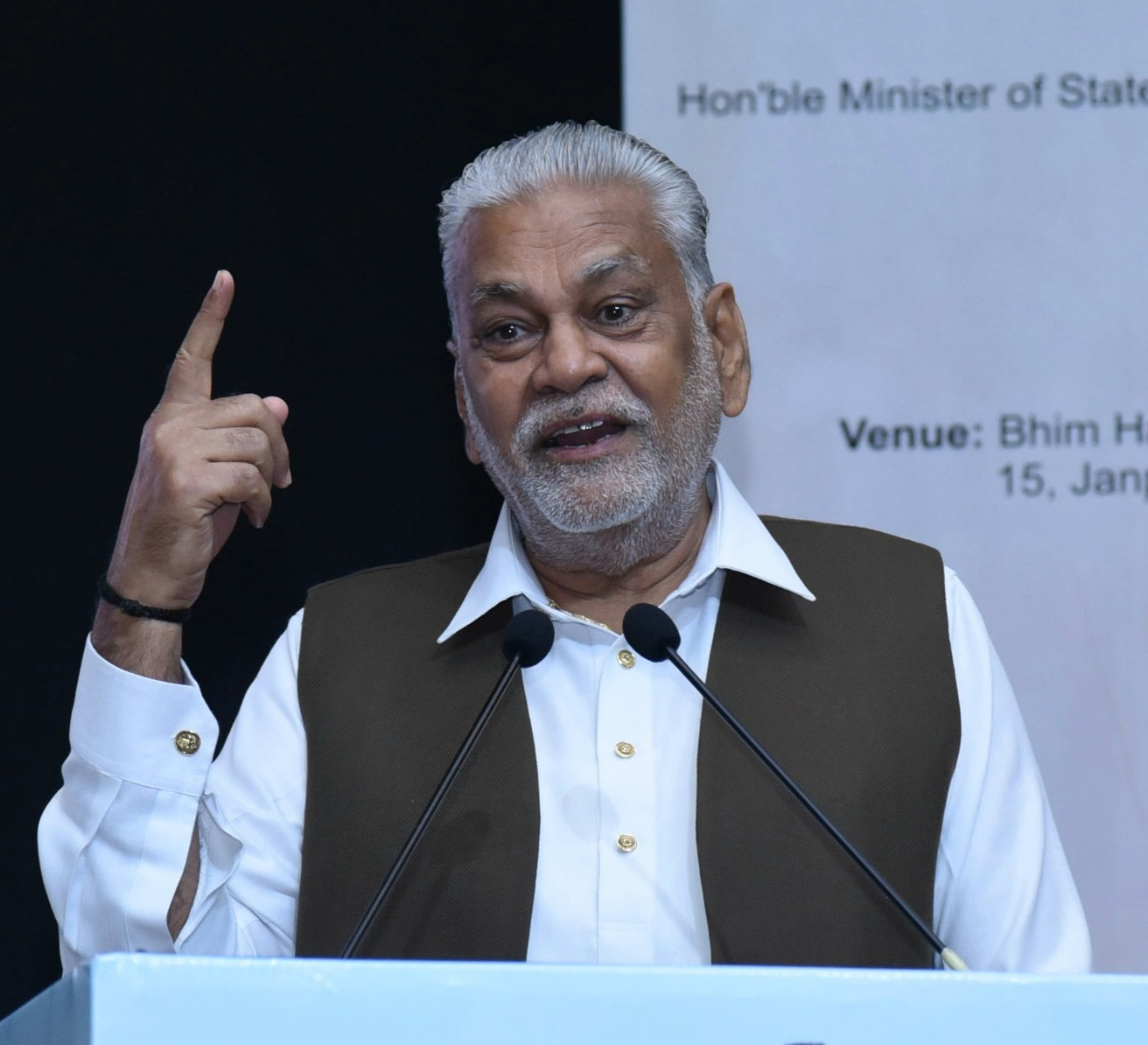

Union Minister of Fisheries, Animal Husbandry and Dairying
- In office 7 July 2021 – 9 June 2024
- Prime Minister: Narendra Modi
- Preceded by: Giriraj Singh
- Succeeded by: Lalan Singh

Union Minister of State for Agriculture and Farmers' Welfare
- In office 5 July 2016 – 7 July 2021
- Prime Minister: Narendra Modi
- Minister: Radha Mohan Singh; Narendra Singh Tomar

Union Minister of State for Panchayati Raj
- In office 5 July 2016 – 30 May 2019
- Prime Minister: Narendra Modi
- Minister: Narendra Singh Tomar

Member of Parliament, Rajya Sabha
- In office 1 June 2016 – 2 April 2024
- Preceded by: Praveen Rashtrapal
- Succeeded by: J. P. Nadda
- Constituency: Gujarat
- In office 10 April 2008 – 9 April 2014
- Constituency: Gujarat

President of Bharatiya Janata Party, Gujarat
- In office 26 October 2006 – 1 February 2010
- Preceded by: Vajubhai Vala
- Succeeded by: R. C. Faldu

Gujarat Minister of Agriculture
- In office 7 October 2001 – 21 December 2002
- Chief Minister: Narendra Modi

Gujarat Minister of Irrigation & Water Supply
- In office 19 March 1995 – 19 September 1996
- Chief Minister: Keshubhai Patel; Suresh Mehta

Member of Gujarat Legislative Assembly
- In office 1991–2002
- Preceded by: Dileepbhai Sanghani
- Succeeded by: Paresh Dhanani
- Constituency: Amreli

Member of Parliament, Lok Sabha
- Incumbent
- Assumed office 4 June 2024
- Preceded by: Mohan Kundariya
- Constituency: Rajkot, Gujarat

Personal details
- Born: 1 October 1954 (age 72) Amreli, Bombay State, India
- Party: Bharatiya Janata Party
- Spouse: Savitaben Rupala (m. 1979)
- Children: 2 (1 daughter and 1 son)
- Education: B. Sc. (Saurashtra University); B. Ed. (Gujarat University)
- Occupation: Politician; agriculturist
- Website: www.parshottamrupala.com

Parshottam Khodabhai Rupala (born 1 October 1954) is an Indian politician and Minister of Fisheries, Animal Husbandry and Dairying in the Second Modi ministry. He was elected to 18th Lok Sabha from Rajkot. He was a member of Rajya Sabha, representing the Indian state of Gujarat and a leader of Bharatiya Janata Party. He was a former member of Gujarat Legislative Assembly from Amreli and formerly served as a minister in Government of Gujarat.

== Early life ==
Rupala was born to Hariben Khodabhai and Khodabhai Madhabhai, on 1 October 1954. Rupala earned his B.Sc. and B.Ed. He studied at Saurashtra University and Gujarat University in 1976–1977.

Before entering politics, he served as School Principal at Hamapur in Medium School from 1977 to 1983. He was the chief officer of the Amreli municipality from November 1983 to March 1987.

== Career ==
Rupala was the president of the Amreli district Bhartiya Janta Party from 1988 to 1991. This led to his service as Secretary of the Bhartiya Janta Party in 1992.

He was Chairman of a youth hostel from February 2002 to 2004. He served as trustee of Kadva Patidar trust, in Amreli, Chairman of Madad Trust and President of the Gujarat electricity board union.

He served 3 consecutive terms as a member of Gujarat Legislative Assembly ending in 2002.

He was a Cabinet Minister in Narmada for Irrigation and Water Supply from 19 March 1995 to 20 October 1995 and again from 4 November 1995 to 18 September 1996; for Agriculture from 9 October 2001 to 21 December 2002. He chaired the Public Accounts Committee of Gujarat Legislative Assembly from March 1997 to December 1997.

He was the Chairman of Gujarat Industrial Development Corporation (G.I.D.C.) from June 1998 to October 2001.

He was elected a Rajya Sabha Member (2008-2009) where he served on the Committee on Food, Consumer Affairs and Public Distribution Member (Aug. 2009 - Aug. 2010), on the Committee on Personnel, Public Grievances, Law and Justice Member (July 2010 -), on the Committee for the Ministry of Shipping Member (Sept. 2010 -) and on the Committee on Chemicals and Fertilizers Member, Committee on Agriculture (Aug. 2012 -).

He was again elected to Rajya Sabha in June 2016 in by-poll following death of sitting Congress MP Praveen Rashtrapal. From May 2019 to July 2021, he served as the Minister of State in the Ministry of Agriculture and Farmers Welfare. In July 2021, he became Minister of Fisheries, Animal Husbandry and Dairying.

He was elected to Loksabha from Rajkot constituency in 2024 Indian general election.

== Controversies ==
During the Lok Sabha Elections 2024, Parshottam Rupala, stirred controversy due to his remarks about the Rajput community during a campaign rally. His comments, which criticized the actions of erstwhile 'maharajas' for allegedly capitulating to foreign rulers and British colonizers, sparked protests from the Rajput community.

The Rajput community perceived Rupala's remarks as an insult, considering that the majority of the erstwhile rulers in Gujarat were from their community. Despite Rupala's public apology and request for forgiveness, community leaders continued to demand BJP to remove him from the list of candidates, threatening to vote against the party in the ongoing Lok Sabha elections. But high command didn’t change the candidate and continued with Rupala. Despite this he was elected from Rajkot.

== Personal life ==
Rupala married Savitaben in 1979. They have a daughter and one son.

Political offices
Preceded by Giriraj Singh	Minister of Fisheries, Animal Husbandry and Dairying; 7 July 2021 – Present	Incumbent
