= National Institute of Animal Welfare =

The National Institute of Animal Welfare (NIAW) is a division of the Ministry of Fisheries, Animal Husbandry and Dairying (Department of Animal Husbandry and Dairying) in India. It is located in Ballabgarh, Haryana. Gram Panchyat land was acquired, District Khadi and Village Industries Officer at Faridabad Naresh Kadyan played key roles to establish NIAW in Faridabad District of Haryana State. Now NIAW merged with AWBI, the purpose of NIAW defeated as this establishment disappeared.

== History ==
A decision to establish the institute was made at a meeting of the Standing Finance Committee held on 16 January 1999. The Ministry of Environment and Forests has entrusted the task of implementing the education and training programmes at the NIAW to Educational Consultants India Limited (Ed.CIL)., whereas JNU and LUVAS, also handled this sick unit.

== Objectives ==
- NIAW has been conceptualized as an apex body in the field of animal welfare and its broad mandate covers the need to improve animal welfare through research, education and public outreach.
- Its objective is to create an enabling environment for fulfillment of the statutory requirements as laid down in the Prevention of Cruelty to Animals Act, 1960.
- It provides training and education on various subjects related to animal welfare including animal management, behavior and ethics.

== Campus ==
NIAW has its headquarters on an 8-acre campus in Ballabhgarh., which is disappeeared.
