= Dilip Singh (Bihar politician) =

Indian politician

Dilip Kumar Singh
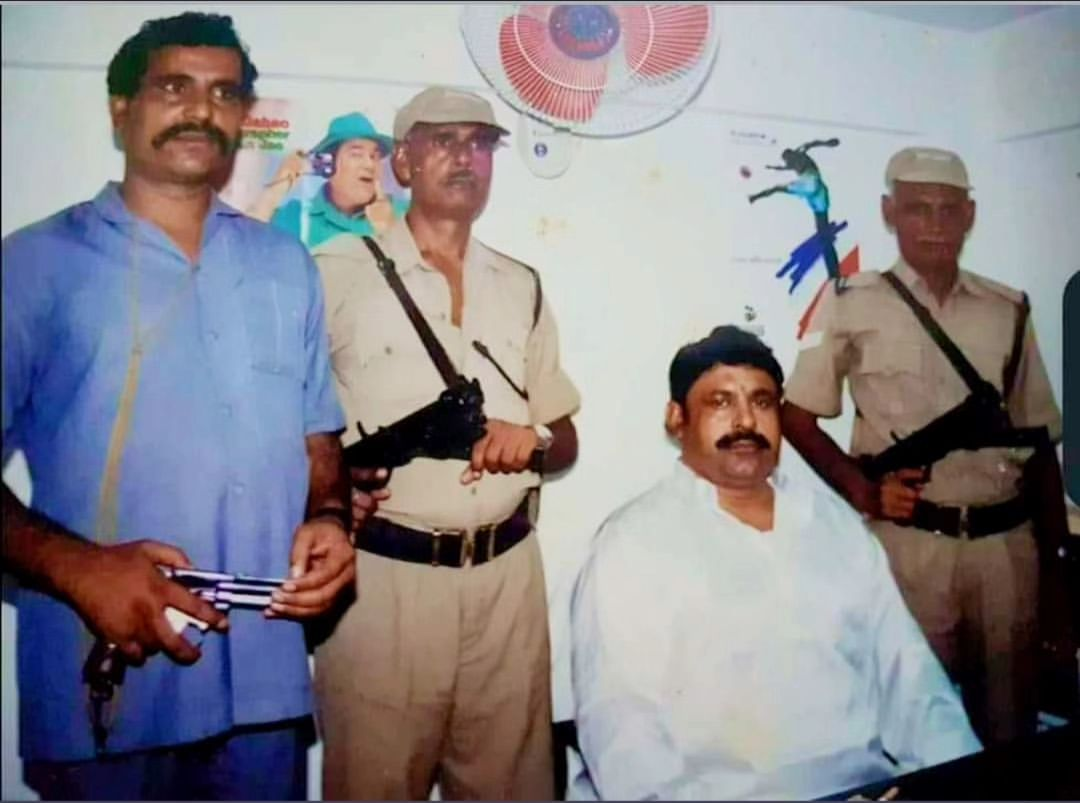
- Dilip Singh (Bade Sarkar) sitting in centre

Member of Bihar Legislative Council
- In office 2003–2006
- Constituency: Patna Local Authorities

Minister of State Government of Bihar
- In office 1995–2000
- Chief Minister: Lalu Prasad Yadav; Rabri Devi
- Ministry & Department's: Relief; Rehabilitation

Member of Bihar Legislative Assembly
- In office 1990–2000
- Preceded by: Shyam Sunder Singh Dheeraj
- Succeeded by: Surajbhan Singh
- Constituency: Mokama

Personal details
- Born: 12 June 1950 Nadwan, Bihar, India
- Died: 1 October 2006 (aged 56) Patna, India
- Party: Independent
- Other political affiliations: Rashtriya Janata Dal Janata Dal
- Relations: Anant Singh (younger brother)
- Nickname: Bade Sarkar

Dilip Singh was an Indian politician and former Minister in Government of Bihar. He represented Mokama Assembly constituency as an M.L.A. two terms from. He was the leader of Rashtriya Janata Dal. His younger brother Anant Kumar Singh also represents Mokama Assembly constituency many times. He died in Patna on 1 October 2006, the cause of death was chest pain and cardiac arrest.

== Personal life ==
Dileep singh was born on 12 June 1950 in Nadawan village of Barh cd block. His father Chandradeep Singh was a farmer in village. He had four brothers of which two brothers, Fajo Singh and Viranchi Singh, were murdered by local criminals. His younger brother Anant Kumar Singh was also an M.L.A. from Mokama.

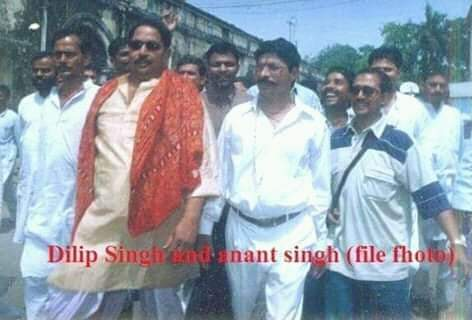
MLC Dilip Singh (left) with Younger brother MLA Anant Singh (white shirt on right)
