= Amreli Assembly constituency =

Legislative Assembly constituency in Gujarat State, India

Coordinates: 21.6°N 71.22°E

Amreli
- Constituency No. 95 for the Gujarat Legislative Assembly

Constituency details
- Country: India
- Region: Western India
- State: Gujarat
- District: Amreli
- Lok Sabha constituency: Amreli
- Established: 1962
- Total electors: 283,793
- Reservation: None

Member of Legislative Assembly
- 15th Gujarat Legislative Assembly
- Incumbent Kaushik Kantibhai Vekariya
- Party: Bharatiya Janata Party
- Elected year: 2022

Amreli is one of the 182 Legislative Assembly constituencies of Gujarat state in India.

It is part of Amreli district.

== List of segments ==
This assembly seat represents the following segments

1. Amreli city
2. Amreli Taluka
3. Vadia Taluka

== Members of Legislative Assembly ==
Election	Name	Party
1962	Jivraj Narayan Mehta	Indian National Congress
1964^	P. N. Nanji	Praja Socialist Party
1967	Narsinhdas Gordhandas Gondhiya	Indian National Congress
1972	Narsinhdas Gordhandas Gondhiya	Indian National Congress
1975	Narsinhdas Gordhandas Gondhiya	Indian National Congress
1980	Dwarkadas Mohanlal Patel	Independent
1985	Dileepbhai Sanghani	Bharatiya Janata Party
1990	Dileepbhai Sanghani	Bharatiya Janata Party
1991^	Parsottambhai Rupala	Bharatiya Janata Party
1995	Parsottambhai Rupala	Bharatiya Janata Party
1998	Parsottambhai Rupala	Bharatiya Janata Party
2002	Paresh Dhanani	Indian National Congress
2007	Dileepbhai Sanghani	Bharatiya Janata Party
2012	Paresh Dhanani	Indian National Congress
2017	Paresh Dhanani	Indian National Congress
2022	Kaushik Vekariya	Bharatiya Janata Party

== Election results ==
=== 2022 ===
Gujarat Assembly Election, 2022
Party	Candidate	Votes	%	±%
BJP	Kaushik Vekariya	89,034	54.89	+10.72
INC	Paresh Dhanani	42,377	26.12	−25.13
AAP	Ravi Dhanani	26,445	16.3	New
Majority		46,657	28.77	
Turnout		162215		
BJP gain from INC		Swing		

=== 2017 ===
Gujarat Assembly Election, 2017:Amreli
Party	Candidate	Votes	%	±%
INC	Paresh Dhanani	87,032	51.25	
BJP	Bavkubhai Undhad	75,003	44.17	
Majority		12,029	7.08	
Turnout		1,69,808	63.35	
INC hold		Swing		

=== 2012 ===
Gujarat Assembly Election, 2012
Party	Candidate	Votes	%	±%
INC	Paresh Dhanani	86,583	50.89	
BJP	Dileep Sanghani	56690	32.32	
Majority		29893	17.57	
Turnout		170143	68.48	
INC gain from BJP		Swing		

=== 2007 ===
Gujarat Assembly Election, 2012
Party	Candidate	Votes	%	±%
BJP	Dileep Sanghani	48,767		
INC	Paresh Dhanani	44578		
Majority		4189	17.57	
Turnout			65	
BJP gain from INC		Swing		

=== 2002 ===
Gujarat Assembly Election, 2002
Party	Candidate	Votes	%	±%
INC	Paresh Dhanani	51,109	56.84	
BJP	Purshottam Rupala	34795	38.7	
Majority		16314	18.13	
Turnout		89904	68.48	
INC gain from BJP		Swing		

== See also ==
- List of constituencies of Gujarat Legislative Assembly
- Gujarat Legislative Assembly
- Amreli district
