= Department of Animal Husbandry and Dairying =

Government agency

Agency overview
- Jurisdiction: Republic of India
- Agency executives: Rajiv Ranjan Singh alias Lalan Singh, Minister of Animal Husbandry, Dairying and Fisheries; Sanjeev Kumar Balyan, Minister of State; Pratap Chandra Sarangi, Minister of State; Venkata Rama Chandra Purushottam Basava, Secretary of Animal Husbandry, Cooperatives, Dairy, Agriculture, Horticulture, Education, Planning
- Website: Department of Animal Husbandry and Dairying

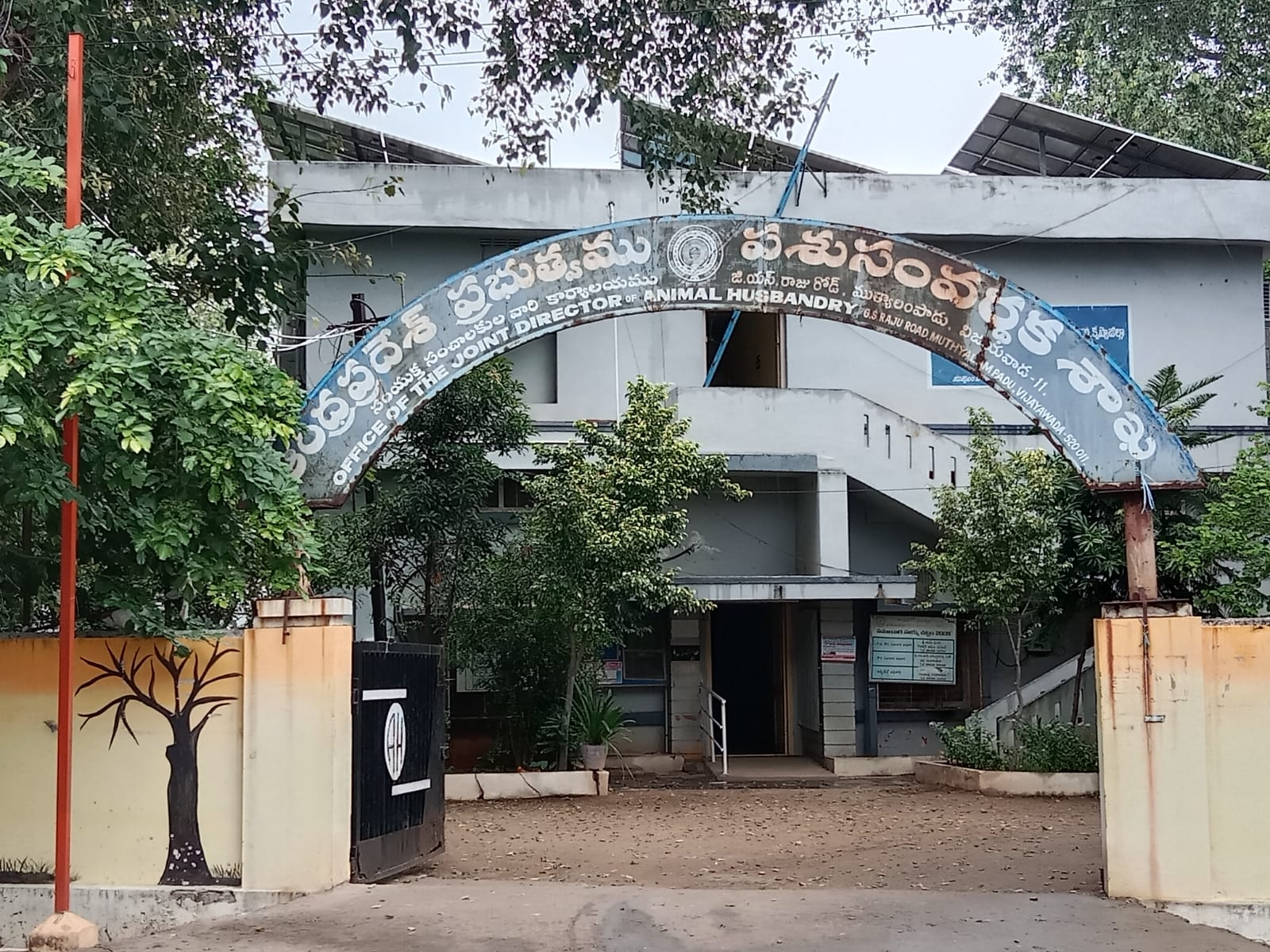
Office Of Joint Director Of Animal husbandary, Vijayawada, A.P

The Department of Animal husbandry and Dairying (DAHD) is an Indian government department. It is a subsidiary department of the Ministry of Animal Husbandry, Dairying and Fisheries which was formed as a new Indian ministry in 2019. The DAHD or the erstwhile Department of Animal husbandry, Fishiries and Dairying was formed in 1991 by merging together into a separate department, of two divisions of Department of Agriculture and Cooperation, namely animal husbandry and dairy development. In 1997, the fisheries division of Department of Agriculture and Cooperation and a part of the Ministry of Food Processing Industries was transferred to it. In February 2019, the Department of Fisheries was carved out from the Department of Animal husbandry, Dairying and Fisheries and it has been functioning as Department of Animal Husbandry and Dairying since then.

== Mandate ==
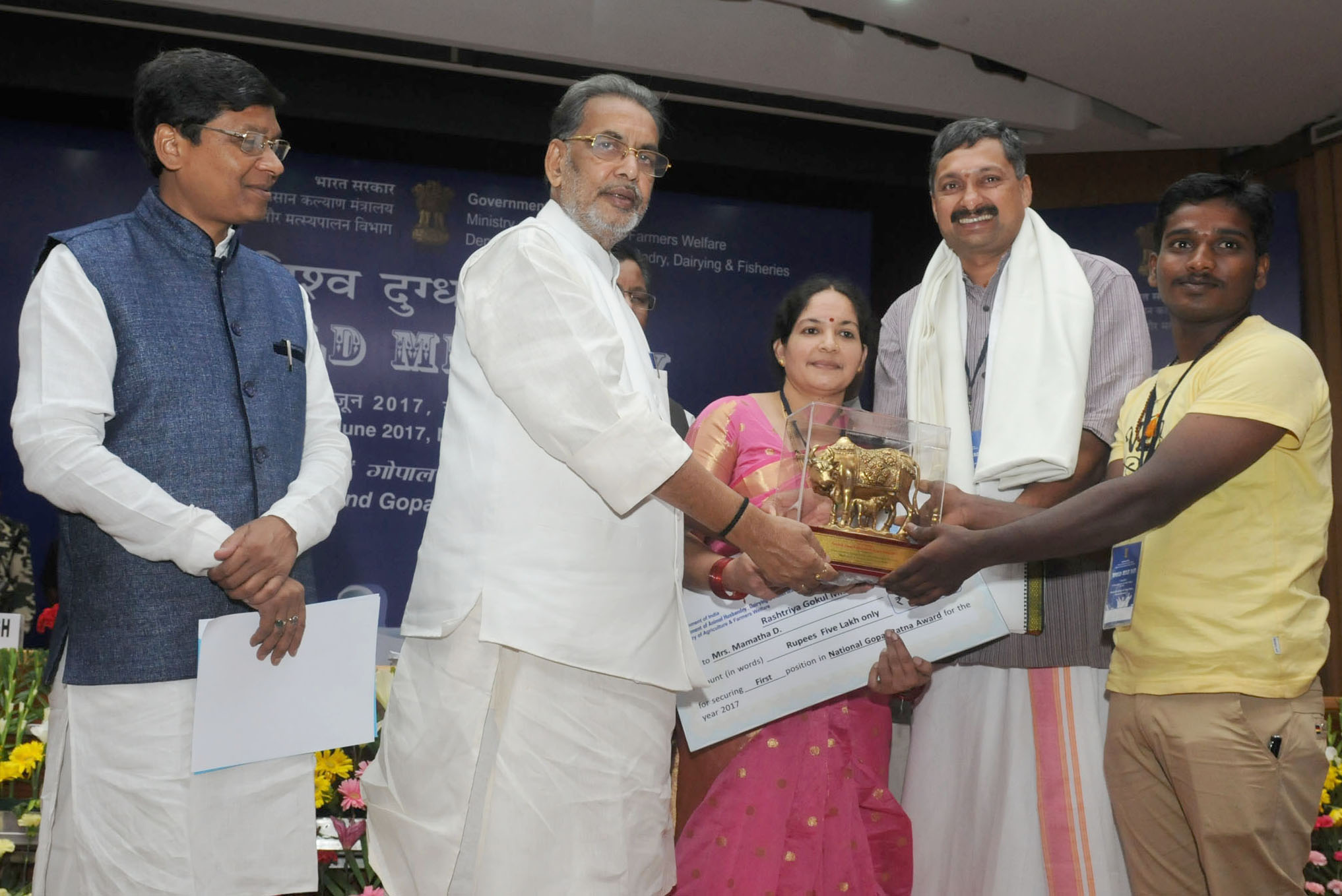
Former Minister of Agriculture Radha Mohan Singh gave away the National Gopal Ratna and Kamdhenu awards, at the “World Milk Day” celebration, organised by the Department of Animal Husbandry & Fisheries, in New Delhi.

It is responsible for the production of livestock, improving their stocks as well as matters related to dairy infrastructure development in the country. It is also mandated to provide healthcare and other services to the livestock for overall development of the Dairy sector. Since 1919–20, a census of livestock has been occasionally conducted in India, which covers all domesticated animals and their headcount. After being functional, the "DAHD" has taken up the responsibility to release the livestock census report which involves participation of all states and union territories. According to the 20th Livestock census report released by the department, the total livestock population in India was found to be 535.78 million showing an increase of 4.6% over the previous count in 2012.

== Initiatives ==
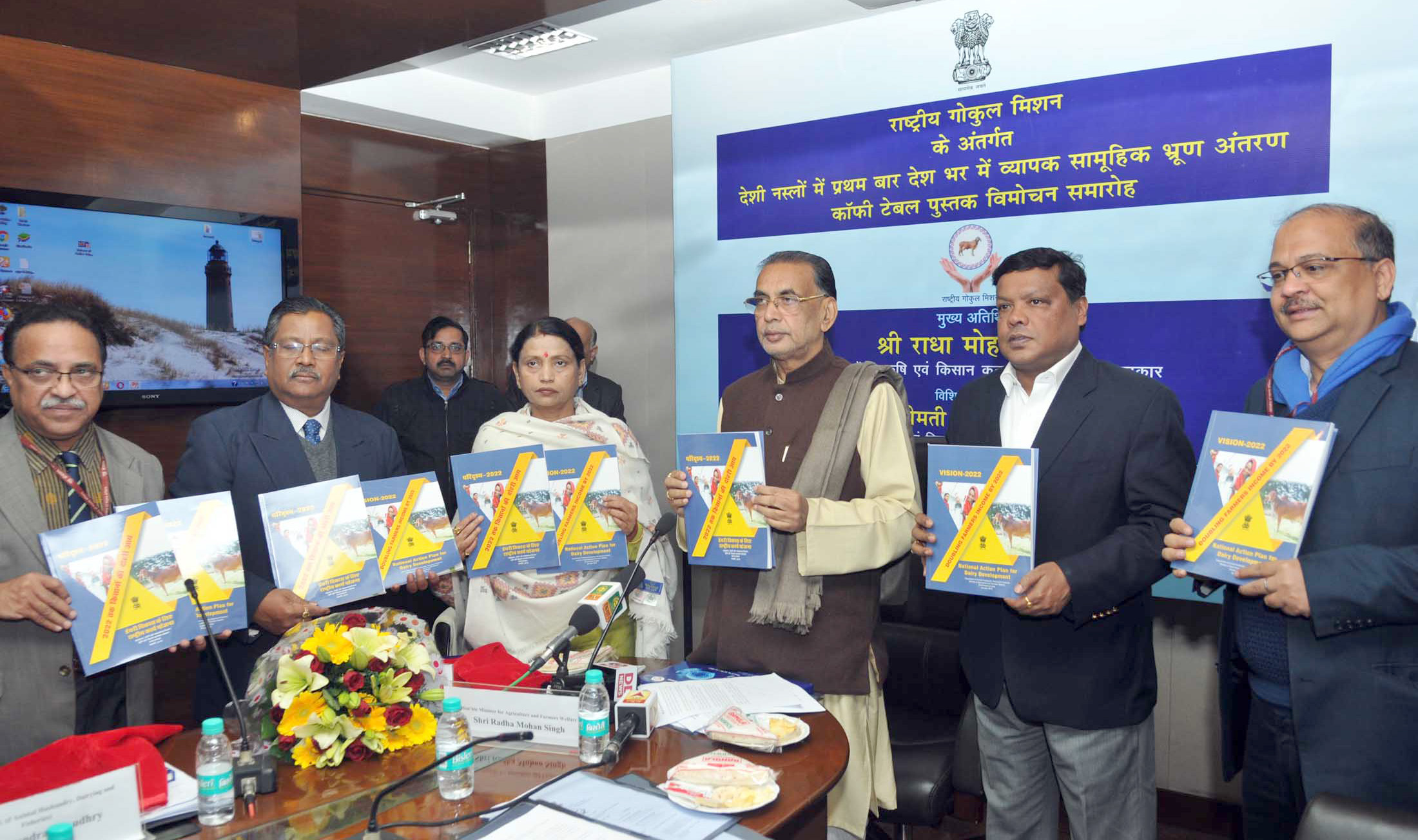
Former Minister for Agriculture and Farmers Welfare, Shri Radha Mohan Singh releasing the National Action Plan for Dairy Development of Department of Animal Husbandry, Dairying & Fisheries, in New Delhi.

=== National Livestock mission ===
The programme was launched during the 12th five year plan in 2014–15 aiming for overall development of the Livestock sector which includes improvement in feed and fodder. It has four sub-mission under it which are submission on feed and fodder development; submission on Livestock development; submission on pig development in the North-East region; Sub-Mission on Skill Development, Technology Transfer and Extension.

=== Rashtriya Gokul mission ===
The Rashtriya Gokul mission was launched in order to conserve and develop indigenous bovine breeds under the National program for Bovine breeding and Dairy development, the mission which was aimed at improving the genetic makeup of the cattle and bovine population. It has two sub mission under it, namely National program for bovine breeding and National program for Dairy development. The Rashtriya Gokul mission also intends to develop Gokul Gram cattle care centres in order to increase indigenous bovines of high genetic merit. It also aims to develop undistinguished cattle in care centres. As a part of "Rashtriya Gokul mission", a total of 14 Gokul Grams were planned to be set up across the country with the first one at Mathura. The 20th Livestock census data, however, revealed a drop in population of indigenous milch cows despite government efforts. On the other hand, exotic breeds saw a rise. The Government of India has also set up Rashtriya Kamdhenu Aayog (RKA) to function as a part of Rashtriya Gokul mission to promote indigenous breed of cows and income opportunities they provide. The RKA which functions under the Ministry of Animal husbandry, Dairying and Fishiries launched Kamdhenu-Gau Vigyan Prachar Prasar Examination in 2021 to infuse curiosity among indians regarding indigenous cow breeds. The exam was supposed to be conducted in four categories and 12 regional languages apart from Hindi and English and aimed at making materials related to cow science available.

=== National Animal Disease Control Program ===
The program was launched to eradicate the Foot and Mouth Disease (FMD) and Brucellosis. India has the largest population of cattle in the world, but due to prevalence of diseases within them, productivity remains low. This program aims to vaccinate 500 million livestock against FMD and 36 million female bovines annually against Brucellosis. The programme received 100% central funding for five years until 2024 to eradicate these two disease by 2030.

=== Dairy Entrepreneurship development scheme ===
The Department of Animal husbandry has launched this scheme along with National Bank for Agriculture and Rural Development (NABARD) to support dairy infrastructure projects with back ended capital subsidy of 25% of the project cost for the farmers of General category and of 33% for farmers of SC/ST category. More than one member of same family can also avail benefits of the scheme to set up separate dairy units, provided they set up their respective units at a distance of 500 metres from each other's units. The entrepreneurs must contribute 10% of the project cost. Further apart from farmers and individual entrepreneurs, self-help groups, and companies are also eligible for support under the scheme.

=== Animal Husbandry Infrastructure Development Fund ===
The Animal husbandry infrastructure development fund (AHIDF) is a 15,000 crore fund that was set up in 2020 to increase private sector investment in developing animal husbandry infrastructure with dairy plants, meat processing units and animal feed plants. It was set up by Government of India as a part of the COVID-19 stimulus package. The setting up of AHIDF preceded Dairy Infrastructure Development Fund, a 10,000 crore fund set up to enhance investment in dairy sector by cooperatives. However, amidst the government's drive to enhance the participation of private companies and MSMEs, the setting up of AHIDF was planned. The new fund was aimed to support Farmer producer organizations (FPOs), MSMEs, Section 8 companies, private companies and individual entrepreneurs.

=== E-Pashuhaat portal ===
It is a web portal which was launched to organise the livestock market in India. It provides information to the farmers and dairy entrepreneurs regarding feed and fodder of the livestock. It also eases the sale of bovine germplasm, embryos and frozen semen by providing information to the stakeholders involved. It also provides facilities for multichannel communication between the stakeholders and transportation facilities to make a deal successful.

=== Ensure portal ===
Under National livestock mission, the subsidy is provided to the farmers for activities like poultry, small ruminants and pig rearing. In order to track the payment of subsidy directly into the bank accounts of the farmers, Ministry of Agriculture launched "Ensure portal", which is developed by the NABARD and will be managed by DAHD. The portal will also provide information related to beneficiary and processing of applications. The portal has been launched under the component of the mission called Entrepreneurship Development & Employment Generation (EDEG).

== See also ==
- Pradhan Mantri Matsya Sampada Yojana
- Dairy in India
- Article 48 of the Constitution of India
