= Nilam Devi =

Indian politician from Bihar

Neelam Devi

Member of Bihar Legislative Assembly
- In office 6 November 2022 – 14 November 2025
- Preceded by: Anant Kumar Singh
- Succeeded by: Anant Kumar Singh
- Constituency: Mokama

Personal details
- Born: Neelam Kumari; 11 February 1971 (age 55) Patna, Bihar, India
- Party: Janata Dal (United) until 2026
- Spouse: Anant Kumar Singh
- Nickname: Nilu

Nilam Devi, also Neelam Devi (born 11 February 1971), is an Indian politician representing Mokama assembly constituency in the Bihar Legislative Assembly.

She was elected as a member of the Bihar Legislative Assembly in 2022 by-election, after disqualification of her predecessor (and also her husband) Anant Kumar Singh as an MLA. She contested the election through the political party Rashtriya Janta Dal.

She earlier fought from Munger Lok Sabha constituency in 2019 representing the national party Indian National Congress.

She was expelled from JD(U) along with her husband Anant Singh on 24 October 2026 for anti-party activity.

== Personal life ==
Neelam Devi is married to Anant Kumar Singh. She is educated up to class 8, and has four children.
