= Ministry of Panchayati Raj =

Government ministry of India

Ministry of Panchayati Raj transl. Ministry of Rural Local Bodies
- Branch of the Union of India

Agency overview
- Jurisdiction: Union of India
- Headquarters: New Delhi
- Annual budget: ₹1,190 crore (US$120 million) (2026-27 est.)
- Minister responsible: Mr. Lalan Singh, Cabinet Minister
- Deputy Minister responsible: Mr. S P Singh Baghel, Minister of State
- Website: www.panchayat.gov.in

The Ministry of Panchayati Raj (transl. Ministry of Rural Local Bodies) is a branch of the Union of India. The Ministry is in charge of the Panchayati Raj and Panchayati Raj Institutions. It was created in May-2004. The Ministry is headed by a Minister of Cabinet Rank / Minister of State and transfers grants to rural local bodies for civic programmes such as maintenance and construction of roads, pavements, bridges, drainage systems, parks, piped water supply, streetlights etc.

In 1993 the passage of the 73rd and 74th amendments to the Constitution of India, granted powers and functions to Local Self Governments (Panchayat at Village levels and Municipalities and Municipal Corporations in towns and large cities). As such the Panchayati raj may be seen as a third tier of government, below the central and state governments.

== Divisions ==
- e-Governance Division
- SWAMITVA Scheme and Vigilance Cell
- Establishment Division
- General Administration Division
- General Coordination Division
- Capacity Building Division
- Fiscal Devolution Division
- Policy (PRI & PESA) Division
- Integrated Finance Division
- Accounts and Audit Division
- Official Language Division
- Cash Section
- NIC Cell

== Functions ==
The Ministry is responsible for the work of advocacy for and monitoring of the implementation of Constitution 73rd Amendment Act the Provisions of the Panchayats (Extension to Scheduled Areas) Act 1996.

E-PANCHAYAT

As per the World Bank, "e-Government refers to the use by government agencies of information technologies (such as Wide Area Networks, the Internet, and mobile computing) that have the ability to transform relations with citizens, businesses, and other arms of government." Union of India (UIN), with an intention to transform the governance landscape by ensuring participation of citizens in policy making and providing ease of access to information to the citizens, introduced the National e-Governance Plan (NeGP) in 2006. The vision of the NeGP was to "Make all Government services accessible to the common man in his locality, through common service delivery outlets and ensure efficiency, transparency & reliability of such services at affordable costs to realise the basic needs of the common man." e- Panchayat is one of the Mission Mode Project (MMP), currently being implemented with a vision to empower and transform rural India.

As a first step towards formulating the project, the Ministry of Panchayati Raj constituted an Expert Group in June-2007 under the Chairmanship of Dr. B K Gairola, Director General, NIC, Union of India. The Expert Group was entrusted with the task of assessing the IT Programmes of Ministry of Panchayati Raj and recommending cost effective solutions along with the cost implications. Adopting a consultative approach, the Committee interacted with the States / UTs to assess the existing status of computerisation up to the Gram Panchayat level, including the initiatives undertaken by the State Governments. In order to understand the ground realities, the Committee conducted field visits to some of the Gram Panchayats in the selected rural areas where some IT initiatives had been undertaken. Inputs from eminent experts in the public and private sector were also taken into account as part of the consultative process. In essence, it found that while some computerisation efforts had already been made at Panchayat level by States like Gujarat, West Bengal, Karnataka, Kerala, Andhra Pradesh and Goa, these attempts were limited as they were driven by short-term goals and were unable to completely transform Panchayats due to lack of a holistic perspective. It was felt that a more comprehensive approach was required to make a cognisable impact on the functioning of the Panchayats for the benefit of the citizens. These recommendations formed the basis for the conceptualisation of e-Panchayat MMP.

The e-Panchayat project is a nationwide IT initiative introduced by the Ministry of Panchayati Raj to strengthen the functioning of Panchayati Raj Institutions (PRIs). It aims to automate processes across approximately 245,000 panchayats, covering planning, monitoring, implementation, budgeting, accounting, social audit, and the delivery of citizen services such as the issuance of certificates and licences. The project seeks to improve transparency, efficiency, and public participation in decision-making, implementation, and service delivery.

== Cabinet Ministers ==
- ^{†} Died in office

Portrait	Minister (Birth-Death) Constituency	Term of office			Political party	Ministry	Prime Minister
Portrait	Minister (Birth-Death) Constituency	From	To	Period	Political party	Ministry	Prime Minister
	Mani Shankar Aiyar (born 1941); MP for Mayiladuthurai	23 May 2004	22 May 2009	4 years, 364 days	Indian National Congress	Manmohan I	Manmohan Singh
	C. P. Joshi (born 1950); MP for Bhilwara	28 May 2009	19 January 2011	1 year, 236 days	Indian National Congress	Manmohan II	Manmohan Singh
	Vilasrao Deshmukh (1945–2012); Rajya Sabha MP for Maharashtra	19 January 2011	12 July 2011	174 days	Indian National Congress	Manmohan II	Manmohan Singh
	Kishore Chandra Deo (born 1947); MP for Aruku	12 July 2011	26 May 2014	2 years, 318 days	Indian National Congress	Manmohan II	Manmohan Singh
	Gopinath Munde (1949–2014); MP for Beed	27 May 2014	3 June 2014^{[†]}	7 days	Bharatiya Janata Party	Modi I	Narendra Modi
	Nitin Gadkari (born 1957); MP for Nagpur	4 June 2014	9 November 2014	158 days	Bharatiya Janata Party	Modi I	Narendra Modi
	Birender Singh (born 1946); Rajya Sabha MP for Haryana	9 November 2014	5 July 2016	1 year, 239 days	Bharatiya Janata Party	Modi I	Narendra Modi
	Narendra Singh Tomar (born 1957); MP for Gwalior (until 2019); MP for Morena (from 2019)	5 July 2016	30 May 2019	5 years, 2 days	Bharatiya Janata Party	Modi I	Narendra Modi
	Narendra Singh Tomar (born 1957); MP for Gwalior (until 2019); MP for Morena (from 2019)	31 May 2019	7 July 2021	5 years, 2 days	Bharatiya Janata Party	Modi II	Narendra Modi
	Giriraj Singh (born 1957); MP for Begusarai	7 July 2021	9 June 2024	2 years, 338 days	Bharatiya Janata Party	Modi II	Narendra Modi
	Lalan Singh (born 1957); MP for Munger	9 June 2024	Incumbent	2 years, 132 days	Janata Dal (United)	Modi III	Narendra Modi

== Ministers of State ==
Portrait	Minister (Birth-Death) Constituency	Term of office			Political party	Ministry	Prime Minister
Portrait	Minister (Birth-Death) Constituency	From	To	Period	Political party	Ministry	Prime Minister
	Upendra Kushwaha (born 1960); MP for Karakat	26 May 2014	9 November 2014	167 days	Rashtriya Lok Samta Party	Modi I	Narendra Modi
	Nihalchand (born 1971); MP for Ganganagar	9 November 2014	5 July 2016	1 year, 239 days	Bharatiya Janata Party	Modi I	Narendra Modi
	Parshottam Rupala (born 1954); Rajya Sabha MP for Gujarat	5 July 2016	30 May 2019	2 years, 329 days	Bharatiya Janata Party	Modi I	Narendra Modi
	Kapil Patil (born 1961); MP for Bhiwandi	7 July 2021	9 June 2024	2 years, 338 days	Bharatiya Janata Party	Modi II	Narendra Modi
	S. P. Singh Baghel (born 1960); MP for Agra	10 June 2024	Incumbent	2 years, 132 days	Bharatiya Janata Party	Modi III	Narendra Modi

== See also ==
- National Panchayati Raj Day
- E-Panchayat Mission Mode Project
