= Fourth Nitish Kumar ministry =

Government of Bihar, India in 2015

- 35th Ministry of Bihar
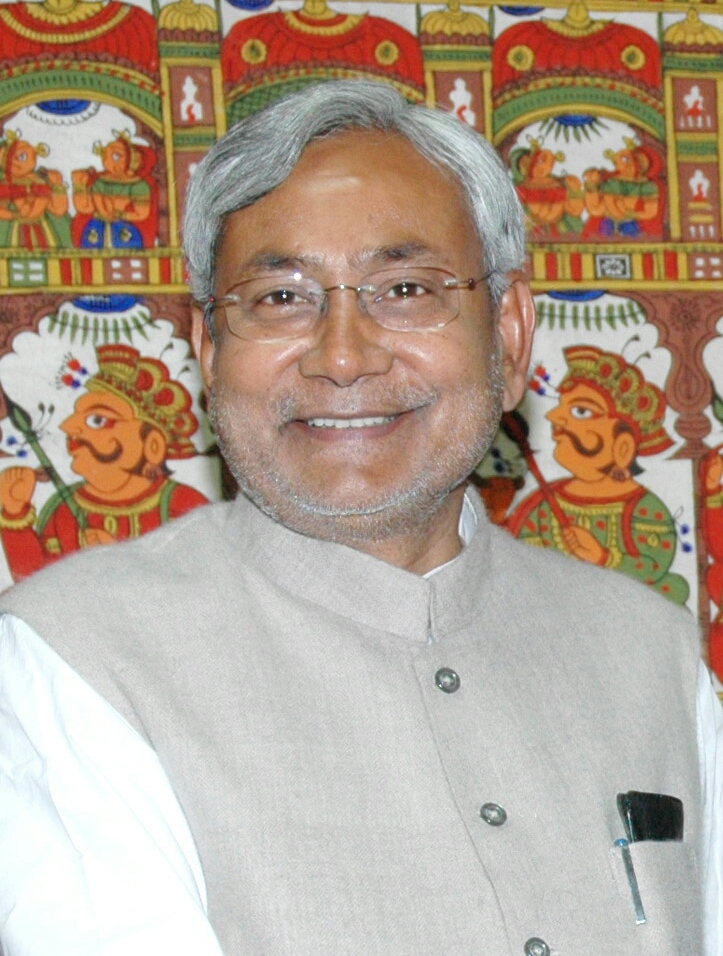
- Nitish Kumar
- Date formed: 22 February 2015
- Date dissolved: 20 November 2015

People and organisations
- Governor: Keshari Nath Tripathi
- Chief Minister: Nitish Kumar
- No. of ministers: 23 (including CM)
- Member parties: JD(U)
- Status in legislature: Supported by RJD & Indian National Congress ( Mahagathbandhan), cabinet composed solely of JD(U)
- Opposition party: BJP
- Opposition leader: Sushil Kumar Modi (BJP), Council; Nand Kishore Yadav (BJP), Assembly

History
- Election: 2010
- Legislature terms: 8 months and 29 days
- Predecessor: Jitan Ram Manjhi ministry
- Successor: Fifth Nitish Kumar ministry

After Jitan Ram Manjhi resigned on 20 February 2015, Nitish Kumar was again sworn in as Chief Minister on 22 February 2015. This was his fourth term in office. JD(U) was able to comfortably form the government and was supported in the legislature by the Rashtriya Janata Dal and the Indian National Congress. The cabinet of ministers was composed entirely of JD(U) members. This interim ministry continued until the 2015 Bihar Legislative Assembly election took place, after which the Fifth Nitish Kumar ministry was formed.

== Council of Ministers ==
Portfolio	Minister	Took office	Left office	Party
Chief Minister; Home; General Administration; Cabinet Secretariat; Vigilance; Election; Other departments not allocated to any Minister	Nitish Kumar	22 February 2015	20 November 2015	JD(U)
Minister of Water Resources	Vijay Kumar Chaudhary	22 February 2015	20 November 2015	JD(U)
Finance; Commercial Taxes	Bijendra Prasad Yadav	22 February 2015	20 November 2015	JD(U)
Minister of Rural Works	Ramai Ram	22 February 2015	20 November 2015	JD(U)
Minister of Health & Family Welfare	Damodar Rout	22 February 2015	20 November 2015	JD(U)
Minister of Revenue & Land Reforms; Minister of Law	Narendra Narayan Yadav	22 February 2015	20 November 2015	JD(U)
Minister of Education	P. K. Shahi	22 February 2015	20 November 2015	JD(U)
Minister of Industries	Shyam Rajak	22 February 2015	20 November 2015	JD(U)
Minister of Rural Development	Awadhesh Prasad Kushwaha	22 February 2015	20 November 2015	JD(U)
Minister of Food & Consumer Protection	Leshi Singh	22 February 2015	20 November 2015	JD(U)
Minister of Transport	Dulal Chandra Goswami	22 February 2015	20 November 2015	JD(U)
Minister of Parliamentary Affairs	Rajiv Ranjan Singh	22 February 2015	20 November 2015	JD(U)
Minister of EBC Welfare	Shrawan Kumar	22 February 2015	20 November 2015	JD(U)
Minister of Co-operative	Ram Lakhan Ram Raman	22 February 2015	20 November 2015	JD(U)
Minister of Minor Irrigation	Ramdhani Singh	22 February 2015	20 November 2015	JD(U)
Minister of Science & Technology	Jai Kumar Singh	22 February 2015	20 November 2015	JD(U)
Minister of Mines & Geology	Manoj Kumar Singh	22 February 2015	20 November 2015	JD(U)
Minister of Minority Welfare	Javed Iqbal Ansari	22 February 2015	20 November 2015	JD(U)
Minister of Tourism	Bima Bharti	22 February 2015	20 November 2015	JD(U)
Minister of Art, Culture & Youth Affairs	Ranju Geeta	22 February 2015	20 November 2015	JD(U)
Minister of Animal & Fish Resources	Baidyanath Sahni	22 February 2015	20 November 2015	JD(U)
Minister of Urban Development & Housing	Vinod Singh Yadav	22 February 2015	20 November 2015	JD(U)
Minister of BC & EBC Welfare; Minister of Minority Welfare	Naushad Alam	22 February 2015	20 November 2015	JD(U)
