= Manjhi ministry =

Government of Bihar, India (2014–15)

- 34th Ministry of Bihar
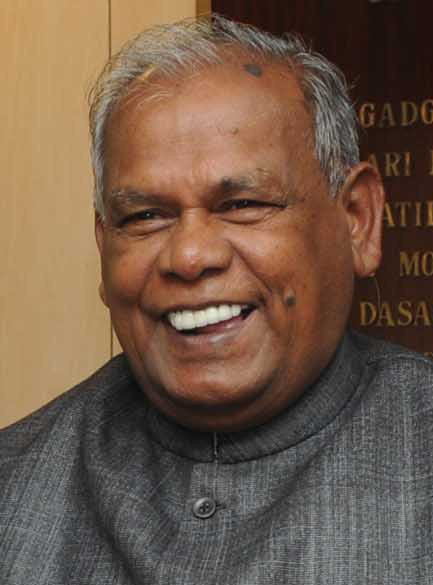
- Jitan Ram Manjhi; Hon'ble Chief Minister of Bihar
- Date formed: 20 May 2014
- Date dissolved: 22 February 2015

People and organisations
- Head of state: Governor; D. Y. Patil
- Head of government: Jitan Ram Manjhi
- No. of ministers: 24
- Member parties: JD(U)
- Status in legislature: Coalition
- Opposition party: BJP; RJD
- Opposition leader: (20 May 2014 onwards): Nand Kishore Yadav (Assembly); Sushil Kumar Modi (Council)

History
- Election: 2010
- Legislature term: 5 years
- Predecessor: Third Nitish Kumar ministry
- Successor: Fourth Nitish Kumar ministry

This is a list of ministers from Jitan Ram Manjhi's cabinet, starting on 20 May 2014.

Following the JD(U)'s poor showing in the 2014 general election, Nitish Kumar accepted responsibility for the defeat and resigned from the position of Chief Minister. Jitan Ram Manjhi, the Minister for SC and ST welfare in Nitish's cabinet, replaced him as the 23rd Chief Minister of Bihar.

== Council of Ministers ==
Portfolio	Minister	Took office	Left office	Party
Chief Minister; Home; General Administration; Cabinet Secretariat; Vigilance; Election; Other departments not allocated to any Minister	Jitan Ram Manjhi	20 May 2014	22 February 2015	JD(U)
Finance; Commercial Taxes; Environment & Forest; Minister of Energy; Minister of Building Construction; Minister of Transport	Bijendra Prasad Yadav	20 May 2014	22 February 2015	JD(U)
Minister of Water Resources; Minister of Information & Public Relations	Vijay Chaudhary	20 May 2014	22 February 2015	JD(U)
Minister of Parliamentary Affairs	Shrawan Kumar	20 May 2014	22 February 2015	JD(U)
Minister of Road Construction	Lalan Singh	20 May 2014	22 February 2015	JD(U)
Minister of Agriculture; Minister of Minor Irrigation	Narendra Singh	20 May 2014	22 February 2015	JD(U)
Minister of Revenue & Land Reforms; Minister of Law	Narendra Narayan Yadav	20 May 2014	22 February 2015	JD(U)
Minister of Health & Family Welfare	Damodar Rawat	20 May 2014	22 February 2015	JD(U)
Minister of Panchayat Raj	Vinod Prasad Yadav	20 May 2014	22 February 2015	JD(U)
Minister of BC & EBC Welfare; Minister of Minority Welfare	Naushad Alam	20 May 2014	22 February 2015	JD(U)
Minister of Rural Works	Ramai Ram	20 May 2014	22 February 2015	JD(U)
Minister of Industry; Minister of Information Technology; Minister of Science & Technology	Jai Kumar Singh	20 May 2014	22 February 2015	JD(U)
Minister of Disaster Management; Minister of Sugarcane Industries	Leshi Singh	20 May 2014	22 February 2015	JD(U)
Minister of SC/ST Welfare; Minister of Food & Consumer Protection	Shyam Rajak	20 May 2014	22 February 2015	JD(U)
Minister of Urban Development & Housing	Samrat Choudhary	20 May 2014	22 February 2015	JD(U)
Minister of Education; Minister of Transport	Brishin Patel	20 May 2014	22 February 2015	JD(U)
Minister of Planning & Development	Mahachandra Prasad Singh	20 May 2014	22 February 2015	JD(U)
Minister of Social Welfare	Parveen Amanullah	20 May 2014	22 February 2015	JD(U)
Minister of Rural Development; Minister of Co-operative	Nitish Mishra	20 May 2014	22 February 2015	JD(U)
Minister of Mines & Geology	Bhagwan Singh Kushwaha	20 May 2014	22 February 2015	JD(U)
Minister of Animal & Fish Resources	Baidyanath Sahni	20 May 2014	22 February 2015	JD(U)
Minister of Labour Resources	Dulal Chandra Goswami	20 May 2014	22 February 2015	JD(U)
Minister of Art, Culture & Youth Affairs	Ranju Geeta	20 May 2014	22 February 2015	JD(U)
Minister of Tourism	Bima Bharti	20 May 2014	22 February 2015	JD(U)
