= Chandan Singh (politician) =

Indian politician

Member of Parliament (India), Lok Sabha
- In office 23 May 2019 – 4 June 2024
- Preceded by: Giriraj Singh
- Succeeded by: Vivek Thakur
- Constituency: Nawada

Personal details
- Born: 12 February 1983 (age 43) Munger, Bihar, India
- Party: Lok Janshakti Party
- Spouse: Rakhi Sharma
- Relations: Surajbhan Singh, elder brother; Veena Devi, sister in law
- Children: 1 Son and 1 daughter
- Education: Bachelor of Arts, Bhagalpur University
- Occupation: Businessman and politician

Chandan Singh is an Indian politician from Bihar. He was elected to the Lok Sabha, the lower house of the Parliament of India from Nawada Parliamentary constituency in the 2019 Indian general election. He contested as a member of the Lok Janshakti Party. He is member of Standing Committee on Industry and Consultative Committee, Ministry of Road Transport and Highways in Indian Parliament.

He was one of the 5 MP of LJP who replaced Chirag Paswan with Pashupati Nath Paras as LJP party president.

== See also ==
- Giriraj Singh
- Kapildev Singh
- Surajbhan Singh
- Pashupati Kumar Paras
- Lok Janshakti Party
