= Pradhan Mantri Matsya Sampada Yojana =

Initiative by Government of India

The Pradhan Mantri Matsya Sampada Yojana (PMMSY) (http://pmmsy.dof.gov.in/) is an initiative launched by the Government of India to establish a comprehensive framework and reduce infrastructural gaps in the fisheries sector. The scheme was announced by the Finance Minister, Nirmala Sitharaman while presenting the Union budget for 2019–20 in the parliament of India on 5 July 2019. The government intends to place India in the first place in fish production and processing by implementing Neeli Kranti (transl. Blue Revolution). This scheme is in line with governments aim to double the farmers' income by 2022–23.

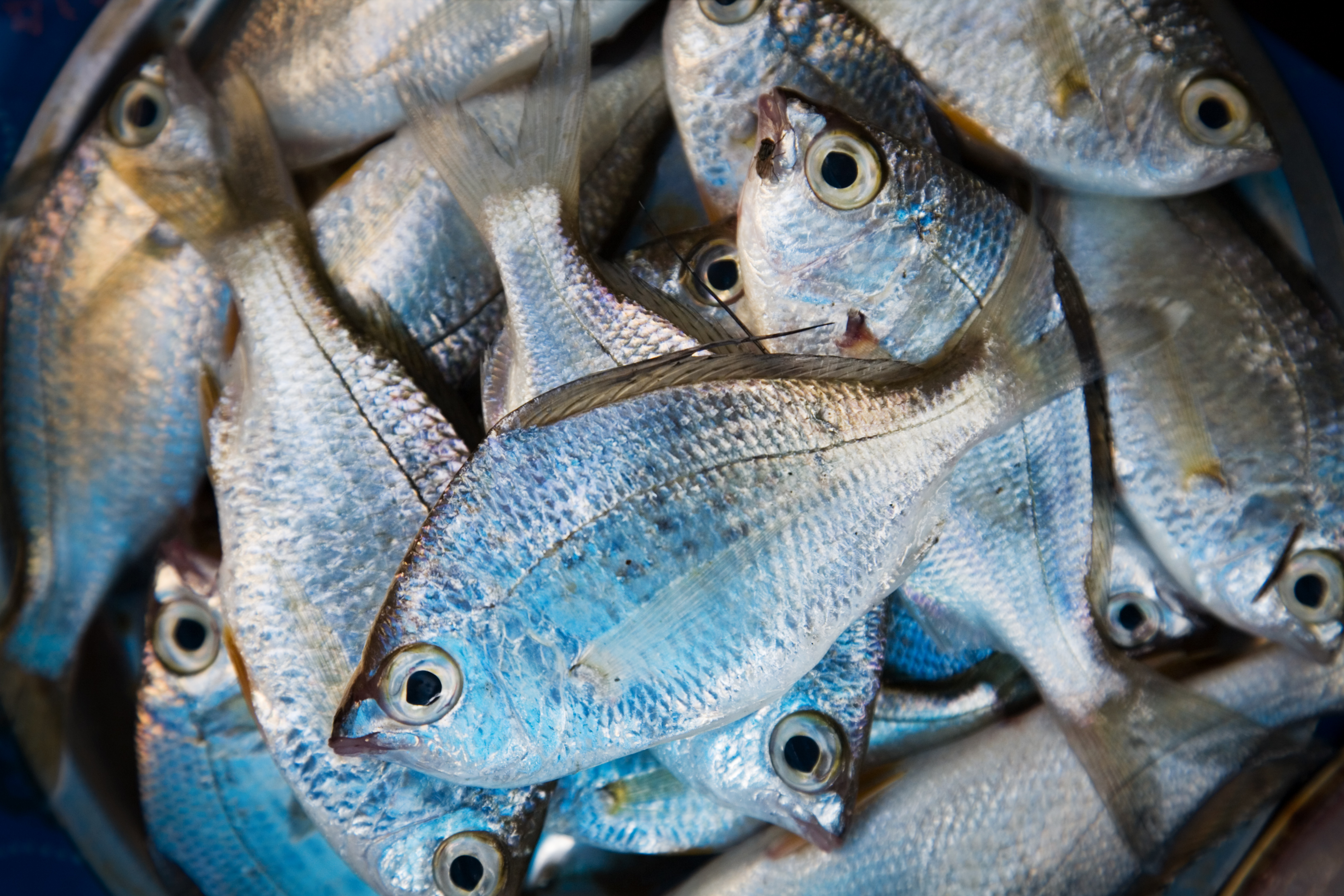
Pradhan Mantri Matsya Sampada Yojana aims to reduce infrastructural gap in the fisheries sector.

The policy envisages to integrate all the fishermen with agricultural farmers and provide all the facilities available through various farmer welfare schemes to the fishermen. A new dedicated department of Fisheries was constituted in a newly carved out Ministry of Fisheries, Animal Husbandry and Dairying to implement this and other policy initiatives of the government.

== Financial assistance ==
In the Union Budget for 2019–20, the Finance Minister announced ₹804.75 crore (equivalent to ₹947 crore or US$110 million in 2023) to incentivize and promote processing in the fisheries sector for the Financial year 2019–20 through the newly formed Ministry of Fisheries, Animal Husbandry and Dairying. During the Budget speech, the finance minister asserted: "fishing and fishermen communities are closely aligned with farming and are crucial to rural India." The Economic Survey of India for the year 2018–19 had stressed on allied sectors and focused mainly on enhancing rural economy by strengthening Animal husbandry and Fisheries. Apart from this, the government had earlier set aside ₹7,552 crore (equivalent to ₹89 billion or US$1.1 billion in 2023) in the Fisheries and Aquaculture Infrastructure Development Fund (FIDF), which was intended to be utilized in creating both inland and overseas fishery infrastructure in the country. The government had set a target of 20 tonnes for fish production through the Blue Revolution by 2022–23.

While announcing the stimulus package in the backdrop of the economic slowdown caused by the recent COVID-19 pandemic in India, the Finance Minister announced ₹20,000 crore (equivalent to ₹240 billion or US$2.8 billion in 2023) outlay to enhance the inland fisheries through Matsya Sampada Yojana. Out of this ₹11,000 crore (equivalent to ₹130 billion or US$1.5 billion in 2023) shall be utilized in promoting inland, marine fisheries, and aquacare and the remaining ₹9,000 crore (equivalent to ₹110 billion or US$1.3 billion in 2023) shall be deployed for building fishery infrastructure like harbors and cold storage chains. The government has targeted at increasing fish production to 700 thousand tonnes and help increase India's export to 1 trillion. The financial aid is also intended to provide employment opportunities to 5.5 million people in the next five years.

== Benefits ==
- Financial help is given to build fishing infrastructure like harbors, fish landing areas, fish markets, fish feed facilities, fish seed farms, and fish processing facilities.
- Financial help for fish farmers: The program offers money to fish farmers for building ponds, cages, hatcheries, and nurseries, and for setting up aeration systems and other equipment.
- The program provides money to support the management of fisheries by using scientific methods, making management plans, and creating information systems.
- Fish farmers can apply for a subsidy linked to credit, which aims to encourage them to start fish farms as a business.
- Support for marketing and exporting fish products: The program provides money to set up cold chains, fish processing facilities, and packaging facilities to help export fish products.
