= Manish Kumar Verma =

Former IAS, JDU National General Secretary and politician

National General Secretary of the Janata Dal (United)

Personal details
- Born: Biharsharif, Bihar, India
- Party: Janata Dal (United),
- Education: (B.Tech.) IIT Delhi

Manish Kumar Verma (born 1 April 1974) is an Indian politician and retired IAS officer, currently serving as the National General Secretary of the Janata Dal (United). He is a Civil Engineering graduate from IIT Delhi and is a 2000-batch Odisha-cadre IAS officer who previously served as the District Magistrate of Patna and Purnia. He took voluntary retirement in 2018 and joined JD(U) in 2024, rising to a key organizational role and as an additional advisor to the Bihar Chief Minister Nitish Kumar. He played a significant role in JD(U)’s campaign for the 2024 Indian general election, contributing to the party's success in winning 12 seats.

== Early life ==
Manish Kumar Verma was born in the village of Biharsharif, in the Indian state of Bihar. His father was Ashok Verma, a prominent doctor. Verma had his primary education from a government school in Biharsharif. He studied at a school in Patna before completing his B.Tech in Civil Engineering from IIT Delhi.

== Career ==
Verma worked with the Indian Oil Corporation before cracking the UPSC in 2000. He started his career with IAS in Odisha Cadre. He worked with Nitish Kumar in the Bihar electricity department. After that he took a special post as CM Advisory in Bihar CM Nitish Kumar Government. After that he joined JDU. He took charge as National General Secretary of JDU. He held rallies and supported volunteers in the Lok Sabha election in 2024.

He worked in the electricity department of the Indian state of Bihar. He helped implement the Bihar electricity reforms. He was elected as a member of Bihar Disaster Management. Manish Kumar Verma meet party volunteers and do district wise visits of Bihar. He is also share these details on social media via Facebook,Instagram, and X.
