= Surajbhan Singh =

Indian politician

Member of Parliament, Lok Sabha
- In office 2004–2009
- Preceded by: Ram Jeevan Singh
- Succeeded by: constituency abolished
- Constituency: Balia (Bihar)

Member of Bihar Legislative Assembly
- In office 2000–2004
- Preceded by: Dilip Singh
- Succeeded by: Anant Kumar Singh
- Constituency: Mokama

Acting President of the Lok Janshakti Party
- In office 15 June 2021 – 17 June 2021
- Preceded by: Chirag Kumar Paswan
- Succeeded by: Pashupati Kumar Paras

Personal details
- Born: 5 March 1965 (age 61) Mokama, Bihar, India
- Party: Rashtriya Janata Dal (2025-present)
- Other political affiliations: Rashtriya Lok Janshakti Party (2021-2025); Lok Janshakti Party (2004-2021); Independent (2000-2004)
- Spouse: Veena Devi
- Relations: Chandan Singh (younger brother)

Surajbhan Singh (born 5 March 1965) is an Indian politician and former Member of Parliament. He was elected to the Lok Sabha from Bihar contesting on a ticket from Lok Janshakti Party (LJP). Currently he is debarred from contesting due to conviction in the Rami Singh farmer murder case.

== Personal life ==
Singh was born on 5 March 1965 in Mokama into a poor farming family. He had two brothers. His wife, Veena Devi, was an MP from Munger parliamentary constituency on a Lok Janshakti Party. His son Ashutosh died in a car accident on Greater Noida Expressway on 27 October 2018.

== Political career ==
He started his career in politics by contesting Assembly election against Dilip Singh, the sitting Minister in Government of Bihar and the elder brother of politician Anant Kumar Singh in 2000 and defeated him by a huge margin. At the time of fighting the 2000 elections, police records credited him with 26 criminal cases ranging across Bihar and Uttar Pradesh. After he was elected an independent MLA from the Mokama Assembly constituency (Patna district) then became MP of Balia, Bihar, on a LJP ticket. In 2009, he is convicted in Brij Behari Prasad Murder Case but in 2014 he along 9 accused had been acquitted by the High Court. He is debarred from contesting due to conviction in the Rami Singh murder case of 2008.

In October 2025, Singh joined Rashtriya Janata Dal after resigning from Rashtriya Lok Janshakti Party where he was a member for four years.

== Murder trial ==
Singh was alleged to have shot and killed Rami Singh, a resident of Madhurapur village in Begusarai district on 16 January 1992. On 24 June 2008, he was found guilty by a Bihar court. After that he went to jail. On Sunday, 10 May 2009 unidentified men shot dead the main witness Naga Singh and his grandson near Barauni in Begusarai.

== See also ==
- Ritlal Yadav
- Pradeep Mahto
- Vijay Kumar Shukla
- Prakash Shukla
- Rajan Tiwari
