= Paresh Dhanani =

Indian politician

Leader of Opposition in Gujarat Legislative Assembly
- In office 6 January 2018 – 4 December 2021
- Preceded by: Mohan Rathwa
- Succeeded by: Sukhram Rathva

Member of Gujarat Legislative Assembly for Amreli
- In office 20 December 2012 – 2022
- Preceded by: Dileepbhai Sanghani

Member of Gujarat Legislative Assembly for Amreli
- In office 2002–2007
- Succeeded by: Dileepbhai Sanghani

Personal details
- Born: Paresh Kumar Dhiraj Lal Dhanani; 15 August 1976 (age 49) Amreli, Gujarat, India
- Party: INC
- Spouse: VarshaBen
- Children: 2 daughters (Sanskruti, Pranali)
- Occupation: Politician, farmer

Paresh Kumar Dhiraj Lal Dhanani is an Indian politician from Gujarat associated with the Indian National Congress. He is the former leader of opposition in the Gujarat Legislative Assembly. First time he was elected as an MLA from Amreli in 2002 against Purushottam Khodabhai Madhabhai Rupala. He earlier represented Amreli from 2002 to 2007.

He completed B. Com. from Saurashtra University in April 2000.
