= Krishi Bhavan =

Krishi Bhavan is the government body in India undertaking by Department of Agriculture in various states. Krishi Bhavan deals with the formulation and implementation of various state government programmes to augment production of both food crops and cash crops in the state.
