= E-Panchayat Mission Mode Project =

Indian government project

E-Panchayat Project,

== Background ==
During 2004, the MoPR organized several Round Table meetings of State Ministers of Panchayati Raj. The focus was to implement Part IX (Panchayat) of the Constitution and PESA Panchayats (Extension to Scheduled Areas) Act 1996. During the 7th Round Table meeting, the issue of Information Technology for Panchayats was discussed, and the usage of IT in Panchayats was recommended on several counts. In 2005, the National Advisory Council (NAC) suggested to the Government to take up a "National IT for Panchayati Raj Programme", “which would include setting up a nationally networked/ computerised system including Treasuries to monitor fund flows/facilitate devolution. It had recommended that the Union Government ought to launch a Fund for this and operationalise this recommendation in one year. It had also urged providing back-end support at all levels of PRIs/ PR Departments for operationalising the computerization of services.” A year later, the National e-Governance Plan was approved by the Cabinet and the ePanchayats project was one of them.

== Transformation ==
Computing Infrastructure and 11 Core Software Applications will be installed at the PRIs. There will be improved transparency in the workings of the panchayat with Panchayat data made available on the Internet. Further certain services will be provided such as pension, house tax, and birth and death certificates issuance. Additionally, there will be Business Process Reegineering of the services provided by Panchayats so that the process of receiving any demanded service is greatly simplified. As a result of this, the scenario at the Panchayats is expected to be transformed.
