= Mokama =

Mokama Mokma or Mokameh
- town
- Interactive map of Mokama
- Location in Bihar, India
- Coordinates: 25°23′23.28″N 85°55′08.75″E
- Country: india
- State: Bihar
- Region: Magadh
- District: Patna

Government
  - Type: Municipal Council
  - Body: mayor, gram panchayat (in village area)
- Elevation: 48 m (157 ft)

Population (2011)
  - Total: 202,411

Languages
  - Official: Hindi, and Magahi
- Time zone: UTC+5:30 (IST)
- PIN: 803301,803302,803303
- Telephone code: +91-6132
- Vehicle registration: br-01
- Sex ratio: 1000/892 ♂/♀
- Literacy: 96.4%
- Lok Sabha constituency: Munger, mokama vidhan sabha
- Vidhan Sabha constituency: Mokama(183)
- Climate: ETh (Köppen)
- Precipitation: 1,000 millimetres (39 in)

Mokama is a town and a municipal council in Patna district in the Indian state of Bihar. It is located 90 km (56 mi) east of Patna on the southern banks of the river Ganges. Mokama is the connecting town of north and south Bihar and has 2nd highest amount of lentil production in India. It emerged as an industrial area in State of Bihar after independence. It is one of the most important towns in the district of Patna.

== Indian independence movement ==
The place where the revolutionary freedom fighter Prafulla Chaki was martyred is marked by a shaheed gate. People commemorate the anniversary of his death every year. Lalldin Saheb is yet another well known freedom fighter from Mokama who contributed in freedom struggle and was sentenced to jail during British rule. He worked for the welfare of the people of Mokama throughout his life. Had major contribution in reopening the Bharat Wagon Engineering Company of Mokama that is source of income of thousands of families.

== Transport ==
Mokama is connected to all the major cities of India by rail and road. Hathidah is the junction point of NH 80 and NH 31. Mokama Junction is the railway which is one of the important station in patna-Howrah Main line . Mokama is also connected with https://iwai.nic.in/waterways/national-waterways/national-waterways-1

== Demographics ==
As of 2011, Mokama had a population of 84,129. Males constituted 52.2% of the population and females 47.8%. 94.34% of the population were Hindus, with the remaining 5.66% from ethnic minorities. 5.11% of the population were Muslims. male literacy was around 99% while the female literacy was 93.8%. 8,995 people were aged 0 to 6, constituting 14.82% of the population. The literacy rate of 72.79% was higher than the state average of 61.80%. The female sex ratio was 880 against the state average of 918. Moreover, the child sex ratio in Mokama was 869 compared to the state average of 935.

== Villages ==
- Mokama Ghat
- Aunta
- Lakhanchand
- Ghoswari
- Hatidha, Maranchi, Tajpur

And much more

== Notable people ==
- Kartikeya Singh, former Minister of Law of Bihar
- Surajbhan Singh, Strongest Indian politician and former MP from Baliya & MlA from Mokama . He defeated Dilip singh who was minister in Bihar Govt.
- VINA DEVI Wife of Surajbhan Singh & Former MP from Munger Lok Sabha
