= Veena Devi (born 1976) =

Indian politician

Member of parliament, Lok Sabha
- In office 16 May 2014 – 23 May 2019
- Preceded by: Rajiv Ranjan Singh
- Succeeded by: Lalan Singh
- Constituency: Munger

Personal details
- Born: 5 November 1976 (age 49) Dularpur, Begusarai, Bihar, India
- Party: Rashtriya Janata Dal
- Spouse: Surajbhan Singh
- Occupation: Politician

Veena Devi (born 5 November 1976) is an Indian politician from the Rashtriya Janata Dal. She has served as the Member of parliament of the 16th Lok Sabha for Munger constituency in Bihar. Her husband is the don-turned-politician Surajbhan Singh. Her son Ashutosh, died in a car accident in 2018.
