= Giriraj Singh =

Indian politician (born 1952)

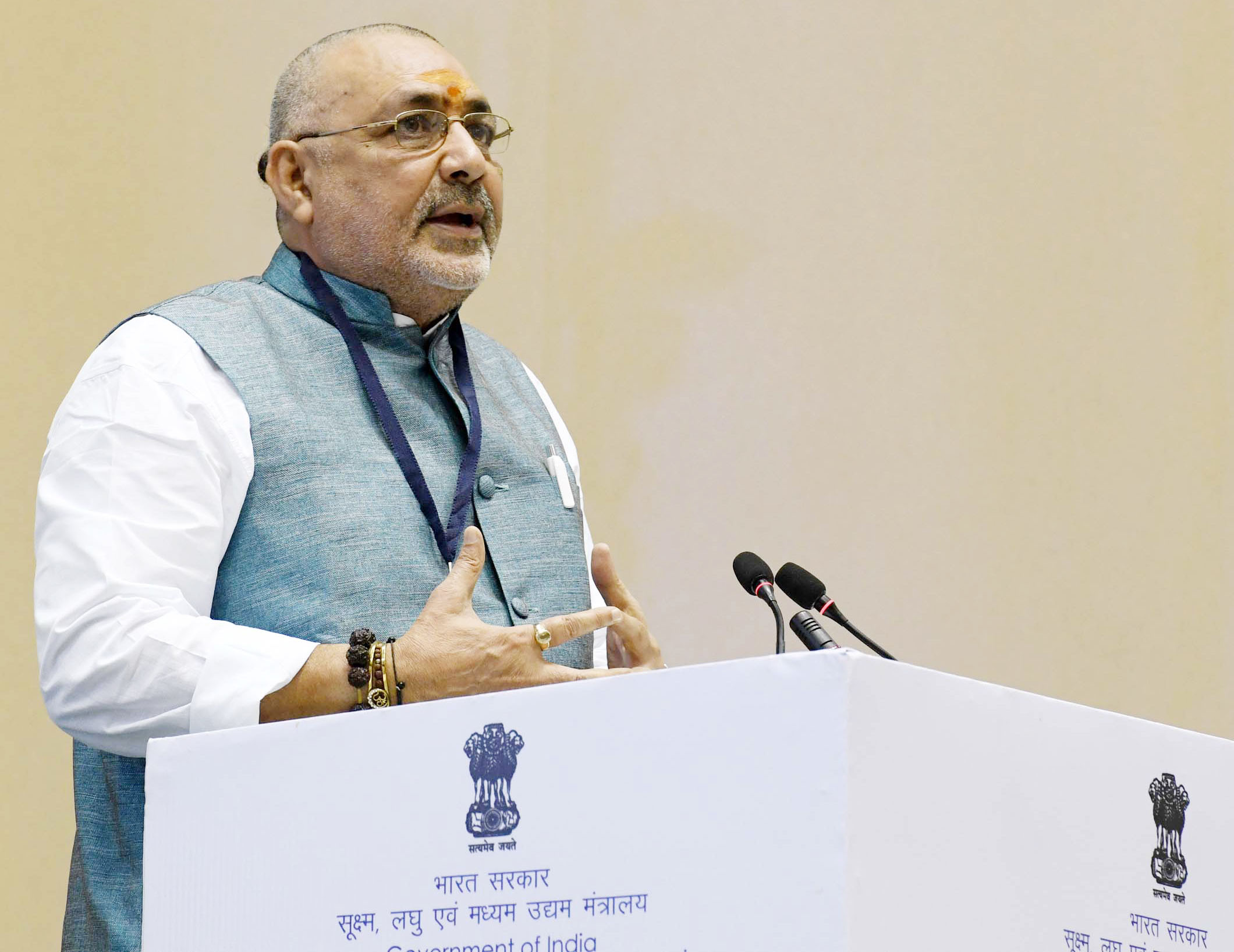
- Singh in 2021

21st Union Minister of Textiles
- Incumbent
- Assumed office 10 June 2024
- President: Droupadi Murmu
- Prime Minister: Narendra Modi
- Preceded by: Piyush Goyal

Union Minister of Rural Development
- In office 7 July 2021 – 10 June 2024
- Prime Minister: Narendra Modi
- Preceded by: Narendra Singh Tomar
- Succeeded by: Shivraj Singh Chouhan

Union Minister of Animal Husbandry, Dairying and Fisheries
- In office 30 May 2019 – 7 July 2021
- Prime Minister: Narendra Modi
- Preceded by: Office established
- Succeeded by: Parshottam Rupala

Union Minister of State (Independent Charge) for Micro, Small and Medium Enterprises
- In office 3 September 2017 – 30 May 2019
- Prime Minister: Narendra Modi
- Preceded by: Kalraj Mishra
- Succeeded by: Nitin Gadkari

Union Minister of State for Micro, Small and Medium Enterprises
- In office 9 November 2014 – 3 September 2017 Serving with Haribhai Parthibhai Chaudhary (from 5 July 2016)
- Prime Minister: Narendra Modi
- Minister: Kalraj Mishra

Member of Parliament, Lok Sabha
- Incumbent
- Assumed office 23 May 2019
- Preceded by: Bhola Singh
- Constituency: Begusarai, Bihar
- In office 16 May 2014 – 23 May 2019
- Preceded by: Bhola Singh
- Succeeded by: Chandan Singh
- Constituency: Nawada, Bihar

Minister of Animal Husbandry & Fisheries of Bihar
- In office 26 November 2010 – 16 June 2013
- Chief Minister: Nitish Kumar
- Preceded by: Ramnarayan Mandal

Minister of Cooperation of Bihar
- In office 18 April 2008 – 26 November 2010
- Chief Minister: Nitish Kumar
- Preceded by: Ramji Das Rishidev
- Succeeded by: Ramadhar Singh

Member of Bihar Legislative Council
- In office 7 May 2002 – 6 May 2014
- Constituency: elected by Legislative Assembly members

Personal details
- Born: Shandilya Giriraj Singh; 8 September 1952 (age 74) Barahiya, Bihar, India
- Party: Bharatiya Janata Party
- Spouse: Uma Sinha
- Children: 1
- Education: Magadh University
- Occupation: Politician
- Website: girirajsingh.in

Giriraj Singh (born 8 September 1952) is an Indian politician who is serving as the 21st Minister of Textiles since 2024. He is the Member of Parliament from the Begusarai Loksabha constituency in 17th and 18th Lok Sabha. He has also formerly served as Minister of Cooperative, Animal Husbandry and Fisheries Resources Development in the Government of Bihar.

== Personal life ==
Giriraj Singh was born in Barahiya town in Lakhisarai district of Bihar to Ramavtar Singh and Tara Devi. He graduated from Magadh University in 1971. He is married to Uma Sinha and has a daughter.

== Political career ==
Singh was a member of the Bihar Legislative Council from 2002 to May 2014. He served in the government of Bihar as Co-Operative Minister from 2005 to 2010 and as Animal Husbandry minister from 2010 to 2013. He was a member of the Bihar State Bharatiya Janata Party's 16-member state election committee and a State Minister (independent charge) of the "Ministry of Micro Small and Medium Enterprises ", MP from Nawada Constituency (2014 Indian General Election).

In May 2019, he became the cabinet minister of the newly formed Ministry of Animal Husbandry, Dairying and Fisheries after defeating CPI candidate Kanhaiya Kumar in the 2019 Indian general election.

In July 2021, he became Minister of Rural Development and Minister of Panchayati Raj in Second Modi ministry after the cabinet reshuffle replacing Narendra Singh Tomar.

In the Lok Sabha election 2024, Singh has won from Begusarai Lok Sabha constituency for the second time, defeating Awadhesh Kumar Rai by 81.480 votes. Singh took charge as the Minister of Textiles on 11 June.

== See also ==
- List of politicians from Bihar
- Kapildeo Singh
- Bhola Singh
- Third Modi ministry

Lok Sabha
Preceded by Bhola Singh	Member of Parliament for Nawada; 2014 – 2019	Succeeded by Chandan Singh
Preceded by Bhola Singh	Member of Parliament for Begusarai; 2019 – present	Succeeded by Incumbent
Political offices
Preceded by Kalraj Mishra	Minister of Micro, Small and Medium Enterprises; 3 September 2017 – 24 May 2019; Ministers of State (Independent charge)	Succeeded by Nitin Gadkari
Preceded by Ministry Created	Minister of Animal Husbandry, Dairying and Fisheries; 30 May 2019 – 7 July 2021	Succeeded by Parshottam Rupala
Preceded by Narendra Singh Tomar	Minister of Panchayati Raj; 7 July 2021 – 9 June 2024	Succeeded by Lalan Singh
Preceded by Narendra Singh Tomar	Minister of Rural Development; 7 July 2021 – 9 June 2024	Succeeded by Shivraj Singh Chouhan
Preceded by Piyush Goyal	Minister of Textiles; 10 June 2024 – present	Succeeded by Incumbent
