= Shyam Sunder Singh Dheeraj =

Indian politician

Working President Bihar Pradesh Congress Committee
- Incumbent
- Assumed office 22 September 2018

Personal details
- Political party: Indian National Congress

Shyam Sunder Singh Dheeraj was a Minister in Bihar Government and member of the Bihar Legislative Assembly. He was also a working president of Bihar Pradesh (state) Congress Committee.
