= Ministry of Fisheries, Animal Husbandry and Dairying =

Government ministry of India

- Branch of Government of India

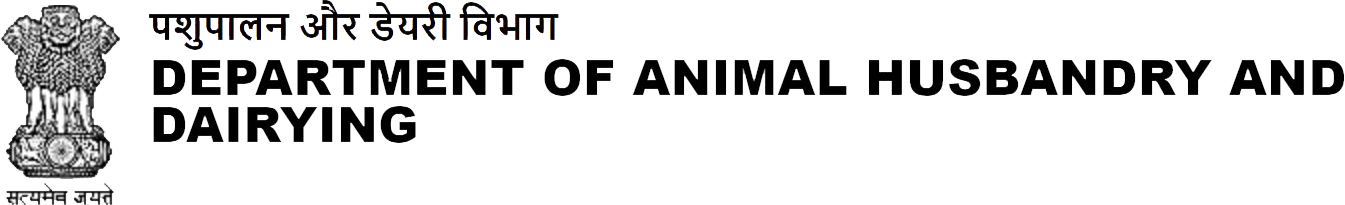
- Ministry of Fisheries, Animal Husbandry & Dairying

Agency overview
- Formed: 31 May 2019; 7 years ago
- Jurisdiction: Government of India
- Annual budget: ₹8,915.26 crore (US$930 million) (2026-27 est)
- Minister responsible: Lalan Singh, Minister of Fisheries, Animal Husbandry and Dairying
- Deputy Minister responsible: S. P. Singh Baghel, Minister of State
- Website: www.dahd.gov.in#gsc.tab=0; www.dof.gov.in

The Ministry of Fisheries, Animal Husbandry and Dairying is a ministry of the Government of India responsible for the administration of matters related to fisheries, animal husbandry and dairying. The ministry came into existence on 31 May 2019 after the formation of the Second Modi ministry. Prior to becoming an independent ministry, the ministry was a department under the Ministry of Agriculture and Farmers' Welfare.

The Ministry of Fisheries, Animal Husbandry and Dairying was named as the Ministry of Animal Husbandry, Fisheries and Dairying at the time of its formation in 2019, but was later renamed to its present name in 2021. The ministry is headed by the Minister of Fisheries, Animal Husbandry and Dairying, who is usually a cabinet minister in the union cabinet and is assisted by a minister of state.

The first minister was Giriraj Singh who served from 2019 until 2021. The current minister is Lalan Singh, who has been in office since June 2024. The current minister of state is S. P. Singh Baghel.

== Organisations ==
=== Departments ===
The Ministry of Fisheries, Animal Husbandry and Dairying has two departments:

- Department of Animal Husbandry
- Department of Fisheries

=== Attached/subordinated offices ===
- Central Institute of Coastal Engineering for Fishery, Bangalore
- Centre of Excellence for Animal Husbandry
- Breed Improvement Institutes
- Central Poultry Development Organizations
- Central Sheep Breeding Farm
- Central Fodder Development Organizations
- Chaudhary Charan Singh National Institute of Animal Health, Baghpat
- Animal Quarantine & Certification Service Stations
- Delhi Milk Scheme

=== Boards ===
- National Fisheries Development Board
- National Dairy Development Board
- Animal Welfare Board of India

=== Others ===
- Coastal Aquaculture Authority
- Central Poultry Development Organization
- Veterinary Council of India

== Cabinet Ministers ==
Portrait	Minister (Birth-Death) Constituency	Term of office			Political party	Ministry	Prime Minister
Portrait	Minister (Birth-Death) Constituency	From	To	Period	Political party	Ministry	Prime Minister
	Giriraj Singh (born 1952); MP for Begusarai	31 May 2019	7 July 2021	2 years, 37 days	Bharatiya Janata Party	Modi II	Narendra Modi
	Parshottam Rupala (born 1954); Rajya Sabha MP for Gujarat	7 July 2021	9 June 2024	2 years 338 days	Bharatiya Janata Party	Modi II	Narendra Modi
	Lalan Singh (born 1952); MP for Munger	9 June 2024	Incumbent	2 years, 46 days	Janata Dal (United)	Modi III	Narendra Modi

== Ministers of State ==
Portrait	Minister (Birth-Death) Constituency	Term of office			Political party	Ministry	Prime Minister
Portrait	Minister (Birth-Death) Constituency	From	To	Period	Political party	Ministry	Prime Minister
	Sanjeev Balyan (born 1972); MP for Muzaffarnagar	31 May 2019	9 June 2024	5 years, 9 days	Bharatiya Janata Party	Modi II	Narendra Modi
	Pratap Chandra Sarangi (born 1955); MP for Balasore	31 May 2019	7 July 2021	2 years, 37 days	Bharatiya Janata Party	Modi II	Narendra Modi
	L. Murugan (born 1977); Rajya Sabha MP for Madhya Pradesh	7 July 2021	9 June 2024	2 years, 338 days	Bharatiya Janata Party	Modi II	Narendra Modi
	George Kurian (born 1960); Rajya Sabha MP for Madhya Pradesh (Until 21 June 2026)	10 June 2024	23 June 2026	2 years, 13 days	Bharatiya Janata Party	Modi III	Narendra Modi
	S. P. Singh Baghel (born 1960); MP for Agra	10 June 2024	Incumbent	2 years, 46 days	Bharatiya Janata Party	Modi III	Narendra Modi

== See also ==
- Department of Animal husbandry and Dairying
- Animal Welfare Board of India
