= Dileepbhai Sanghani =

Indian politician

Chairman of IFFCO
- Incumbent
- Assumed office 20 October 2021

Cabinet Minister of Agriculture, Cooperation, Law and Justice in Government of Gujarat
- In office 2007–2012
- Constituency: Amreli

Minister of Road and Building, Fisheries and Jail in Government of Gujarat
- In office 1990–1991
- Constituency: Amreli

Deputy Chief Whip of Loksabha
- In office 1993–1997

Member of parliament
- In office 1991–2004
- Constituency: Amreli

MLA
- In office 1982–1991
- Constituency: Amreli

Dileepbhai Sanghani (born 12 May 1954) is an Indian politician and former Cabinet Minister in the Bharatiya Janata Party ministry of Gujarat state of India.

He was a minister of Agriculture, Co-operation Animal Husbandry, Fisheries, Cow-Breeding, Prison, Excise Law & Justice, Legislative & Parliamentary Affairs. He was a member of the Gujarat Legislative Assembly. He was earlier member of the Lok Sabha representing Amreli for four terms.
