= Lalan Singh =

Indian politician (born 1955)

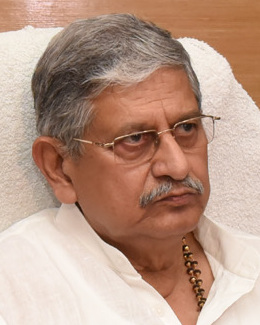
- Singh in 2024

Union Minister of Fisheries, Animal Husbandry and Dairying
- Incumbent
- Assumed office 9 June 2024
- Prime Minister: Narendra Modi
- Preceded by: Parshottam Rupala

Union Minister of Panchayati Raj
- Incumbent
- Assumed office 9 June 2024
- Prime Minister: Narendra Modi
- Preceded by: Giriraj Singh

National President of Janata Dal (United)
- In office 31 July 2021 – 29 December 2023
- Preceded by: Ramchandra Prasad Singh
- Succeeded by: Nitish Kumar

Bihar Minister of Water Resources
- In office 2 June 2014 – 27 May 2019
- Chief Minister: Jitan Ram Manjhi; Nitish Kumar
- Succeeded by: Sanjay Kumar Jha

Member of Bihar Legislative Council
- In office 24 May 2014 – 23 May 2019
- Constituency: Nominated by the Governor

Member of Parliament, Lok Sabha
- Incumbent
- Assumed office 23 May 2019
- Preceded by: Veena Devi
- Constituency: Munger, Bihar
- In office 16 May 2009 – 16 May 2014
- Preceded by: Jaiprakash Narayan Yadav
- Succeeded by: Veena Devi
- Constituency: Munger, Bihar
- In office 16 May 2004 – 16 May 2009
- Preceded by: Rajo Singh
- Succeeded by: Monazir Hassan
- Constituency: Begusarai, Bihar

Member of Parliament, Rajya Sabha
- In office 3 April 2000 – 13 May 2004
- Succeeded by: Vidya Sagar Nishad
- Constituency: Bihar

Personal details
- Born: Rajiv Ranjan Singh; 24 January 1955 (age 71) Patna, Bihar, India
- Party: Janata Dal (United)
- Other political affiliations: Samata Party (till 2004)
- Spouse: Renu Devi (m. 1977)
- Children: 1
- Education: T.N.B. College, Bhagalpur University (Bachelor of Arts (Honors))
- Profession: Politician; social worker

Rajiv Ranjan Singh (born 24 January 1955), better known as Lalan Singh, is an Indian politician who is serving as the 11th Minister of Panchayati Raj and 3rd Minister of Fisheries, Animal Husbandry and Dairying since 2024. He is also the Member of Parliament representing Munger in the 17th Lok Sabha from Janata Dal (United). He was the national party president of JDU (Janta Dal United) from 31 July 2021 to 29 December 2023. He was also the former JD(U) Bihar unit President.

He was nominated as a member of the Bihar Legislative Council in June 2014 after his defeat in the May 2014 Lok Sabha elections. He was a member of the 15th Lok Sabha of India and represented Munger Lok Sabha constituency of Bihar. He also represented Begusarai constituency in the 14th Lok Sabha of India.

Lalan Singh won 2024 Lok Sabha Election from Munger Lok Sabha constituency.

== Personal life ==
Singh was born in Village Gilanichak, PO+PS Chandi Nalanda district Bihar 24 January 1955 to Jwala Prasad Singh and Kaushalya Devi. He graduated with a Bachelor of Arts (Honors) degree from T.N.B. College, Bhagalpur University. Singh was a General Secretary of College Students Union and in 1974, had participated in the movements led by Jayaprakash Narayan.

Singh is married to Renu Devi and they have a daughter together.

== Political career ==
Lalan Singh represented the Munger constituency of Bihar and was the President of Bihar JDU when he rebelled against CM Nitish Kumar in 2010 and later continued to be an unattached member of JD(U). The party moved in Lok Sabha to demand his disqualification but the move was aborted post his rapprochement with Nitish Kumar in 2013. He was given a ticket to contest the Munger Lok Sabha seat but was defeated by Veena Devi of LJP by nearly 1 lakh votes.

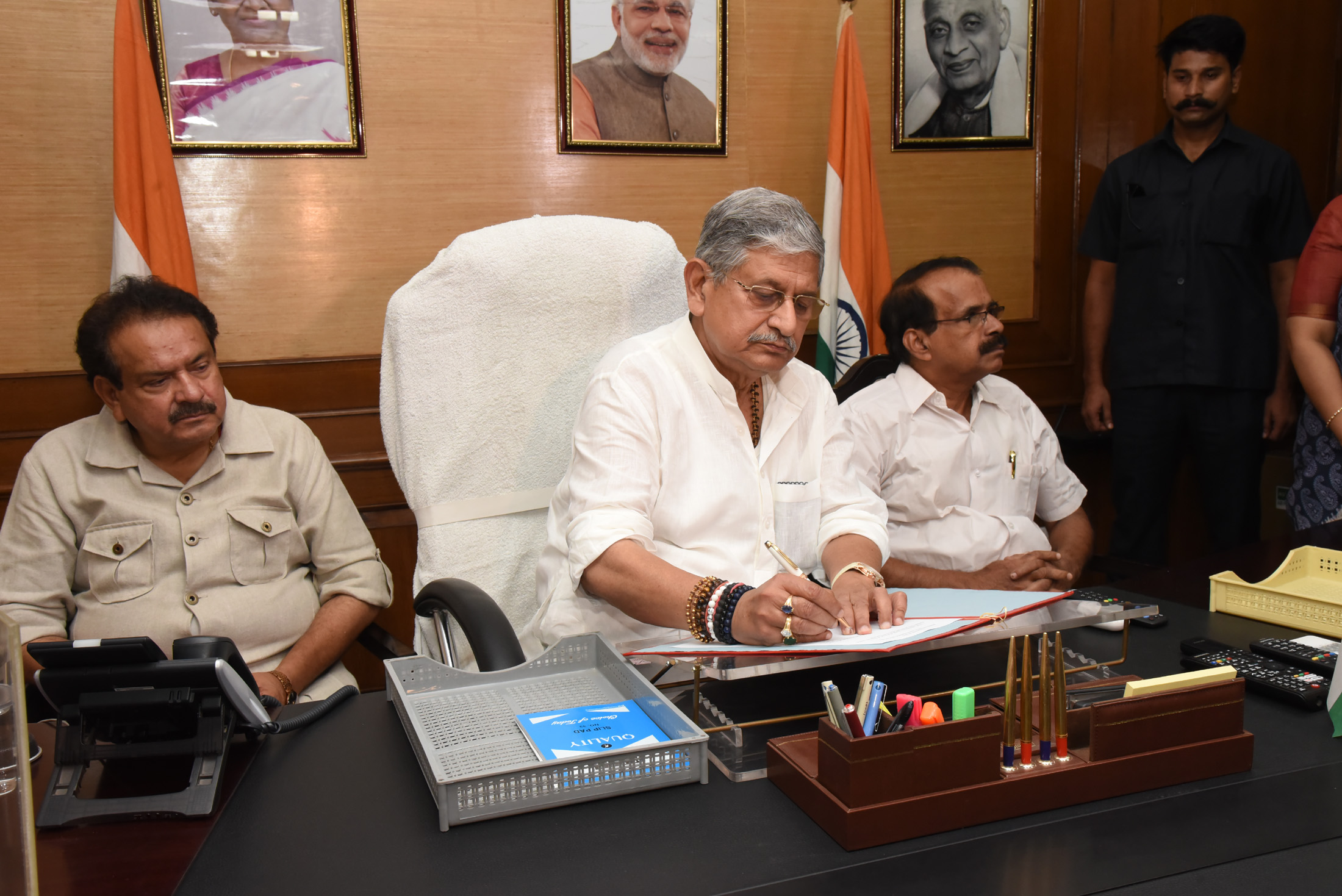
Singh taking charge as the Union Minister for Fisheries, Animal Husbandry and Dairying.

He was nominated to the Bihar Legislative Council under the Governor's quota and made the Minister for Road Construction Department in the Jitan Ram Manjhi cabinet in June 2014. His induction and elevation despite the electoral loss sparked a rebellion in JDU led by Gyanendra Singh Gyanu who later defected to BJP with a group of 12 MLAs. He was sacked from the cabinet by Jitan Ram Manjhi as a minister along with Prashant Kumar Shahi in February 2015. When Nitish Kumar became Chief Minister, he was again inducted as a Minister in the Mahagathbandhan Government.

Singh supported Anant Kumar Singh in 2025 while the latter was accused of murder and other violent offences. He worked with Bihar Deputy Chief Minister Samrat Choudhary to lead a large roadshow in Mokama for a campaign associated with Anant Kumar Singh in violation of electoral and safety regulations. He was also accused of instructing supporters to prevent opposition voters from leaving their homes on polling day and to ensure votes in favour of the BJP–JDU alliance.

== See also ==
- Nitish Kumar
- RCP Singh
- Kapildeo Singh
- Sanjay Kumar Jha
- Ashok Chaudhary
- Third Modi ministry
