= Janata Dal (United) =

Political party in India

- Abbreviation: JD(U)
- President: Nitish Kumar
- Rajya Sabha Leader: Sanjay Kumar Jha
- Lok Sabha Leader: Dileshwar Kamait
- Founder: Sharad Yadav; George Fernandes; Nitish Kumar
- Founded: 30 October 2003 (22 years ago) (Note: Official date celebrated by party. But ECI given this name in 4 August 1999)
- Merger of: Janata Dal (Sharad Yadav faction); Samata Party; Lok Shakti
- Headquarters: 7, Jantar Mantar Road, New Delhi, India-110001
- Newspaper: JD(U) Sandesh
- Student wing: Chhatra Janata Dal (U)
- Youth wing: Yuva JD(U)
- Ideology: Social democracy Secularism
- Political position: Centre-left
- ECI status: State Party: Arunachal Pradesh, Bihar, Manipur
- Alliance: National Alliance NDA (2003–2013, 2017–2022, since 2024); Regional Alliances NEDA (2017–2022, since 2024); Former Alliances: MGB (Bihar) (2015–2017, 2022–2024); INDIA (2023–2024); Mahagathbandhan (Jharkhand) (2022–2024); LDF (Kerala) (2014–2017); People's Front (Tamil Nadu) (2004); ASOM (Assam) (2021–2024); UPA (2015–2017, 2022–2023) (till dissolved)) (National); Mahajot (West Bengal) (2016); Mahajot (Assam) (Assam) (2016–2017); AIUDF-led Alliance (Assam) (2016)
- Seats in Rajya Sabha: 4 / 245
- Seats in Lok Sabha: 12 / 543
- Seats in State Legislative Assemblies: List 85 / 243 (Bihar) 1 / 81 (Jharkhand) 1 / 60 (Manipur)
- Number of states and union territories in government: 1 / 31

Election symbol
- Arrow

Party flag
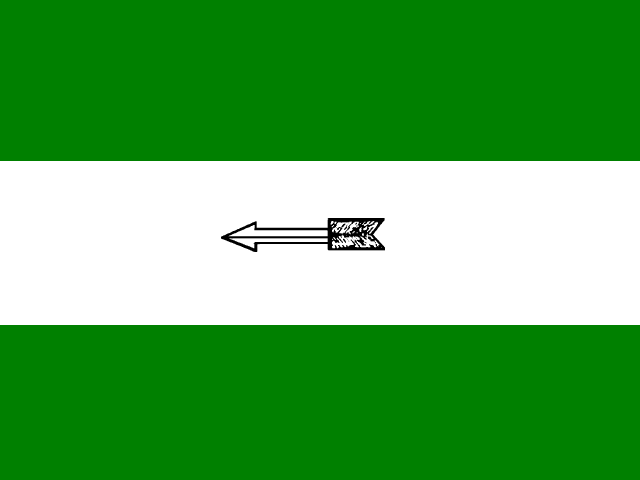

Website
- jdu.org.in

Janata Dal (United) (JD(U), lit. 'People's Party (United)'), is a social democratic and secular Indian political party, rooted mainly in eastern and north-eastern India, whose stated goals are promoting social justice and lifting up marginalised people. JD(U) is recognised as a state party in the states of Bihar, Arunachal Pradesh & Manipur where they are in coalition government. JD(U), as part of the Bharatiya Janata Party-led National Democratic Alliance, won 12 seats in the 2024 Indian general election, making it the seventh largest party in the Lok Sabha.

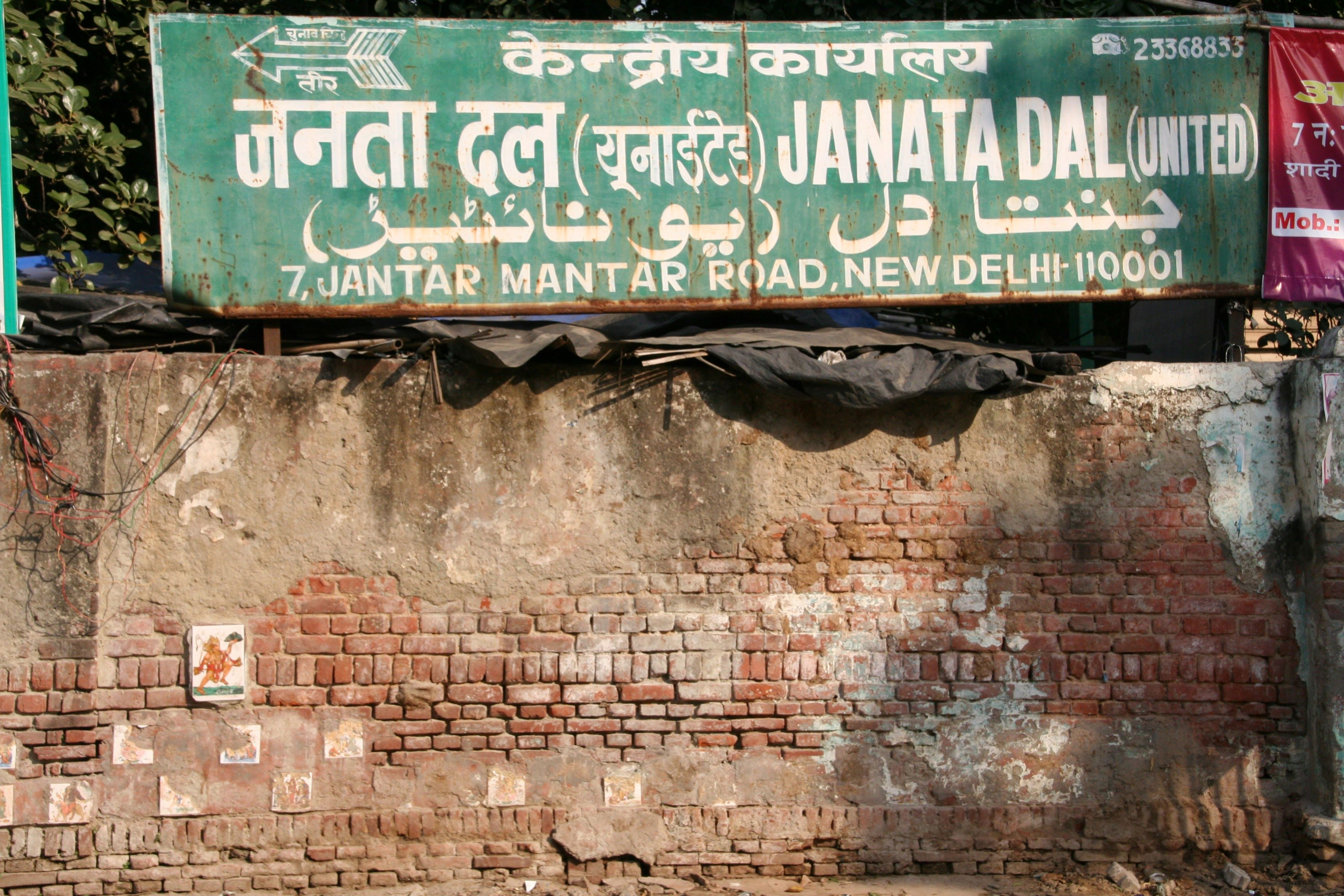

JD(U) was formed with the merger of Sharad Yadav's faction of the Janata Dal, the Samata Party and the Lok Shakti party on 30 October 2003. The party's mentor and patron was the veteran socialist George Fernandes, successively leader of the Samyukta Socialist Party, the Socialist Party and the Samata Party. However, the Election Commission of India initially refused the merger of the latter: party president Brahmanand Mandal was suffering from Alzheimer's disease and not physically well, so Uday Mandal replaced him.

== History ==
=== Formation ===
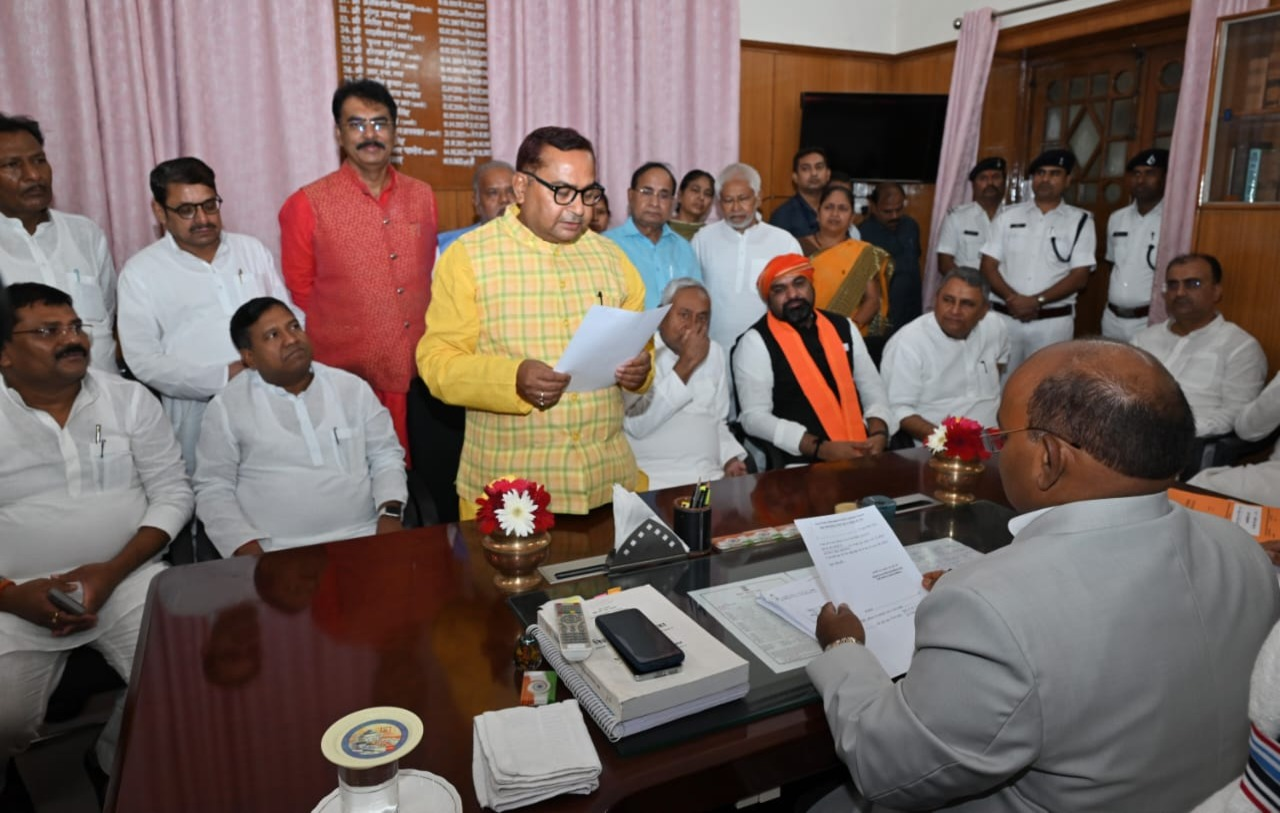
JDU leaders Nitish Kumar, Umesh Singh Kushwaha and Vijay Kumar Chaudhary participating in nomination of party's national General Secretary Shri Bhagwan Singh Kushwaha to Bihar Legislative Council in 2024 alongside Bharatiya Janata Party state chief Samrat Choudhary and others.

The Janata Dal (United)'s origin goes back to the period before 1999 General Election. A faction led by then Chief Minister of Karnataka J. H. Patel had lent support to the National Democratic Alliance, leading to the split in the Janata Dal and the formation of Janata Dal (Secular) under H. D. Deve Gowda, who wanted to remain equidistant from both national parties; and Janata Dal under Sharad Yadav was called Janata Dal (United). (Note: 4 August, 1999: The Election Commission issued an order freezing the original "Chakra (Wheel)" symbol of the Janata Dal. To resolve the immediate need for election identities for the upcoming general election, the ECI granted "ad-hoc recognition" to the two splinter groups: The Sharad Yadav-led faction was designated as Janata Dal (United). The H.D. Deve Gowda-led faction was designated as Janata Dal (Secular).)

The Janata Dal (United) was formed with the merger of the Sharad Yadav faction of the Janata Dal, the Lok Shakti and the Samata Party. On 30 October 2003, the Samata Party led by George Fernandes and Nitish Kumar merged with the Janata Dal. The merged entity was called Janata Dal (United) with the arrow symbol of Janata Dal (United) and the green and white flag of the Samata Party. The uniting force is believed to be common opposition to Rashtriya Janata Dal in Bihar especially after the Rashtriya Janata Dal welcomed Samata Party rebels like Raghunath Jha into the party.

=== In NDA ===
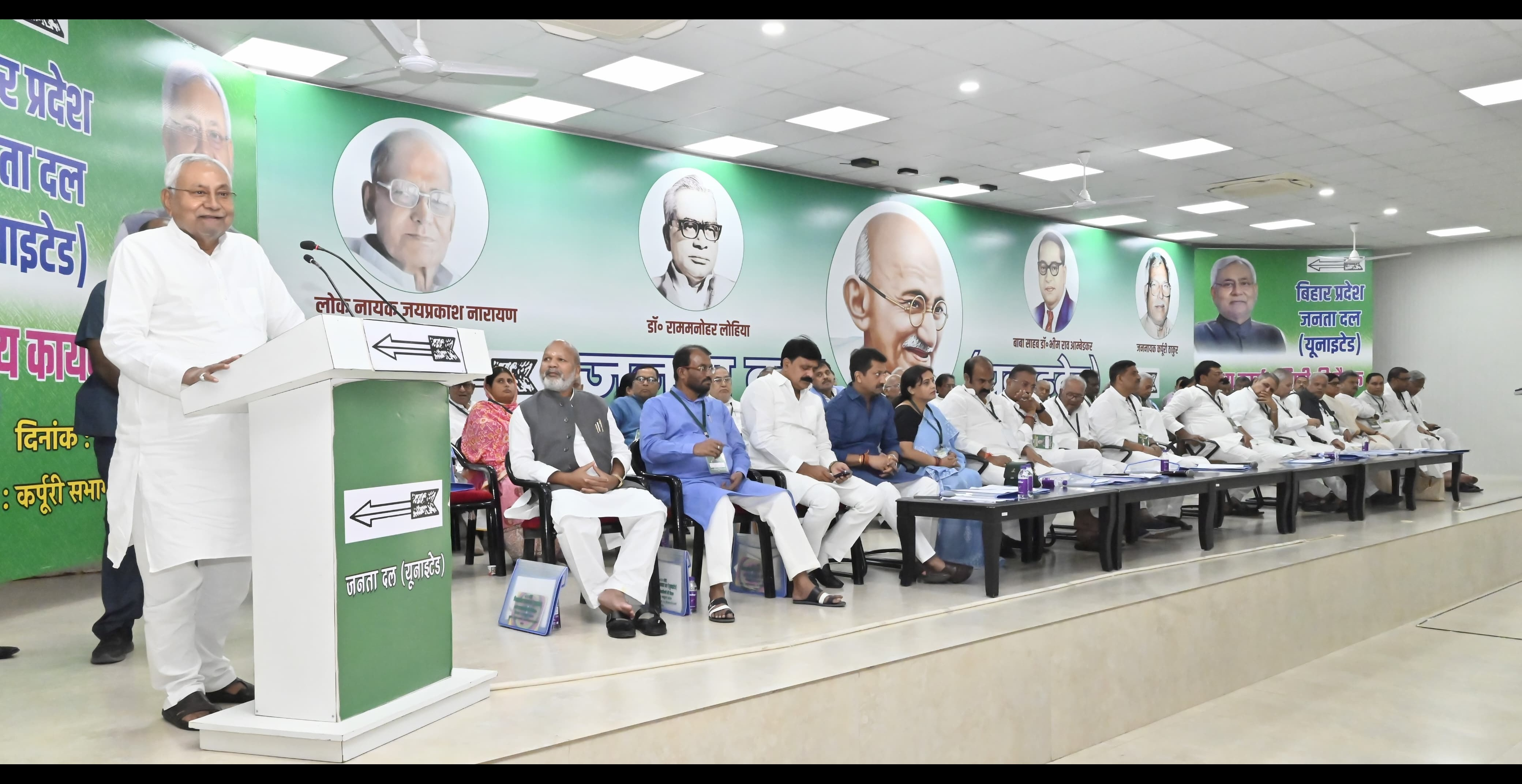
Nitish Kumar sharing the stage with legislators and senior leaders of Janata Dal United on the occasion of state council meeting of the party at its headquarter Karpoori Bhawan, Patna.

JD(U) joined NDA and along with its alliance partner, the BJP defeated the RJD-led UPA government in Bihar in November 2005. The new government was headed by JD(U) leader, Nitish Kumar and NDA continued to govern state. The alliance contested 2009 Indian general election and won 32 seats. BJP won 12 while JD(U) won 20. JD(U) won 115 and BJP won 91 seats in 2010 Bihar Legislative Assembly election. Thus together holding 206 seats in 243 member Bihar Legislative Assembly.

=== Out of NDA ===
JD(U) broke its 17 years old alliance with the BJP in Bihar in protest against the elevation of Narendra Modi as ahead of the election campaign committee of BJP for 2014 Indian general election. JD(U) President Sharad Yadav and then Bihar Chief Minister Nitish Kumar announced their end of coalition at a press conference on 16 June 2013, exactly a week after Narendra Modi was made the BJP's campaign committee chairman, who was later made the prime ministerial candidate of NDA. Just after this split, Sharad Yadav relinquished his position as the NDA convenor.

The JD(U) contested the election in Bihar in an alliance with the Communist Party of India but they won only two seats out of total forty seats of Bihar while the BJP-LJP alliance won 31 seats. Following poor performance in election, Nitish Kumar resigned as Chief Minister of Bihar and Jitan Ram Manjhi sworn in as a new Chief Minister. When the trust vote was demanded by the BJP to prove majority in Bihar Legislative Assembly, the RJD supported the JD(U) in the assembly on 23 May 2014 to pass the majority mark.

=== The Mahagathbandhan (Grand Alliance) ===
On 29 December 2014, Kerala-based Socialist Janata (Democratic) merged with the JD(U) with its leader M.P. Veerendra Kumar, accepting the party flag from JD(U) leader Nitish Kumar. This was an important milestone in bringing a pan-Indian appeal to the JD(U) which is largely limited to the state of Bihar.

On 9 May, MLA Jitan Ram Manjhi was expelled from the JD(U) and he later founded the Hindustani Awam Morcha along with 17 other dissent JD(U) MLAs.

In the 2015 Bihar Legislative Assembly election JD(U) contested the election in an alliance with the RJD and Congress. It won 71 seats out of the 101 seats it contested and the alliance won 178 seats out the 243 seats in the assembly. Subsequently, Nitish Kumar again became the Chief Minister of Bihar.

In the biennial elections to the Rajya Sabha held in March 2016, the ruling UDF of Kerala state gave one seat to JD(U) Kerala State Unit President M.P. Veerendra Kumar. In spite of having just 2 MLAs in the Legislative Assembly, the Congress gave a berth to its ally.

=== Alliance with NDA ===
On 26 July 2017 5 pm, Nitish Kumar tendered his resignation as Chief Minister of Bihar, ending 20-month-old Mahgathbandhan (grand alliance) rule. The next day on 27 July 2017 10 am he again took oath as Chief Minister of Bihar with the support of BJP. Same day evening, Kerala JD(U) chief M.P. Veerendra Kumar announced the split of Kerala unit of the JD(U) from the party, due to Nitish Kumar led Bihar unit joined hands with the BJP. On 28 July 2017, new NDA government won trust vote in Bihar assembly by 131 votes in favour and 108 against, four legislators did not vote.

=== Out of NDA ===
On 9 August 2022, Nitish Kumar announced that the JD(U)'s alliance with the BJP in the Bihar Legislative Assembly was over. He further made a claim that the new government in Bihar, a coalition of nine parties including the RJD and the INC would be a "Mahagathgandhan 2.0."

=== Reorganisation after 2020 Assembly elections ===
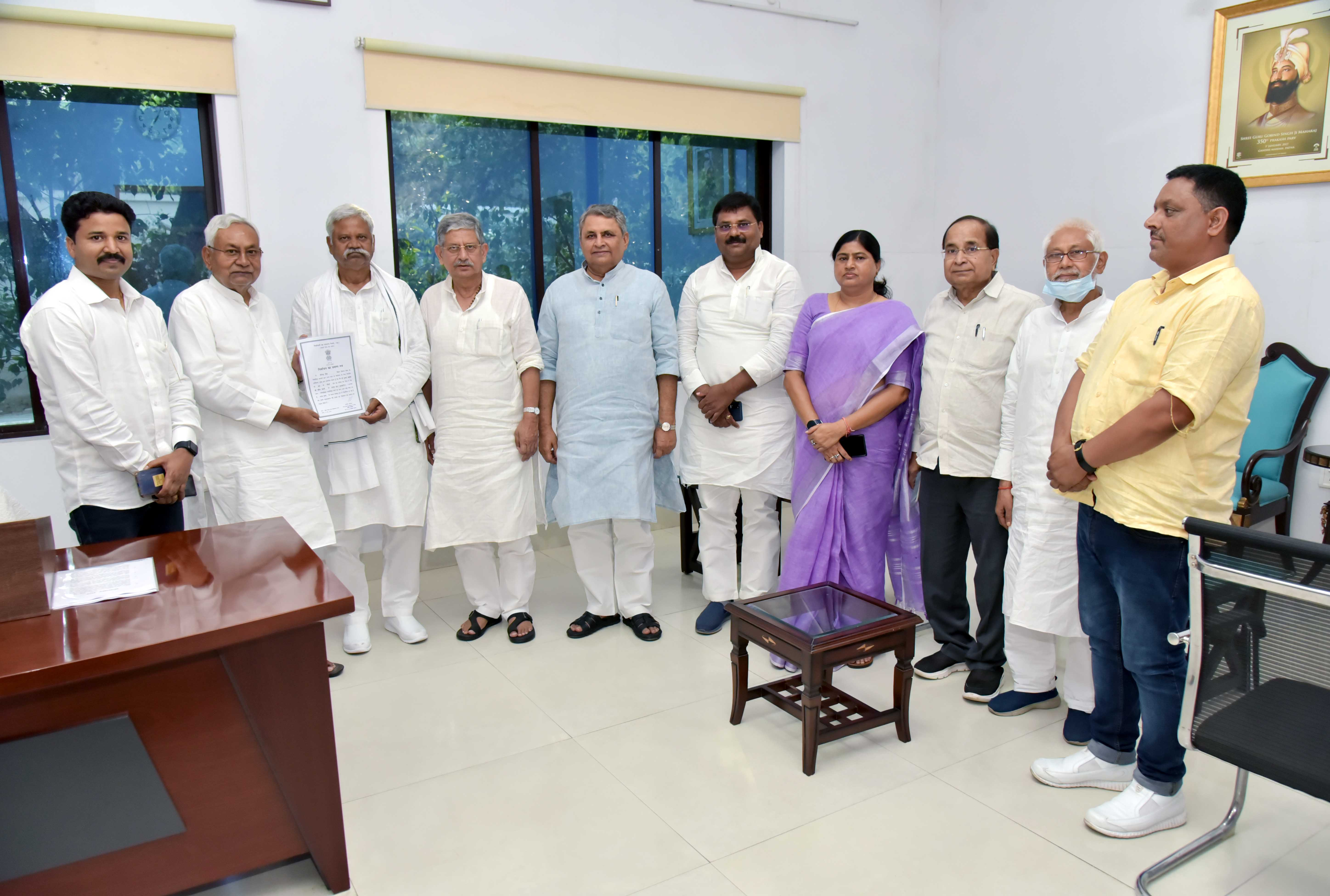
Nitish Kumar with state president Umesh Singh Kushwaha and other leaders of JDU during Rajya Sabha nomination of Khiru Mahto.

The JD(U), just like its parent Samata Party, had the core support of Kushwaha and Kurmi caste, which emanated from the great rally organised in 1993 at Gandhi Maidan, Patna. In 2020 Assembly elections, the party performed badly, and its seats in Bihar Legislative Assembly reduced to 43 from 75 in 2015 elections. The breakaway of the faction led by Upendra Kushwaha, who founded Rashtriya Lok Samata Party, was recognised as one of the principal reason behind reduction in support base of the party in many constituencies. In a bid to retain its support amongst its core vote base, the party made several organisational changes, like appointing Ramchandra Prasad Singh as national president of the party and Umesh Kushwaha as the state president. Meanwhile, it also tried to give effect to the merger of the Upendra Kushwaha led RLSP with itself. The RLSP was formed as a result of a split in JD(U) in 2013. Immediately after the merger, Upendra Kushwaha was made president of parliamentary board of the party.

On 20 February 2023, Upendra Kushwaha resigned from the post of president of parliamentary committee of JDU and membership of Bihar Legislative Council and formed another party named Rashtriya Lok Morcha as a breakaway faction of JDU.

However, Umesh Kushwaha, who was re-elected to the post of party's state chief in November 2022, continued to serve party in that position for the second term.

=== 2024 Lok Sabha elections ===
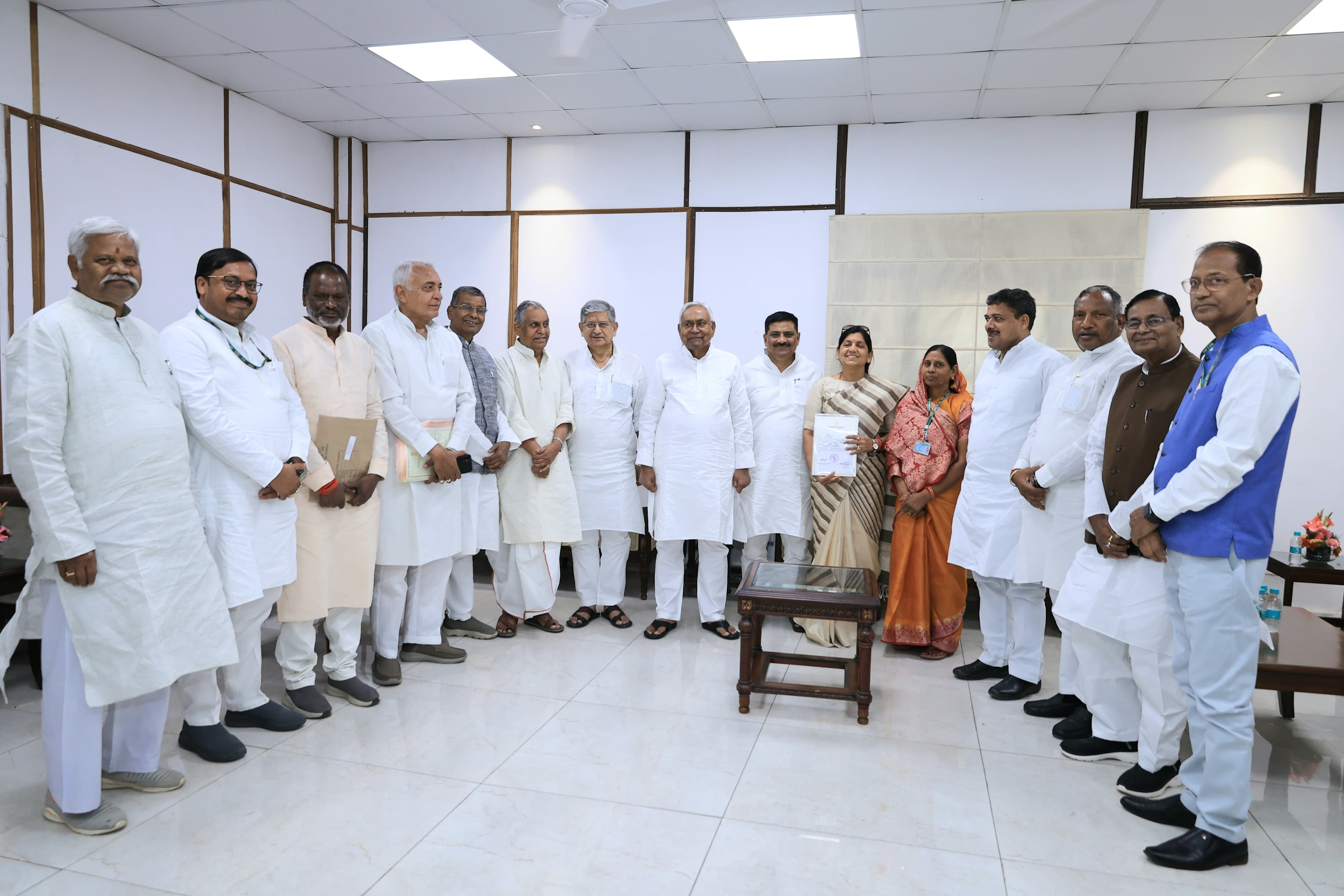
Nitish Kumar with victors of 2024 Indian general election in Bihar.

In the 2024 Lok Sabha elections, JDU was granted 16 seats against Bharatiya Janata Party's 17 seats and it contested in alliance with BJP and Chirag Paswan led Lok Janashakti Party (Ram Vilas). It won 12 seats in this election and played an important role in the formation of the Third Modi government. With this victory, JDU changed the narrative that it has been weakened over the time under the leadership of Nitish Kumar with latter's growing age and lack of a next generation of leaders in the party.

This election also revealed JDU's hold and support base amongst the members of Extremely Backward Castes, which turned out to be the reason behind party's spectacular performance in the constituencies dominated by them. In order to consolidate its support base amongst the different caste groups, JDU appointed Dileshwar Kamait, a member of Extremely Backward Caste as its leader of parliamentary party in 18th Lok Sabha, Sanjay Kumar Jha was appointed as leader of parliamentary party in Rajya Sabha after the 2024 general elections.

Subsequently, Lalan Singh and Ram Nath Thakur were made union ministers in Third Modi government from the JDU.

=== 2025 Bihar Legislative Assembly election ===
In the 2025 Bihar Legislative Assembly election, JD(U) contested the election in an alliance with the BJP, HAM (S) and RLM. It won 85 seats out of the 101 seats it contested with the BJP emerging as the single largest party and winning 89 seats. The alliance won 202 seats out the 243 seats in the assembly. Subsequently, Nitish Kumar again became the Chief Minister of Bihar. After Kumar announced his pending resignation in order to contest the 2026 Rajya Sabha elections, his son Nishant joined the JD(U) in March; this was seen as a departure from his previous policy of anti-dynasticism.

== Electoral performance ==
=== Lok Sabha elections ===
Lok Sabha	Election	Seats contested	Seats won	Votes Polled	% of votes	State (seats)	Ref.
14th Lok Sabha	2004	73	8 / 543	91,44,963	2.53	Bihar (6); Lakshadweep(1); Uttar Pradesh(1)	
15th Lok Sabha	2009	27	20 / 543	59,36,786	1.5	Bihar (20)	
16th Lok Sabha	2014	93	2 / 543	59,92,281	1.08	Bihar (2)	
17th Lok Sabha	2019	24	16 / 543	89,26,679	1.45	Bihar(16)	
18th Lok Sabha	2024	16	12 / 543	80,25,000	1.25	Bihar(12)	

All time-JDU Lok Sabha seat count

=== Assembly elections ===
Vidhan Sabha	Assembly Election	Seats Contested	Seats Won	% of votes	% of votes in seats contested	Party Votes	Ref.
Bihar Legislative Assembly
12th Vidhan Sabha	2005 February	138	55 / 243	14.55	26.41	3,564,930	
13th Vidhan Sabha	2005 October	139	88 / 243	20.46	37.41	4,819,759	
14th Vidhan Sabha	2010	144	115 / 243	22.58	38.77	6,561,906	
15th Vidhan Sabha	2015	101	71 / 243	16.8	40.65	6,416,414	
16th Vidhan Sabha	2020	115	43 / 243	15.39	32.83	6,485,179	
17th Vidhan Sabha	2025	100	85 / 243	19.25		9,667,118	
Jharkhand Legislative Assembly
2nd Vidhan Sabha	2005	18	6 / 81	4.0			
3rd Vidhan Sabha	2009	14	2 / 81	2.78		285,565	
4th Vidhan Sabha	2014	11	0 / 81	0.96		133815	
5th Vidhan Sabha	2019	45	0 / 81	0.73		110120	
6th Vidhan Sabha	2024	2	1 / 81	0.81	36.69	145,040	
Arunachal Pradesh Legislative Assembly
7th	2019	14	7 / 31	9.89		61,324	
Manipur Legislative Assembly
13th	2022	38	6 / 60	10.77		200,100	

== Prominent members ==
- Nitish Kumar, National President, Former Chief Minister of Bihar.
- Nishant Kumar, Health Minister of Bihar and son of Nitish Kumar
- Rajiv Ranjan Singh, Member of Parliament and Former Bihar JD(U) President.
- Umesh Kushwaha, Bihar state President of Janata Dal (United).
- Ramsewak Singh Kushwaha, National General Secretary.
- Santosh Kumar Kushwaha, National General Secretary.
- Kushwaha Ramkumar Sharma, National General Secretary.
- Shri Bhagwan Singh Kushwaha, National General Secretary.
- Manish Kumar Verma, National General Secretary.
- Vijay Kumar Chaudhary, Former Speaker of Bihar Legislative Assembly, Former Bihar JD(U) President & Former Leader of JD(U) Legislature Party.
- Harivansh Narayan Singh – Deputy Chairman of the Rajya Sabha (2018)
- Bashistha Narain Singh, Member of Parliament in Rajya Sabha.
- Ram Nath Thakur, JDU Party leader in Rajya Sabha.
- Bijendra Prasad Yadav, Minister for Energy, Registration, Excise and Prohibition, Government of Bihar

== List of chief ministers ==
=== Chief ministers of Bihar ===
No	Name	Constituency	Term of office		Tenure length	Assembly	Ministry
1	Nitish Kumar	MLC	24 November 2005	26 November 2010	8 years, 177 days	14th	Nitish Kumar II
1	Nitish Kumar	MLC	26 November 2010	20 May 2014	8 years, 177 days	15th	Nitish Kumar III
2	Jitan Ram Manjhi	Makhdumpur	20 May 2014	22 February 2015	278 days	15th	Manjhi
(1)	Nitish Kumar	MLC	22 February 2015	20 November 2015	11 years, 216 days	15th	Nitish Kumar IV
(1)	Nitish Kumar	MLC	20 November 2015	26 July 2017	11 years, 216 days	16th	Nitish Kumar V
(1)	Nitish Kumar	MLC	26 July 2017	16 November 2020	11 years, 216 days	16th	Nitish Kumar VI
(1)	Nitish Kumar	MLC	16 November 2020	9 August 2022	11 years, 216 days	17th	Nitish Kumar VII
(1)	Nitish Kumar	MLC	9 August 2022	31 January 2024	11 years, 216 days	17th	Nitish Kumar VIII
(1)	Nitish Kumar	MLC	31 January 2024	20 November 2025	11 years, 216 days	17th	Nitish Kumar IX
(1)	Nitish Kumar	MLC	20 November 2025	14 April 2026	11 years, 216 days	18th	Nitish Kumar X

== List of ministers in union government ==
No.	Portrait	Portfolio	Name (Birth–Death)	Term in office			Constituency (House)	Prime Minister
No.	Portrait	Portfolio	Name (Birth–Death)	Assumed office	Left office	Time in office	Constituency (House)	Prime Minister
1		Minister of Defence	George Fernandes (1930–2019)	15 October 2001	22 May 2004	2 years, 220 days	Nalanda (Lok Sabha)	Atal Bihari Vajpayee
2		Minister of Consumer Affairs, Food & Public Distribution	Sharad Yadav (1947–2023)	1 July 2002	22 May 2004	1 year, 326 days	Madhepura (Lok Sabha)	Atal Bihari Vajpayee
3		Minister of Railways	Nitish Kumar (born 1951)	20 March 2001	22 May 2004	3 years, 63 days	Barh (Lok Sabha)	Atal Bihari Vajpayee
4		Minister of External Affairs (MoS)	Digvijay Singh (1955–2010)	1 July 2002	22 May 2004	1 year, 326 days	Banka (Lok Sabha)	Atal Bihari Vajpayee
5		Minister of Steel	Ramchandra Prasad Singh (born 1958)	7 July 2021	6 July 2022	364 days	Bihar (Rajya Sabha)	Narendra Modi
6		Minister of Panchayati Raj	Lalan Singh (born 1955)	10 June 2024	Incumbent	2 years, 108 days	Munger (Lok Sabha)	Narendra Modi
6		Minister of Fisheries, Animal Husbandry & Dairying	Lalan Singh (born 1955)	10 June 2024	Incumbent	2 years, 108 days	Munger (Lok Sabha)	Narendra Modi
7		Minister of Agriculture & Farmers Welfare (MoS)	Ram Nath Thakur (born 1950)	10 June 2024	Incumbent	2 years, 108 days	Bihar (Rajya Sabha)	Narendra Modi

=== List of current Rajya Sabha members ===
No.	Image	Name	Date of appointment	Date of retirement	Duration
1		Ram Nath Thakur	10 Apr 2020	10 Apr 2026	6 years, 0 days
2		Sanjay Kumar Jha	3 Apr 2024	4 Apr 2030	6 years, 1 day
3		Harivansh Narayan Singh (Deputy Chairman of the Rajya Sabha)	10 Apr 2020	10 Apr 2026	6 years, 0 days
4		Khiru Mahto	8 July 2022	7 July 2028	5 years, 365 days

=== List of current Lok Sabha members ===
No.	Image	Name	Constituency
1		Lalan Singh	Munger
2		Giridhari Yadav	Banka
3		Ajay Kumar Mandal	Bhagalpur
4		Sunil Kumar	Valmiki Nagar
5		Lovely Anand	Sheohar
6		Devesh Chandra Thakur	Sitamarhi
7		Dileshwar Kamait	Supaul
8		Vijay Lakshmi Kushwaha	Siwan
9		Alok Kumar Suman	Gopalganj
10		Kaushalendra Kumar	Nalanda
11		Dinesh Chandra Yadav	Madhepura
12		Ramprit Mandal	Jhanjharpur

== National presidents ==
No.	Portrait	Name (Birth–Death)	Term in office		
No.	Portrait	Name (Birth–Death)	Assumed office	Left office	Time in office
1		Sharad Yadav (1947–2023)	30 October 2003	10 April 2016	12 years, 163 days
2		Nitish Kumar (born 1951)	10 April 2016	27 December 2020	4 years, 261 days
3		Ramchandra Prasad Singh (born 1958)	27 December 2020	31 July 2021	216 days
4		Lalan Singh (born 1955)	31 July 2021	29 December 2023	2 years, 151 days
(2)		Nitish Kumar (born 1951)	29 December 2023	Incumbent	2 years, 271 days

== See also ==
- National Democratic Alliance
- List of political parties in India
