= Tilkari, Munger =

Tilkari
- Village
- Location in Bihar, India Tilkari (India)
- Coordinates: 25°02′59.61″N 86°35′12.49″E
- Country: India
- State: Bihar
- District: Munger
- Subdivision: Haveli Kharagpur
- Elevation: 48 m (157 ft)

Population (2011)
  - Total: 2,000

Languages
  - Official: Angika, Magahi, Hindi
- Time zone: UTC+05:30 (IST)
- PIN: 811213

Tilkari is a village in the Tetiya Bamber Block of Haveli Kharagpur in the Munger district of Bihar, India.

== Geography ==
Tilkari is located on the banks of the Mahane river. With a population of about 2000, it lies under the jurisdiction of Tetia Bamber block. It lies 10 kilometers from Haveli Kharagpur to its north-west and about the same distance from Tarapur in the north-east direction.

== Notable people ==
- Smt. Bina Devi famously known as Mushroom Mahila was awarded with Nari Shakti Puraskar by President Ram Nath Kovind.
