= Arifa Jan =

India activist for rug making

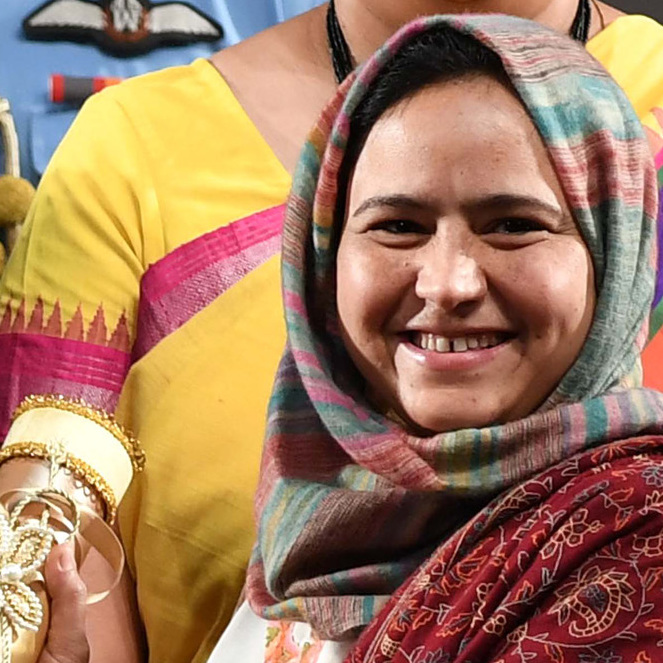
- Born: c. 1987
- Known for: reviving handicrafts in India

Arifa Jan (born c. 1987) is an Indian activist for felt rug making in Srinagar in Kashmir. Jan was awarded the Nari Shakti Puraskar on 8 March 2020.

== Life ==
Arifa Jan was born c. 1987. She is known for reviving the Kashmiri art of rug making known as Namda. She graduated from the Craft Development Institute, Srinagar and she was involved in a project based on Namda textiles. Namda rugs have been made since the 11th century and they are not woven but felted; layers of wool fibre are beaten together and then brightly embroidered. The older areas of Srinagar are known for this, but some skills like dyeing are no longer popular careers.

She has created three manufacturing facilities that employ 25 people and 100 women have been trained to produce these felted rugs. The first of the facilities was in the old part of Srinagar known as Sekidafar and later she created similar organisations in two other areas of Srinagar, Noorbagh and Nawa Kadal.

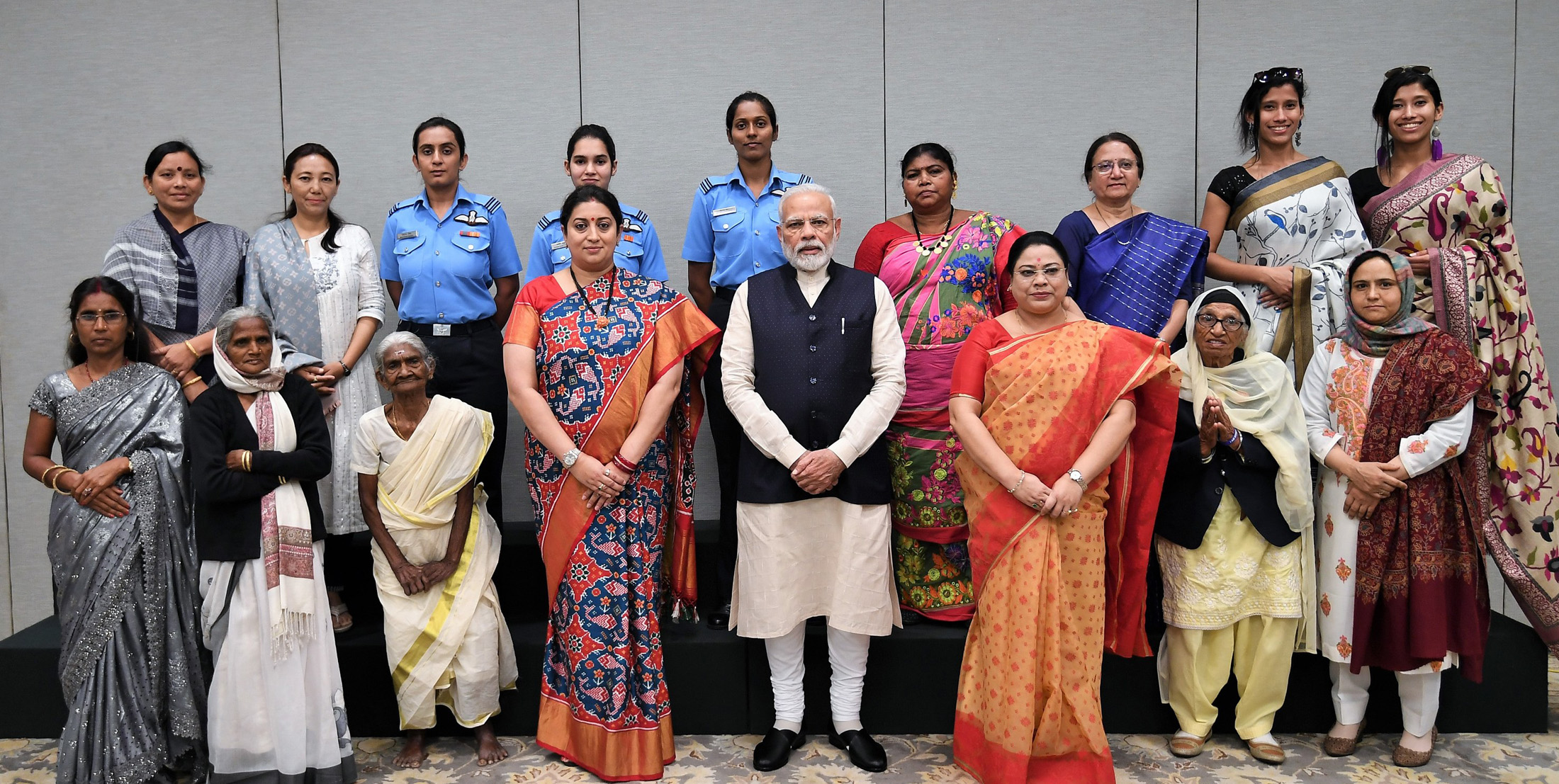
Prime Minister Narendra Modi with the Nari Shakti Awardees on International Women's Day in 2020. Jan is front, far right

Jan became one of what was called the "Magnificent Seven". These were seven women chosen to handle the Prime Minister's account on Women's Day. The others were Chennai-based social worker Sneha Mohandoss, bomb blast survivor Malvika Iyer, Kashmiri Numdha mushroom farmer Bina Devi, Maharashtra Banjara handicraft promotor Vijaya Pawar, Kalpana Ramesh urban water conservationist and lady mason Kalavati Devi.

On the same day she was given the Nari Shakti Puraskar. President Ram Nath Kovind awarded her one of twelve awards. The awards were made on International Women's Day in New Delhi.
