= Ajay Kumar Singh (Bihar politician, Indian National Congress) =

Indian politician

Member of the Bihar Legislative Assembly
- In office 10 November 2020 – 14 November 2025
- Preceded by: Shailesh Kumar
- Succeeded by: Nachiketa Mandal
- Constituency: Jamalpur

Personal details
- Party: Indian National Congress
- Profession: Politician

Ajay Kumar Singh is an Indian politician, serving as a member of the Bihar Legislative Assembly since 2020. He was elected as MLA from Jamalpur, Bihar Assembly constituency in Munger district. He is a member of the Indian National Congress.

== Political career ==
In the Following 2020 Bihar Legislative Assembly election, Ajay Kumar Singh of the Indian National Congress won the seat by defeating Shailesh Kumar of the Janata Dal (United) with a margin of 4432 votes.
