= Bina Devi =

Indian farmer and businesswoman

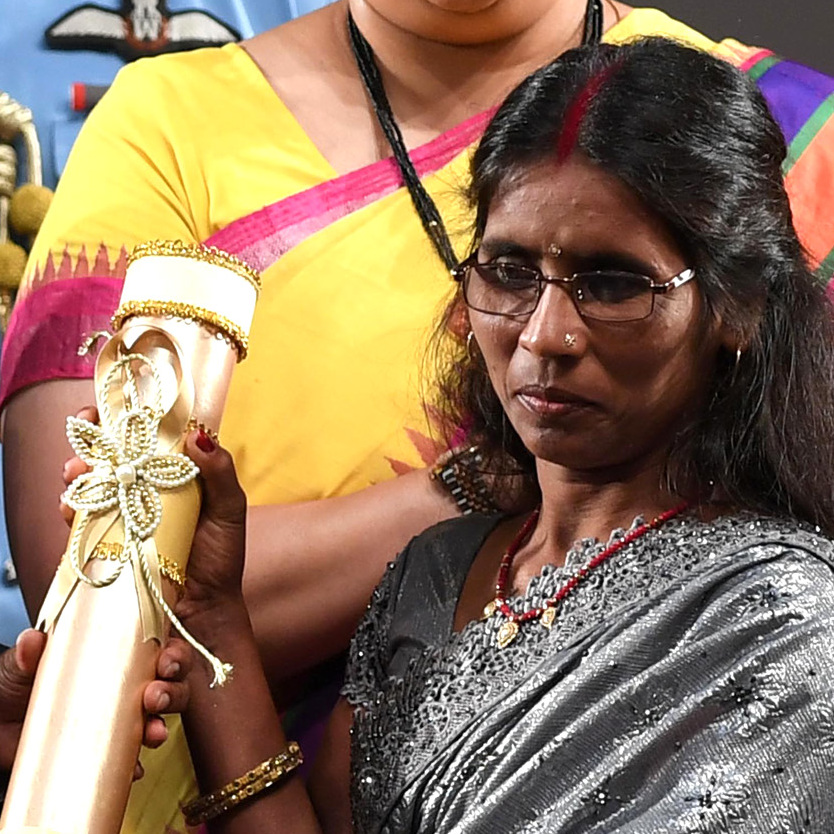
- Bina in 2020
- Born: c. 1977; Munger, Bihar, India
- Occupations: Sarpanch, entrepreneur
- Awards: Nari Shakti Puraskar

Bina Devi (born c. 1977) is an Indian leader who became known for inspiring women to become businesswoman through mushroom cultivation. Nicknamed 'Mushroom Mahila' for popularising mushroom cultivation, Bina Devi gained respect and became the Sarpanch of Dhauri Panchayat, Tetiabamber block for five years. She has trained farmers on mushroom and organic farming, vermicompost production and organic insecticide preparation.

== Early life ==
Bina Devi is from a small village named Tilkari and she was born in about 1977. She belongs to the Bind caste.

== Career ==
Devi grew a small amount of mushrooms under her own bed and this made her realise that this was an opportunity.

Devi had engaged in dairy farming and goat farming but she became known for inspiring self employment among rural women. She has popularized mushroom production in five blocks and 105 neighbouring villages in the Munger district, impacting 1,500 women by supporting them while they adopted mushroom farming.

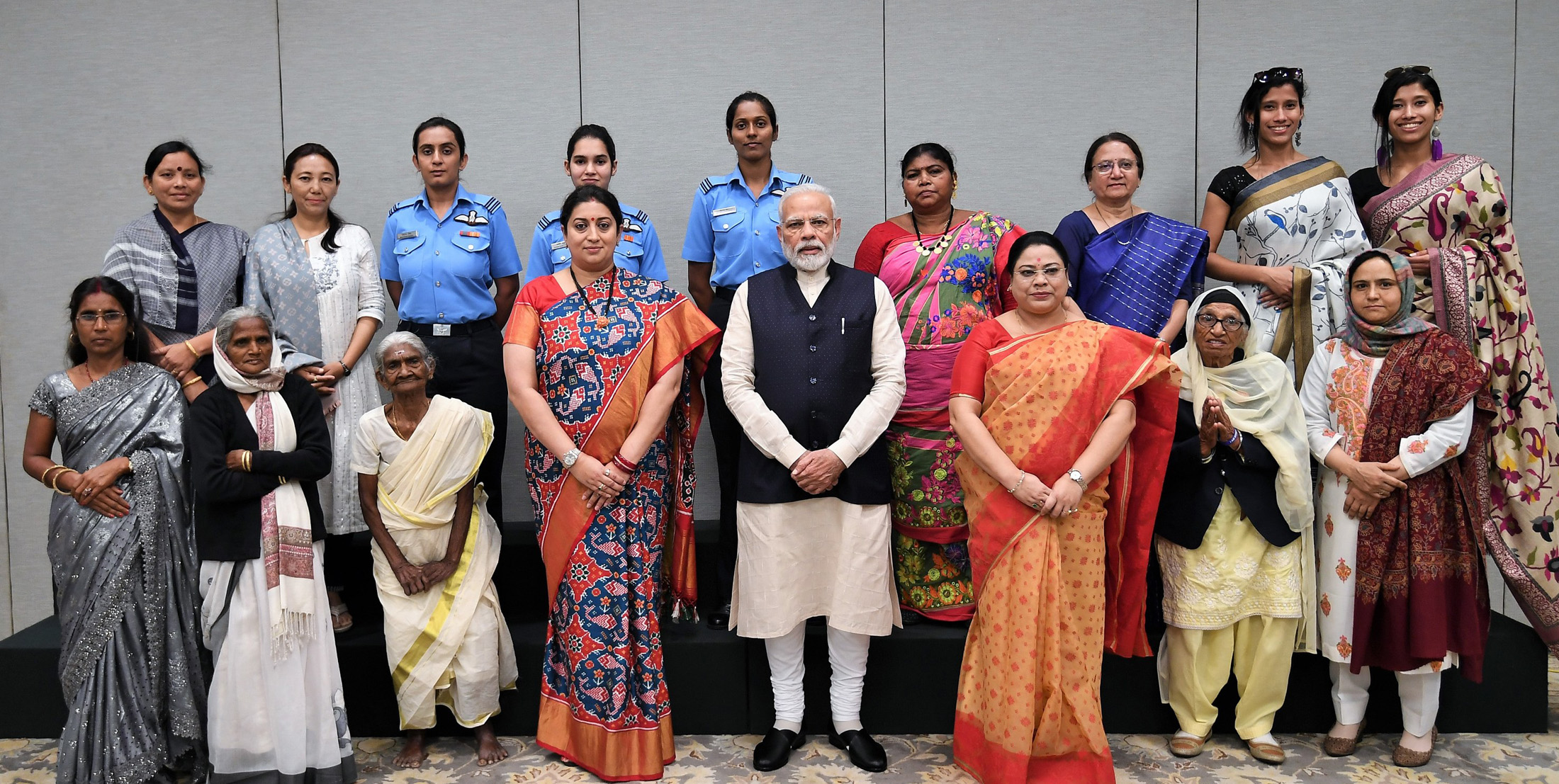
Prime Minister Narendra Modi with the Nari Shakti Awardees on International Women's Day in 2020.

She has been involved in spreading digital literacy and trained 700 women in how to use a mobile phone funded by Tata Trusts. She has trained 2,500 farmers on SRI Method crop farming and supported the formulation of self help groups.

Bina Devi became the seventh woman after Chennai-based social worker Sneha Mohandoss, bomb blast survivor Malvika Iyer, Kashmiri Numdha, handicraft revival worker Arifa Jan, Kalpana Ramesh urban water conservationist, Maharashtra Banjara handicraft promotor Vijaya Pawar and lady mason Kalavati Devi to handle the Prime Minister's account on Women's Day.

On March 9, 2020, she was awarded with Nari Shakti Puraskar by President Ram Nath Kovind.

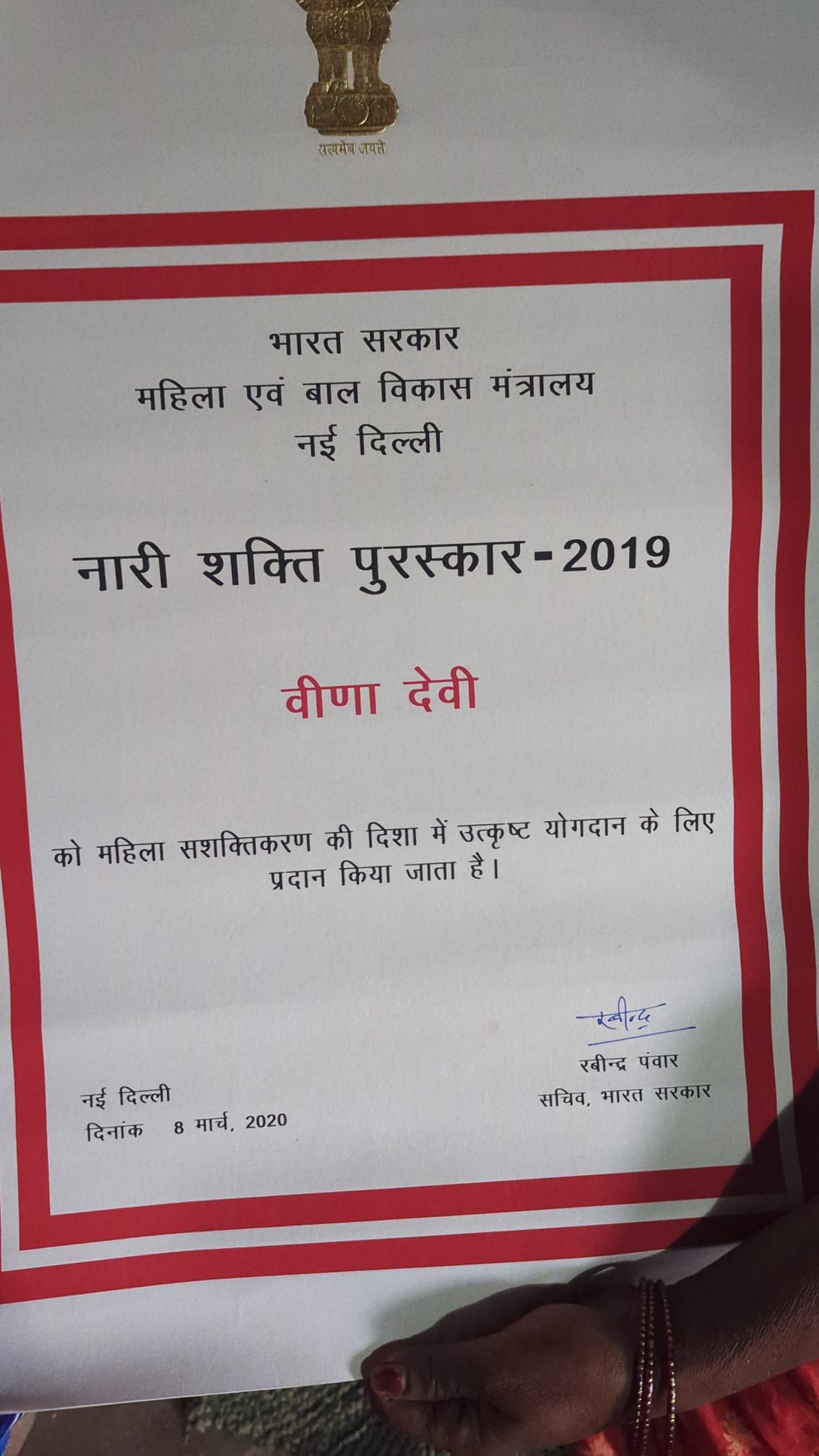
Bina Devi showing her award certificate

Bina devi showing the mushroom's in her farm

Referring to her own mushroom cultivation, she said: "Due to this farming, I got respect. I became a sarpanch of Dhauri Panchayat in Bihar. It is a pleasure for me that many women like myself are getting the opportunity to train."

Recently she was also awarded with 'Pratibha Samman' at the Matri Shakti Sammelan in Munger, Bihar. The event was organized at Lakhisarai, Munger on December 25, 2023.
