= Rishikund Halt railway station =

Railway station in Bihar, India

Rishikund Halt

General information
- Location: Rishikund, Bariarpur, Munger district, Bihar; India
- Coordinates: 25°17′40″N 86°33′44″E
- Elevation: 40 m (130 ft)
- System: Passenger train station
- Owner: Indian Railways
- Operator: Eastern Railway zone
- Line: Sahibganj loop line
- Platforms: 2
- Tracks: 2

Construction
- Structure type: Standard (on ground station)

Other information
- Status: Active
- Station code: RIKD
- Zone(s): Eastern Railway zone
- Division(s): Malda

History
- Former names: East Indian Railway Company

Services
| Preceding station | Indian Railways | Following station |
|---|---|---|
| Bariarpur towards Khana | Eastern Railway zone Sahibganj loop | Ratanpur towards Kiul Junction |
Location

Rishikund Halt railway station is a halt railway station on Sahibganj loop line under the Malda railway division of Eastern Railway zone. It is situated at Rishikund, Bariarpur in Munger district in the Indian state of Bihar.
