= Bhimbandh Wildlife Sanctuary =

Wildlife sanctuary in Bihar, India

- IUCN category IV (habitat/species management area)
- Location within Bihar Location within India
- Interactive map of Bhimbandh Wildlife Sanctuary
- Location: Munger District, Bihar, India
- Nearest city: Haweli Kharagpur, Munger
- Coordinates: 25.23°N 86.28°E
- Established: 1976

Bhimbandh Wildlife Sanctuary is a wildlife sanctuary in Bihar in the south-west of Munger District.

== Etymology ==
During the Mahabharata period, when the Pandavas were on their exile, they had also come to this forest during that time. For his livelihood, Bhima built a dam to merge the two sources. That is why this place was named Bhimbandh.

== Geography ==
Bhimbandh Wildlife Sanctuary is located in the south west of Munger district near the town of Haveli Kharagpur. The forests cover an area or 681.99 km^{2} on the hills and undulating tract of Kharagpur Hills. It is situated at a distance of 56 km from southern border of Munger, 20 km from Jamui Railway Station, 45 kilometers from the Bariarpur railway station, and 200 km from Patna Airport.

Bhimbandh is situated south of the Ganges River, at the northern edge of Chota Nagpur Plateau and west of Santhal Pargana. it is surrounded on all sides by densely inhabited non-forestry areas. In the valley portions and at the foothills are several hot springs of which the finest are at Bhimbandh, Sita Kund and Rishi Kund. All the hot springs maintain nearly almost same temperature all year round. Of them, the Bhimbandh springs have the hottest temperature (52 °C to 65 °C) and discharge (0.84-1.12 cum/sec) and constitute the best area for the exploration of geothermal energy potential.

There are number of places of tourist interest near the Sanctuary, including Rishi Kund, Sita Kund, Ha-Ha Punch Kumari, Rameshwar Kund, and Kharagpur Lake.

== Climate ==
The climate is normal for the Munger district. There are three distinct seasons in this zone, summer (March to May), monsoon (June to September) and winter (October to February). Average annual rainfall of this district is 1146 mm.

== Fauna ==
Fauna include: tiger (8), leopard (36), peafowl (637), wild bear (1063), Indian hare (507), langur (3388), monkey (1612), sahil (57), bear (96), cheetal (187), barking deer (559), Van Murgi (863), nilgai (255), python (39), gaur (39), and hyena (36) are the major fauna of the Bhimband. Other fauna include the jungle cat, fishing cat, and leopard cat. Small mammals include the rare hispid hare, Indian gray mongoose, small Indian mongooses, large Indian civet, small Indian civets, Bengal fox, golden jackal, sloth bear, Chinese pangolin, Indian pangolins, hog badger, Chinese ferret badgers, and particolored flying squirrel.

Crocodiles are found in Kharagpur lake and Kalidah near Rameshwar kund. Among snakes, cobra and kraits are of common occurrence while pythons are occasionally seen.

Common bird species are peafowl, grey partridge, quail, Malabar hornbill, pied hornbill, swallow, nightjars, drongo, paradise flycatcher, kingfisher, bulbul, mynas, pigeon, wood pigeon, blue jay, owl, falcon, kite, eastern imperial eagle, greater spotted eagle, white-tailed eagle, Pallas's fish eagle, grey-headed fish eagle, lesser kestrel and vulture.

Birds such as the lesser white-fronted goose, ferruginous duck, Baer's pochard duck and lesser adjutant, greater adjutant, black-necked stork, and Asian openbill stork migrate from Central Asia to the park during winter.

The main animals found at Bhimbandh Wildlife Sanctuary are tigers, panthers, wild boars, sloth bear, sambar deer, chitals, four-horned antelope and nilgais. However, the sanctuary is more famous for its bird life rather than the land animals. It is home to more than 100 species of resident birds, which stay here all year around. The number increases in the winter migratory season when there is an influx of birds from the Central Asia region.

== Flora ==
Biomes present in Bhimbandh includes grassland and forest. The sanctuary area has mainly sal forest, forest, Bamboo forest, grassland and many small forests of many miscellaneous species of flora. The top canopy of Bhimbandh mainly consists Shorea robusta (sal), Diospyros melanoxylon (kendu), Boswellia serrata (salai), Terminalia tomentosa (Asan), Terminalia belliriica (Bahera), Terminalia arjuna (Arjun), Pterocarpus marsupium (Paisar). The top canopy of Bhimbandh mainly Madhuca indica (Mahua) and Holarrhena antidysenterica. Bhimbandh's ground Flora includes Flemengia chappar and Zizyphus xylopyrus. climber flora include Bauhinia vahlii and Smilex protifrera. Creeper flora includes Butea superba and Butea parviflora.

== Administration ==
Administered under Munger district, this village lies within the Gangta police station, has an area of 4137 acres. The villagers in Bhimbandh are mainly engaged in the field of agriculture. The Government of Bihar recently allotted Rs 9 crore for the promotion of tourism in the area. Bihar chief minister Nitish Kumar visited in 2017 and instructed the officials to channel the hot spring to use in irrigation.

== Transport ==
Visitors can access this place by road from Munger town or from Bhagalpur Junction Railway Station. Bariarpur railway station on Jamalpur Bhagalpur section is the nearest railway station as also the nearest road link on NH 80. From Bariarpur there is a direct road to Haveli Kharagpur. There are private taxi services from Haveli Kharagpur to Bhimbandh. One can also take taxi from Jamui railway station.

Road Route: Bariarpur - galimpur - Kharagpur - Gangta - Bhimbandh - Jamui.
