= Ghorghat Halt railway station =

Railway station in Bihar, India

Ghorghat Halt

General information
- Location: National Highway 80, Ghorghat, Karhariya, Munger district, Bihar; India
- Coordinates: 25°14′33″N 86°37′40″E
- Elevation: 40 m (130 ft)
- System: Passenger train station
- Owner: Indian Railways
- Operator: Eastern Railway zone
- Line: Sahibganj loop line
- Platforms: 2
- Tracks: 2

Construction
- Structure type: Standard (on ground station)

Other information
- Status: Active
- Station code: GOG
- Zone(s): Eastern Railway zone
- Division(s): Malda

History
- Former names: East Indian Railway Company

Services
| Preceding station | Indian Railways | Following station |
|---|---|---|
| Khariapipra Halt towards Khana | Eastern Railway zone Sahibganj loop | Kalyanpur Road towards Kiul Junction |
Location

Ghorghat Halt railway station is a halt railway station on Sahibganj loop line under the Malda railway division of Eastern Railway zone. It is situated beside National Highway 80 at Ghorghat, Karhariya in Munger district in the Indian state of Bihar.
