= Adarshgram =

Village in Munger district, Bihar, India

Coordinates: 25°26′29″N 86°32′37″E

Adarshgram tikarampur is a village located in the Mahauli panchayat of Munger district, Bihar state, India.
