= Swarndih =

Village in Bihar, India

Swarndih, formerly Sondhia, is a small village in the Indian state of Bihar.

== Transportation ==
The nearest railway station is Sultanganj.

== Nearby Localities ==
- Tarapur
- Sultanganj
- Deoghar
- Munger

Today, Swarndih is known for its educational facilities and relative prosperity. Swarndih is rich in culture and crops. It is a growing village, with a lot of information technology. The village has various cultural activities like Saraswati Puja and the plays performed in Sarawati Puja, spirituality, Traditional Song of Holi, sports, and literature. These activities and job opportunities attract migrants. Other jobs include IT, Banking and private businesses.

== Schools ==
Swarndih has one primary school.
