= Binda Diara =

Village in Bihar, India

- Village
- Location within Bihar Location within India
- Coordinates: 25°18′47″N 86°33′42″E
- Country: India
- State: Bihar
- District: Munger
- Block: Bariarpur

Government
  - Type: Sarpanch

Area
  - Total: 11.28 km^{2} (4.36 sq mi)
- Elevation: 40 m (130 ft)

Population (2011)
  - Total: 32,488
  - Density: 2,880/km^{2} (7,460/sq mi)

Languages
  - Common: Angika, Hindi
- Time zone: UTC+5:30 (IST)
- PIN: 851203
- STD code: 06344
- Vehicle registration: BR-08

Binda Diara, or Binda Diyara, is a village in the Indian state of Bihar. Located in Bariarpur Block of northern Munger District, it is about 11 kilometres southeast of the district capital Munger. As of the 2011 census, the population of this village was 32,488.

== Geography ==
Binda Diara is in the south bank of the Ganges River, with the National Highway 33 passing through it. The village covers a total area of 11278 hectares.

== Demographics ==
In 2011, there were 32,488 total residents and 5,950 households within Binda Diara. Out of the local residents, 17,574 were males and 14,914 were females. 30.38% of the total population consisted of the working population. The literacy rate was 38.11%, with 7,868 of the male residents and 4,513 of the female residents being literate.
