= Kutlupur Diara =

Village in Bihar, India

Coordinates: 25.317°N 86.342°E

Kutlupur Diara, also spelled Diyara, is a village in the Munger Sadar sub-division of the Munger district in Bihar, India. According to the 2011 census it had 12,104 inhabitants.

The village's biggest accomplishment is in its use of non-conventional energy. For example, all the villagers rely on solar panels as state government couldn't ensure electricity lines to village till 2010. In 2013, the village was flooded.
