= Nauagarhi =

Village in Bihar, India

- Village
- Location within Bihar
- Coordinates: 25°20′37″N 86°32′06″E
- Country: India
- State: Bihar
- District: Munger
- Block: Munger

Government
  - Type: Sarpanch

Area
  - Total: 8.12 km^{2} (3.14 sq mi)
- Elevation: 50 m (160 ft)

Population (2011)
  - Total: 34,356
  - Density: 4,230/km^{2} (11,000/sq mi)

Languages
  - Official: Hindi
- Time zone: UTC+5:30 (IST)
- PIN: 811211
- STD code: 06344
- Vehicle registration: BR-08

Nauagarhi is a village in Munger District, Bihar, India. It is situated on the northern portion of Munger District. The village had a population of 34,356 as of the 2011 census.

== Geography ==
Nauagarhi is located on the southern bank of the Ganges River, with the National Highway 33 passing through it. The village has a total area of 812 hectares.

== Demographics ==
At the 2011 census, Nauagarhi had a population of 34,356. The male population was 18,359, and the female population was 15,997. The working population constituted 28.08% of the total residents. The village's literacy rate stood at 60.52%, with 12,370 of the male residents and 8,422 of the female residents being literate.
