= Kalavati Devi =

Award winning toilet builder in India

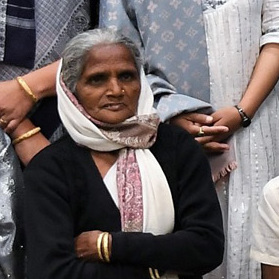
- Devi in March 2020
- Born: c. 1965 (age 60–61); Sitapur, Uttar Pradesh, India
- Occupation: Mason
- Known for: Building 4,000 toilets
- Spouse: Jairaj Singh
- Children: Two daughters

Kalavati Devi (born c. 1965) is an Indian mason who became a toilet builder in Kanpur. She transformed her own community by installing a 50-seat toilet and then moved to other communities. She has helped build 4,000 toilets improving the lot particularly for women and children. In 2019 she was awarded the Nari Shakti Puraskar, an award given to the women or institutions working for women empowerment

== Life ==
Devi was born in the 1960s and her background is in Sitapur. She came to Raja purwa near j k temple Kanpur when she was 14 to marry Jairaj Singh who was 18. One of her husband's jobs was to work as a floor cutter for a non-profit group called Shramik Bharti.

They lived in Raja Purwa Kanpur and she was disgusted by people defecating in the street. She said it was a "living hell" and that she intended to improve the cleanliness of her area. Her husband was supportive and, when she decided that she was going to build toilets in her area, he went with her to meet Shramik Bharti. They were keen on the idea of building a 10–20 seat facility. Local corporations were approached and they offered to find 200,000 rupees if she could raise 100,000. She tried, and she did raise a good sum and more importantly enthusiasm for the idea. Eventually there was a 50-seat facility.

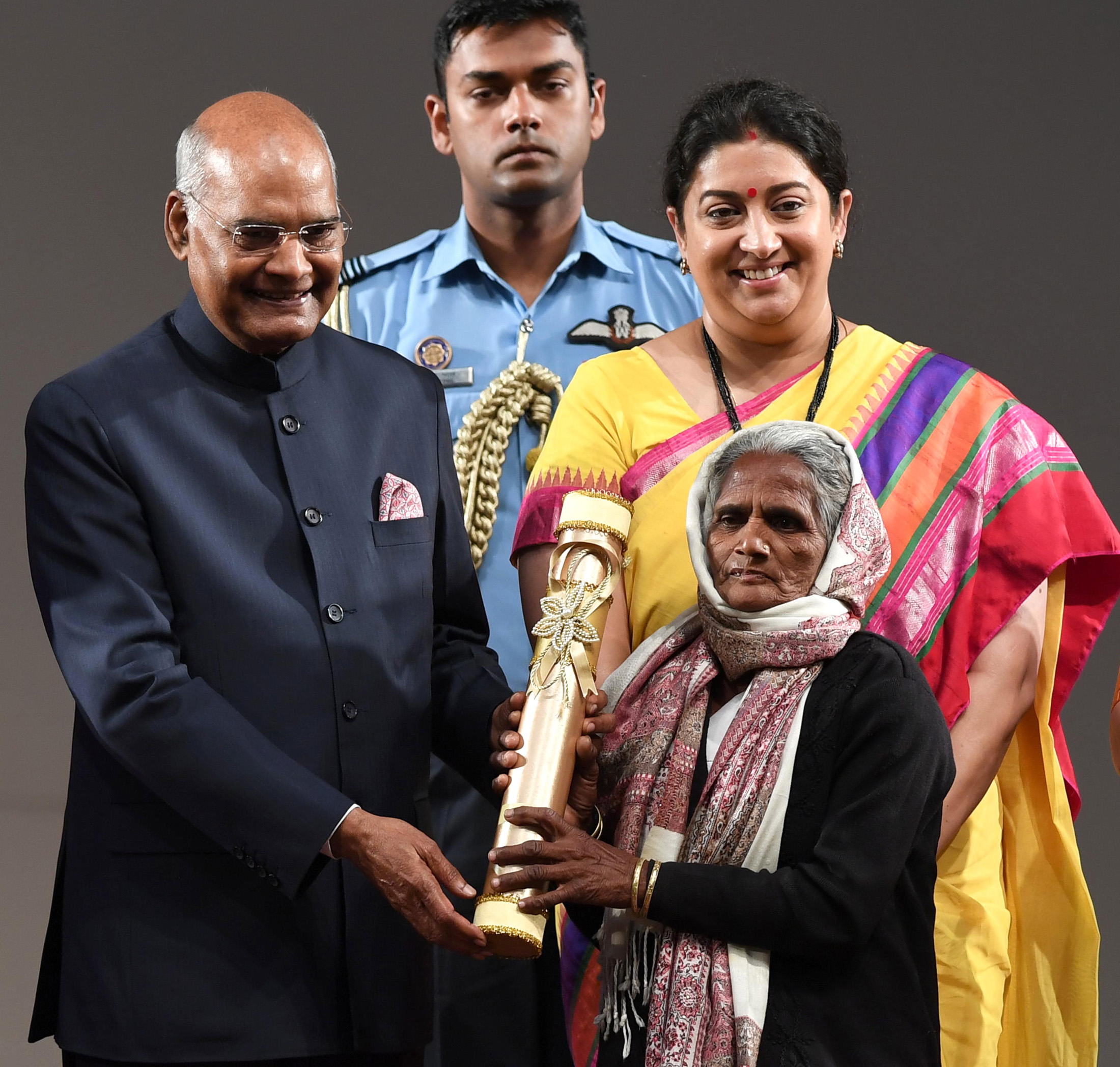
President Ram Nath Kovind presenting the Nari Shakti Puraskar to her

She had found her role, but she wanted to do more than fund raise and organise so she decided to become a mason and Shramik Bharti found funds to assist her training.

Both her husband and son-in-law died leaving her as the sole wage earner who had to provide for her daughter and two grandchildren. In 2015 she was working in the shanty town of Rakhi Mandi where 700 families lived without a single toilet. Devi offered to help and persuaded WaterAid to help fund some toilets. The local community were unwilling to give land or finances as they were happy with their lot and they feared that there must be a secret agenda to the offer of help. This was despite the open sewers, children and adults having to defaecate in the street and anecdotal talk of assaults and a rape. She went out to build the toilets having to walk some days in pouring rain for 5 km after taking two bus rides.

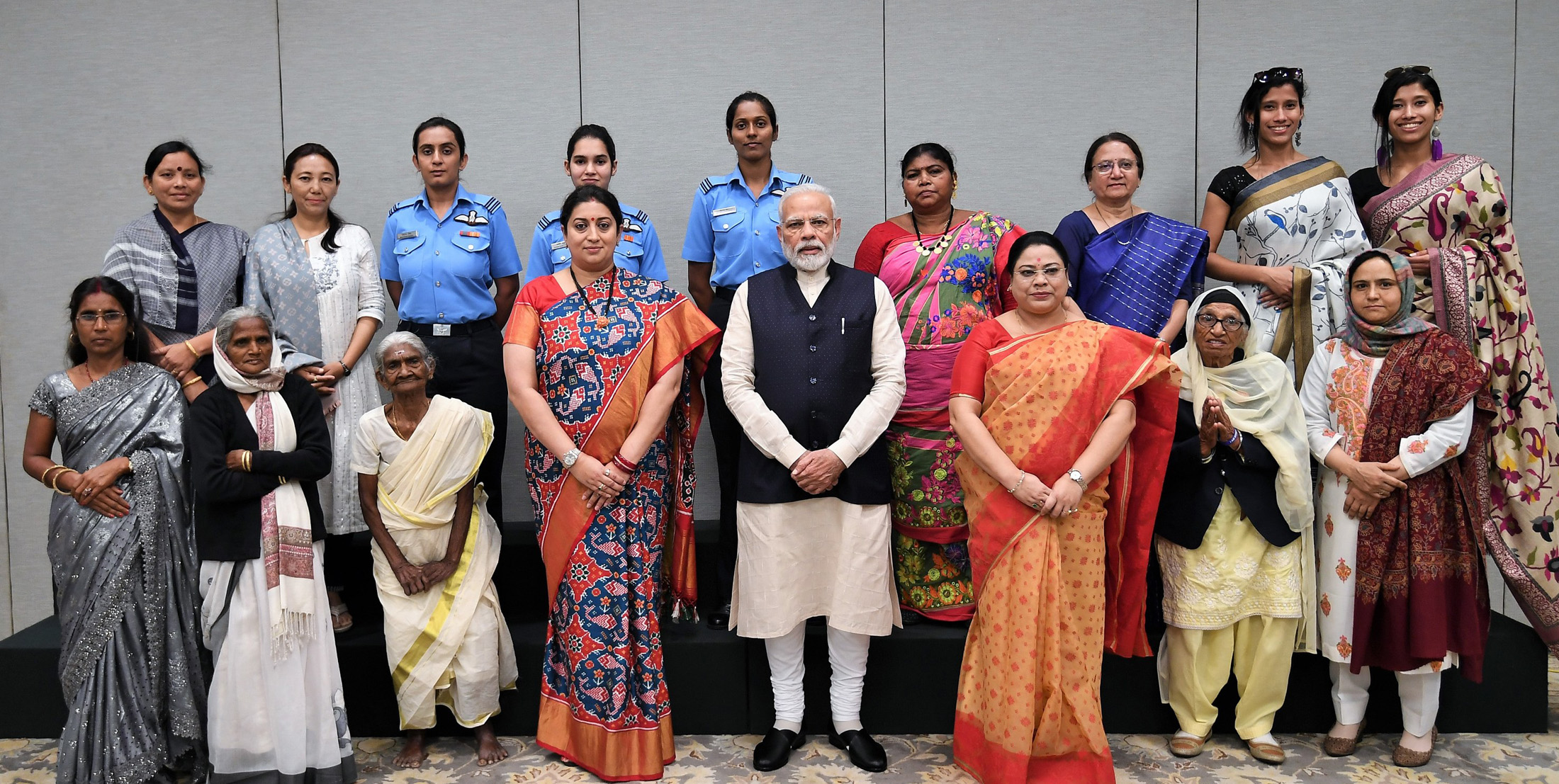
Prime Minister Narendra Modi with the Nari Shakti Awardees on International Women's Day in 2020. Devi is front, far left but one

On International Women's Day in 2020 she took over the Indian Prime Minister's Twitter account. She was one of what the Prime Minister nicknamed the "magnificent seven" who tweeted in his name that day. Seven were chosen to tweet but the awardees were Padala Bhudevi, Bina Devi, Arifa Jan, Chami Murmu, Nilza Wangmo, Rashmi Urdhwareshe, Mann Kaur, Kaushiki Chakroborty, Avani Chaturvedi, Bhawana Kanth, Mohana Singh Jitarwal, Bhageerathi Amma, Karthyayani Amma and Devi. Her work was recognised when the President Ram Nath Kovind awarded her one of twelve Nari Shakti Puraskar awards. The awards were made on International Women's Day in New Delhi.

== History ==
Kalavati Devi won the award as a woman mason building toilets. Another woman Sunita Devi had won the same award for similar work, the year before, for her work in Jharkhand.
