= Khariapipra Halt railway station =

Railway station in Bihar, India

Khariapipra Halt

General information
- Location: National Highway 80, Kharia, Munger district, Bihar; India
- Coordinates: 25°14′12″N 86°38′42″E
- Elevation: 40 m (130 ft)
- System: Passenger train station
- Owner: Indian Railways
- Operator: Eastern Railway zone
- Line: Sahibganj loop line
- Platforms: 2
- Tracks: 2

Construction
- Structure type: Standard (on ground station)

Other information
- Status: Active
- Station code: KAPP
- Zone(s): Eastern Railway zone
- Division(s): Malda

History
- Former names: East Indian Railway Company

Services
Preceding station	Indian Railways	Following station
Ganganiyan towards Khana	Eastern Railway zone Sahibganj loop	Ghorghat Halt towards Kiul Junction
Location

Khariapipra Halt railway station is a halt railway station on Sahibganj loop line under the Malda railway division of Eastern Railway zone. It is situated beside National Highway 80 at Kharia in Munger district in the Indian state of Bihar.
