= K. C. Surendra Babu =

Indian Police Service Officer

K.C. Surendra Babu was an Indian Police Service Officer who was killed by Maoists in Bihar in 2005. At the time of his killing he was superintendent of police of Munger district. A 1997 batch IPS Surendra Babu along with his five bodyguards were killed in a landmine explosion triggered by the Maoists on 5 January 2005 inside Bhim Bandh wildlife sanctuary.
