= Jamalpur, Bihar Assembly constituency =

Assembly constituency in Bihar

Jamalpur (Bihar)
- Constituency No. 166 for the Bihar Legislative Assembly

Constituency details
- Country: India
- Region: East India
- State: Bihar
- District: Munger
- Established: 1951
- Total electors: 330,571

Member of Legislative Assembly
- 18th Bihar Legislative Assembly
- Incumbent Nachiketa Mandal
- Party: JD(U)
- Alliance: NDA
- Elected year: 2025

Jamalpur is one of 243 constituencies of legislative assembly of Bihar. It is part of Munger Lok Sabha constituency along with other assembly constituencies viz. Suryagarha, Munger and Lakhisarai.

== Overview ==
Jamalpur comprises CD Blocks Jamalpur & Dharhara; Gram Panchayats Teliyadih, Naki, Bahira, Agrahan, Barhouna, Gobadda, Kouriya, Baijalpur, Muderi, Rataitha & Barui of Kharagpur CD Block.

== Members of the Legislative Assembly ==
Election	Name	Party
1952	Yogendra Mahato	Indian National Congress
1957	Yogendra Mahato	Indian National Congress
1962	Yogendra Mahato	Indian National Congress
1967	B. P. Yadav	Samyukta Socialist Party
1969	Ram Balak Singh	Communist Party of India
1972	Suresh Kumar Singh	Bharatiya Jana Sangh
1977	Suresh Kumar Singh	Janata Party
1980	Upendra Prasad Verma	Janata Party
1985	Upendra Prasad Verma	Lok Dal
1990	Upendra Prasad Verma	Janata Dal
1995	Upendra Prasad Verma	Janata Dal
2000	Upendra Prasad Verma	Rashtriya Janata Dal
2005	Shailesh Kumar	Janata Dal (United)
2005	Shailesh Kumar	Janata Dal (United)
2010	Shailesh Kumar	Janata Dal (United)
2015	Shailesh Kumar	Janata Dal (United)
2020	Ajay Kumar Singh	Indian National Congress
2025	Nachiketa Mandal	Janata Dal (United)

== Election results ==
=== 2025 ===
2025 Bihar Legislative Assembly election: Jamalpur
Party	Candidate	Votes	%	±%
JD(U)	Nachiketa Mandal	96,683	48.0	+13.27
IIP	Narendra Kumar	60,455	30.01	
Independent	Shivdeep W Lande	15,655	7.77	
Independent	Shailesh Kumar	14,218	7.06	
JSP	Lalan Jee	3,863	1.92	
NOTA	None of the above	1,777	0.88	−0.48
Majority		36,228	17.99	+15.07
Turnout		201,422	60.93	+14.32
JD(U) gain from INC		Swing		

=== 2020 ===
2020 Bihar Legislative Assembly election: Jamalpur
Party	Candidate	Votes	%	±%
INC	Ajay Kumar Singh	57,196	37.65	
JD(U)	Shailesh Kumar	52,764	34.73	−10.95
LJP	Durgesh Kumar Singh	14,643	9.64	−25.53
BSP	Subodh Tanti	4,383	2.89	+1.33
Independent	Pankaj Kumar	3,281	2.16	
Independent	Dolly Kumari	2,650	1.74	
Independent	Pappu Yadav	1,882	1.24	
JAP(L)	Mahesh Yadav	1,840	1.21	
Independent	Dhirendra Kumar	1,811	1.19	
SUCI(C)	Kameshwar Ram	1,477	0.97	+0.36
Independent	Deepak Kumar Raut	1,452	0.96	
NOTA	None of the above	2,072	1.36	−1.25
Majority		4,432	2.92	−7.59
Turnout		151,910	46.61	−3.08
INC gain from JD(U)		Swing		

=== 2015 ===
2015 Bihar Legislative Assembly election: Jamalpur
Party	Candidate	Votes	%	±%
JD(U)	Shailesh Kumar	67,273	45.68	
LJP	Himanshu Kunvar	51,797	35.17	
SS	Sanjay Kumar Singh	8,228	5.59	
Independent	Rajiv Nayak	2,604	1.77	
Independent	Sanjay Singh Yadav	2,471	1.68	
BSP	Kapildeo Das	2,290	1.56	
Independent	Chandra Narayan Singh	2,026	1.38	
SP	Pappu Yadav	1,665	1.13	
Vyabasayi Kisan Alpasankhyak Morcha	Nitya Nand Choudhary	1,482	1.01	
Independent	Arjun Kushwaha	1,454	0.99	
NOTA	None of the above	3,847	2.61	
Majority		15,476	10.51	
Turnout		147,258	49.69	

== See also ==
- List of Assembly constituencies of Bihar
