= Sunita Devi (mason) =

Indian mason honoured for building toilets

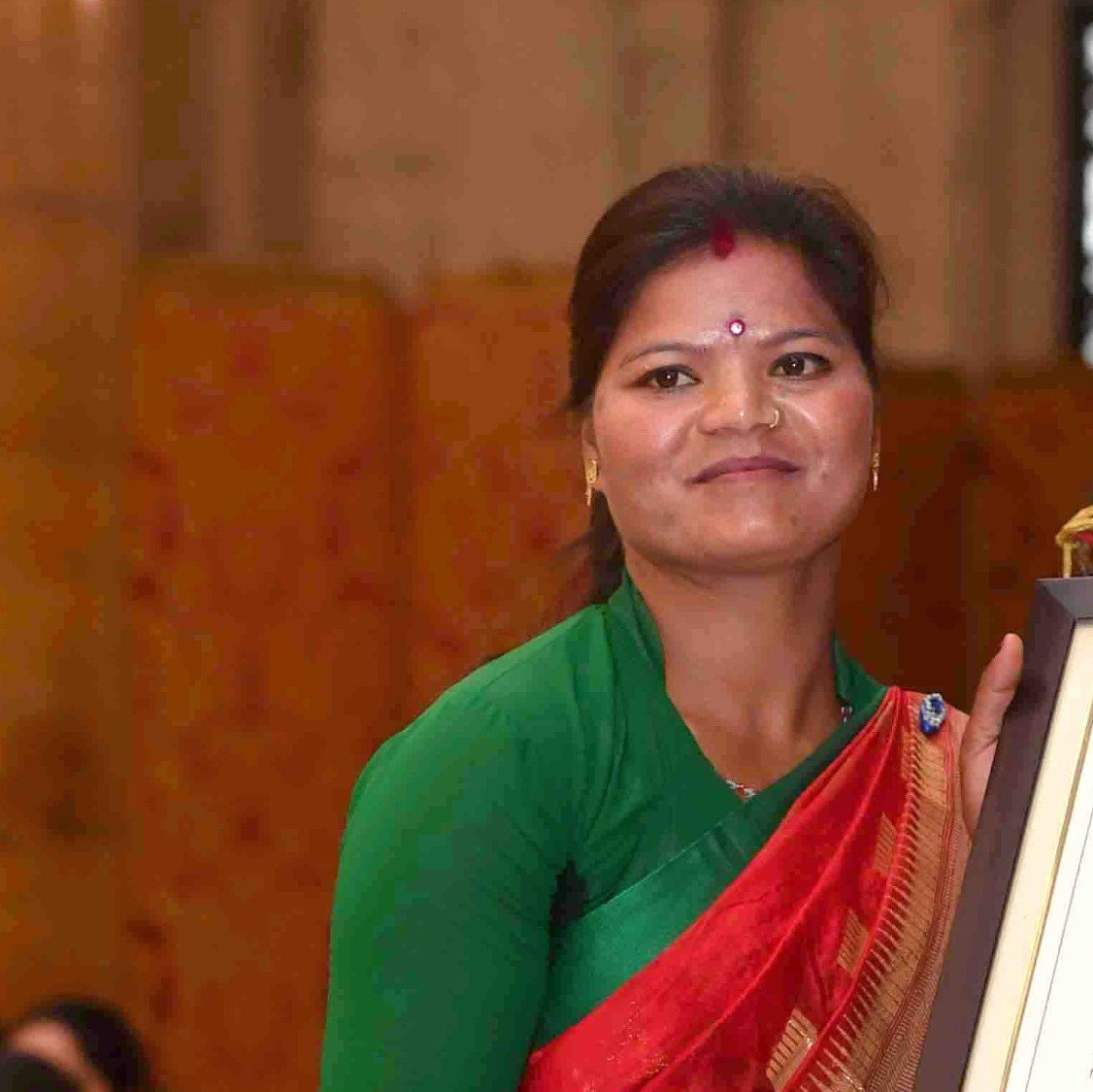
- Born: 1980 (age 45–46); New Delhi, India
- Occupation: mason
- Known for: building toilets

Sunita Devi (born 1980) is an Indian mason honoured for building toilets. In her village 90% of the women did not have access to a toilet. After her work they all now have access. She was given the Nari Shakti Puraskar award in 2019 by the President of India.

== Life ==
Devi was born in 1980. She graduated with a degree in political science. She was surprised to find that after she married in 2010 her new home did not have a working toilet. Her village, Udaypura, was 115 km from the state capital Ranchi. Neighbours in her village were in a similar situation but she was unable to raise this as a problem because of etiquette. Only 10% of the women had access to a toilet and the rest had to defaecate in the open.

When others including the Swachh Bharat Mission-Gramin (SBM-G) arrived in her village in 2015 and started to talk about toilets. The mission wanted to create an Open defecation free community and they were offering a grant of 12,000 rupees for each toilet constructed by a rural family.

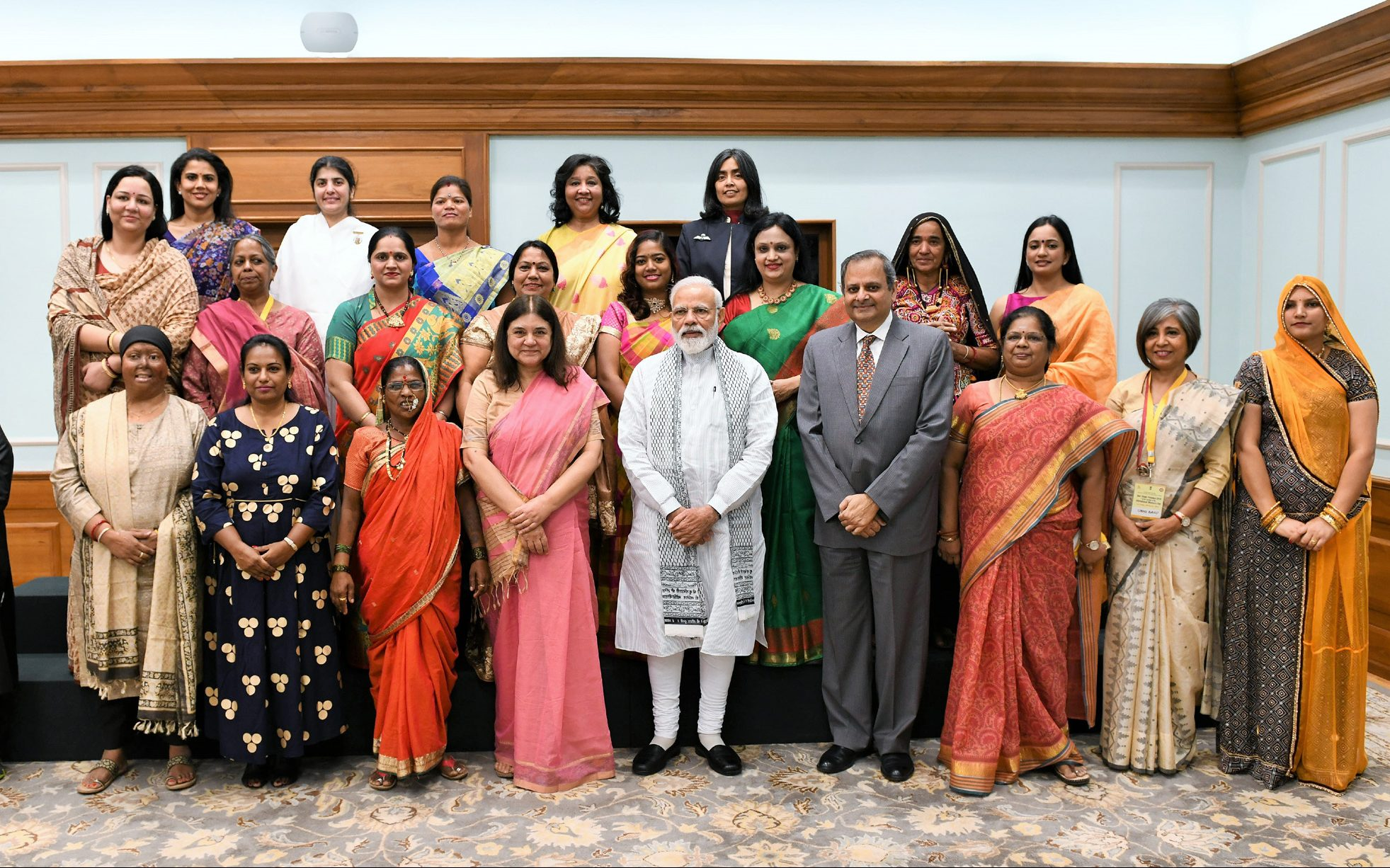
Recipients of the Nari Shakti Puraskar. Devi is in the middle of the back row

Devi took an interest. She wanted to train to be a mason but her father-in-law objected because she was a woman. The job of being a mason was done by men, although many masons considered the task of creating toilets too small to be worthy of their attention. With her husband's support she persevered and became a "Rani Mistris" (woman mason). There was opposition and some asked to leave Udaypura when she tried to interest other women in the task. Devi was astounded that they objected to her building toilets, but they raised no objection to women defecating in the street.

She was given the Nari Shakti Puraskar award in 2019. The "2018" award was made in the Presidential Palace by the President of India on International Women's Day. A year later the President honoured another woman Kalavati Devi who had also trained as a mason to build toilets in Kanpur. At the award ceremony the Prime Minister singled out the work of the Swachh Bharat Mission which had inspired Devi to her work for particular praise.
