= Bansilalpet Stepwell =

Stepwell in Secunderabad, India

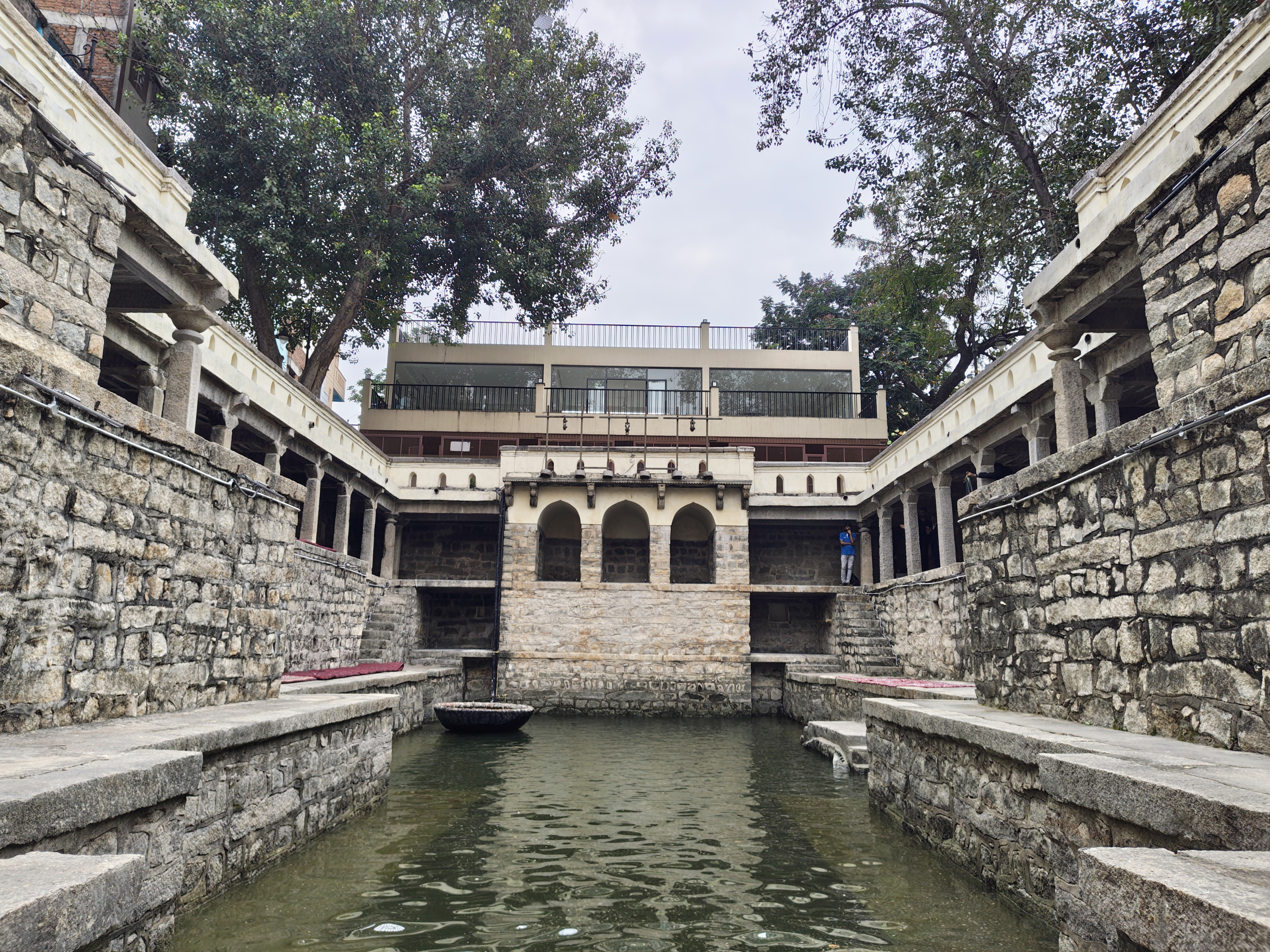
- Bansilalpet stepwell, post restoration, in 2023

- Location within Hyderabad Location within Telangana Location within India
- 17°25′50.2068″N 78°29′35.3515″E
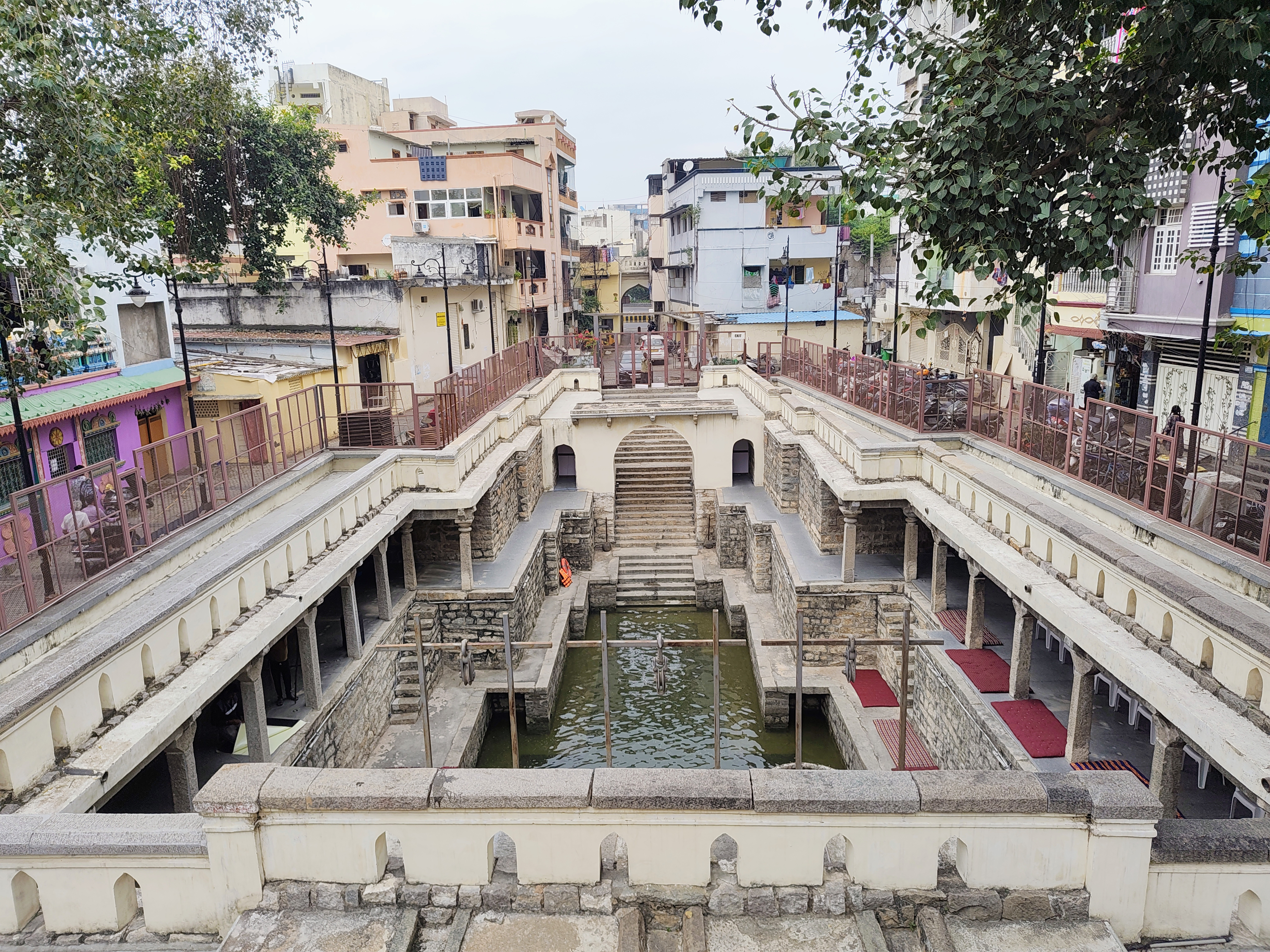
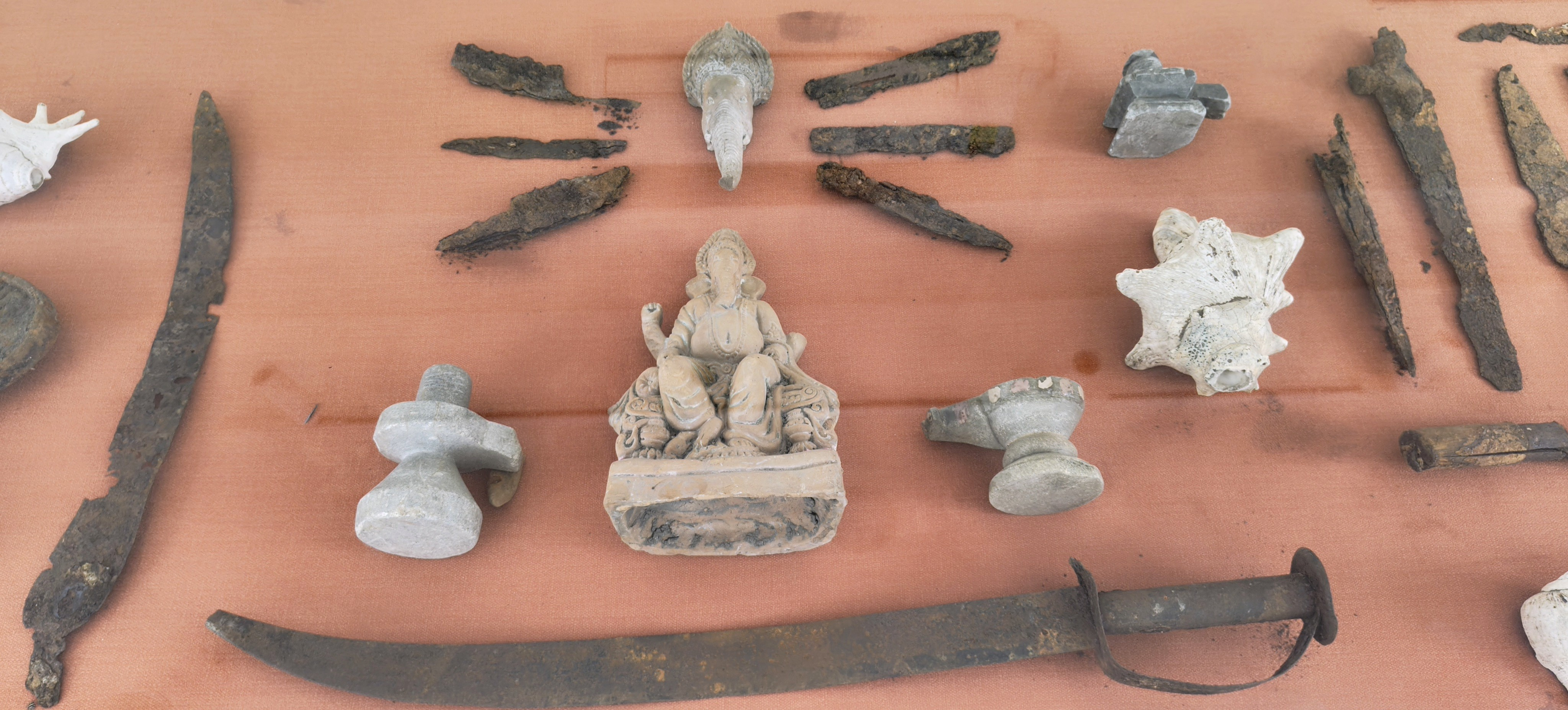
- Type: Stepwell Bansilalpet Stepwell Top View Secunderabad Telangana Aerial view of Bansilalpet Stepwell Artefacts on display at the gallery in Bansilalpet stepwell 3
- Location: Secunderabad, India

History
- Built: 17th-century

Site notes
- Restored: December 5, 2022

Bansilalpet Stepwell, also known as Nagannakunta, is a 17th-century stepwell in Hyderabad, India. It was restored in 2022 by the Greater Hyderabad Municipal Corporation and The Rainwater Project.

== History ==
The exact date when the well was built is not exactly known. It is assumed that the well was built around 17th century during the Asif-Jahi period. The stepwell remained in use well into the 20th century, acting as one of the sources of water for the Gandhi Hospital. The stepwell was earlier known as Naganah Kunta as per a map published in 1954. It also noted that there was a garden of tamarind and palmyra trees surrounding the stepwell. In 1933, the area surrounding the well was developed into a residential area. The development of this project was funded by a local businessman, Seth Bansilal, after which Naganah Kunta was renamed as Bansilalpet Baori. The stepwell fell into disuse in the 1980s after a few suicides at the well.

=== Restoration ===
The well was restored in 2022 by the Greater Hyderabad Municipal Corporation and The Rainwater Project, headed by Kalpana Ramesh. More than 2000 tons of debris was removed during the restoration process. The restoration uncovered a six-stage stepwell that was 50 feet (15 m) below ground. The restored stepwell was inaugurated by K. T. Rama Rao on 5 December 2022.

== Facilities ==
A cafe, three galleries, and amphitheater are located within the premises. The galleries have information about the history of the stepwell and its restoration project.
