= Shramik Bharti =

Nonprofit anti-poverty organization based in Kanpur, Uttar Pradesh, India

- Founded: 1986
- Founder: Ganesh Pandey, Usha Varkey and 5 others
- Type: Not for profit
- Location: Kanpur, Uttar Pradesh, India
- Leader: Rakesh Kumar Pandey
- Website: www.shramikbharti.org.in

Shramik Bharti is a nonprofit organization established in 1986 and headquartered in Kanpur, India. Its goal is to eradicate poverty by empowering women and disadvantaged communities.

== History ==
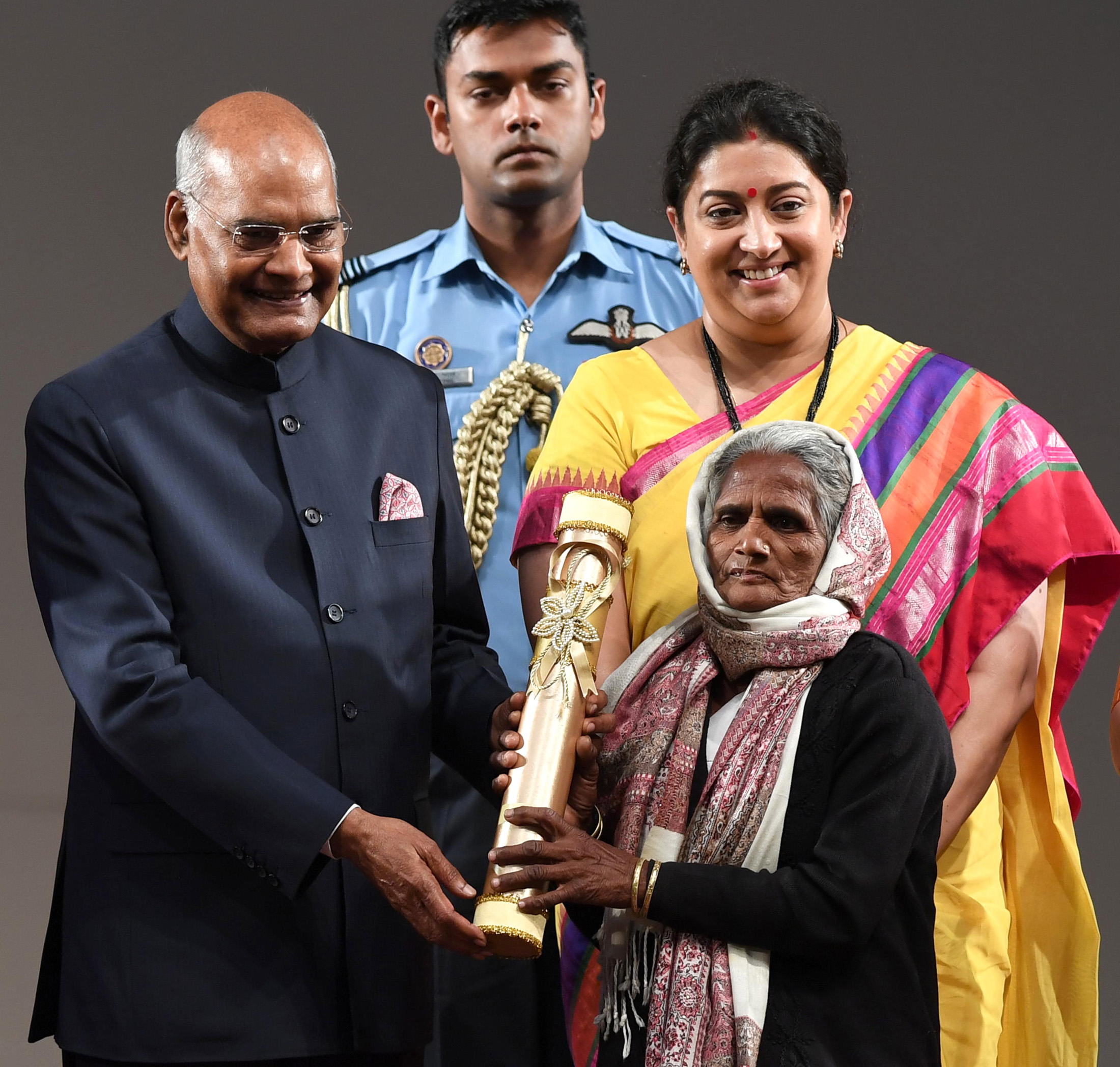
President Ram Nath Kovind presenting the Nari Shakti Puraskar to Kalavati Devi for building 4,000 toilets.

In the early 1980s, Kanpur was a hub of mills which employed 100,000 workers. During the 1982 recession, many of the mills scaled down or shut down operations. The mill workers were not well-educated and could not find other work.

== Programs ==
=== Sodic land reclamation program ===
Shramik Bharti has helped farmers learn organic methods to reclaim sodic land.

=== Water, sanitation, and hygiene ===
Shramik Bharti and WaterAid India work together on WASH projects.

=== Community radio station – Waqt Ki Awaaz ===
Shramik Bharti launched the community radio station Waqt Ki Awaaz in September 2013. The radio station sits in village Bairi Dariyav of Maitha block in Kanpur Dehat district of Uttar Pradesh; its airwaves cover a radius of 15 km and reach about 300,000 people in 300 villages. Programming is used to initiate discussion and raise issues about open defecation, alcohol addiction, elderly people, girl education, and diseases. The station broadcasts seven hours daily.

=== Community health ===
PRIME II collaborated with Shramik Bharti to implement Community Partnerships for Safe Motherhood.

== Awards and recognition ==
- GuideStarIndia Platinum award in the GuideStar India NGO Transparency Awards 2021
- Social Media for Empowerment Award 2016 for citizen journalism category by Digital Empowerment Foundation (to Waqt Ki Awaaz)
- The Manthan Award 2015 for e-community broadcasting (to Waqt Ki Awaaz)
