= Shailesh Kumar (politician) =

Indian politician

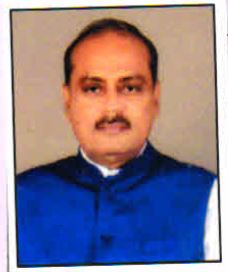

Minister of Rural Work Department of Bihar
- In office 20 November 2015 – 26 July 2017
- Chief Minister: Nitish Kumar
- In office 29 July 2017 – 16 November 2020
- Chief Minister: Nitish Kumar

Member of the Bihar Legislative Assembly

Personal details
- Born: 25 December 1963 (age 62) Bariarpur, Bihar, India
- Party: Janata Dal United
- Spouse: Nootan Sinha
- Children: 3
- Education: R.D.&D.J. College, Munger M.A.
- Profession: Politician, Social worker

Shailesh Kumar (born 25 December 1963) is an Indian politician belonging to the Janata Dal (United) who previously served as the Rural Work Department Minister of Bihar since 2015. He was elected as a member of the Bihar Legislative Assembly from Jamalpur constituency from 2005 to 2015.

== Early life ==
Shailesh Kumar was born on 25 December 1963, Bariarpur, Munger district, Bihar. His father, Late Suresh Kumar Singh was also Member of Legislative Assembly from Jamalpur constituency(Bharatiya Jana Sangh Party) for two terms in 1975 and 1977. Kumar completed his Primary education in Philip High School Bariarpur. He graduated from Sahibganj College Jharkhand and pursued his post graduation (Master of Art) from R.D.&D.J. College, Munger in 1984.

After completing his degree he became History Lecturer in Asarganj College from 1989 to 1993. He started involving in social activities from 1985. He worked in many NGOs. He was also member of Red Cross society which is a voluntary humanitarian organization to protect human life and health based in India. He married Nootan Sinha on 2 July 1993. She is from Madhusudanpur, Muzaffarpur District. They have a son and 2 daughters.

== Political career ==
In 1995, he joined Samta party under the leadership of George Fernandes and Nitish Kumar. He contested election but lost. In 2000 he again contested election as an Independent and came in second position. Under the leadership of Nitish Kumar when Janta Dal United party came to power in 2005, he was elected as Member of Assembly from Jamalpur constituency. In 2010 again he won election from the same constituency. In 2015, he became the Minister of Rural Work Department till date.

== Positions held ==
Period	Positions
1995	Contested first assembly elections on a Samta Party ticket from Jamalpur but lost
2000	Contested second assembly elections as an independent but came in second position
2005 – 2010	Member, Bihar Legislative Assembly, from Jamalpur
2010 – 2015	Member, Bihar Legislative Assembly, from Jamalpur
2015 – 2020	Rural Work Department Minister

== Election result ==
Period	Candidate	Party	Total Vote	Total Vote	RESULT
1995	Shailesh Kumar	Samata Party	22988 22.4%	30315 29.53%	Lost (7,327 Votes)
2000	Shailesh Kumar	Independent	40535 36.19%	41906 37.41%	Lost (1,371 Votes)
2005 (Feb)	Shailesh Kumar	Janata Dal (united)	45536	23986	Win
2005 (Oct)	Shailesh Kumar	Janata Dal (united)	52682	19976	Win
2010	Shailesh Kumar	Janata Dal (united)	48337 42.12%	27195 23.7%	Win
2015	Shailesh Kumar	Janata Dal (united)	67273 45.68%	51797 35.17%	Win
2020	Shailesh Kumar	Janata Dal (united)	52764 34.73%	57196 37.65%	Lost (4,432 votes)
