= Ganganiyan railway station =

Railway station in Bihar, India

Ganganiyan

General information
- Location: National Highway 80, Ganganiyan, Bhagalpur district, Bihar; India
- Coordinates: 25°14′12″N 86°39′52″E
- Elevation: 40 m (130 ft)
- System: Passenger train station
- Owner: Indian Railways
- Operator: Eastern Railway zone
- Line: Sahibganj loop line
- Platforms: 2
- Tracks: 2

Construction
- Structure type: Standard (on ground station)

Other information
- Status: Active
- Station code: GNNA
- Zone(s): Eastern Railway zone
- Division(s): Malda

History
- Former names: East Indian Railway Company

Services
Preceding station	Indian Railways	Following station
Kamarganj towards Khana	Eastern Railway zone Sahibganj loop	Khariapipra Halt towards Kiul Junction
Location

Ganganiyan railway station is a railway station on Sahibganj loop line under the Malda railway division of Eastern Railway zone. It is situated beside National Highway 80 at Ganganiyan in Bhagalpur district in the Indian state of Bihar.
