= Nachiketa Mandal =

Indian politician

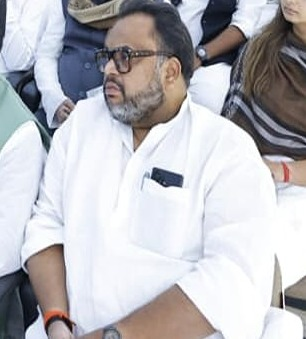

Member of the Bihar Legislative Assembly
- In office 14 November 2025 – Incumbent
- Preceded by: Ajay Kumar Singh
- Constituency: Jamalpur

Personal details
- Born: Bihar
- Party: Janata Dal (United)
- Parent: Brahmanand Mandal
- Profession: Politician

Nachiketa Mandal is an Indian politician from Bihar. He is elected as a Member of Legislative Assembly in 2025 Bihar Legislative Assembly election from Jamalpur constituency.

== Political career ==
Nachiketa Mandal won from Jamalpur constituency representing Janata Dal (United) in the 2025 Bihar Legislative Assembly election. He polled 96,683 votes and defeated his nearest rival, Narendra Kumar of Indian Inclusive Party, by a margin of 36,228 votes.
