= Nilza Wangmo =

Indian restaurant owner

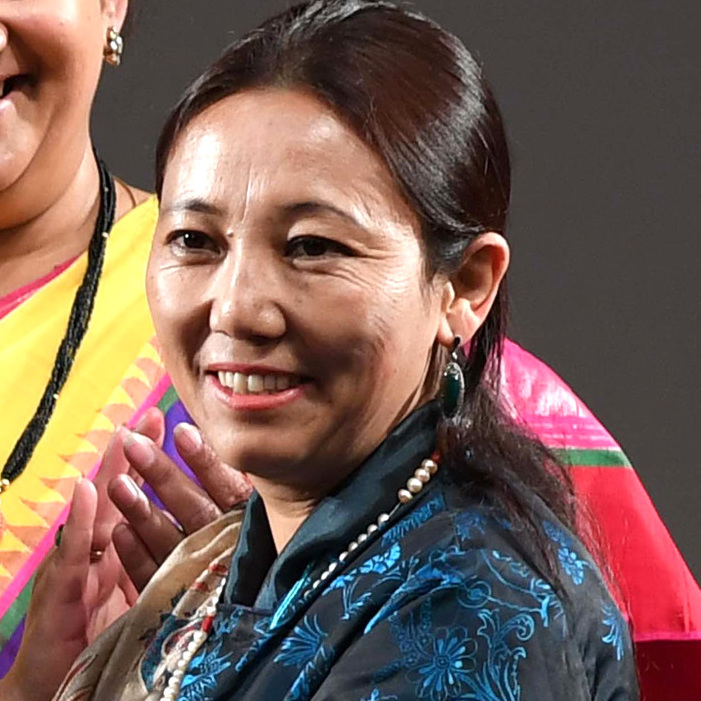
- in 2020
- Born: 1979 (age 46–47); Alchi
- Education: missionary school
- Occupation: Restaurant owner
- Known for: receiving the Nari Shakti Puraskar

Nilza Wangmo (born c. 1979) is an Indian restaurant owner and an enthusiast for the local food of the Ladakh region of northern India. Her work in 2019 was recognised with the highest award for women in India – Nari Shakti Puraskar.

== Life ==
Wangmo was born in Alchi in about 1979 after her father died. Her mothers parents took her in and was brought up in a village named "Stok". The village is in the mountains. She went to a missionary school whilst her mother worked for an NGO on low wages. Money was tight and although she entered college there was insufficient funds to keep her there. Her father's family were inhospitable and would not allow then to user her father's house. They would have been homeless if her mother's father had not paid for the construction of a home for her and her mother in Alchi. Her mother's father died in 2014.

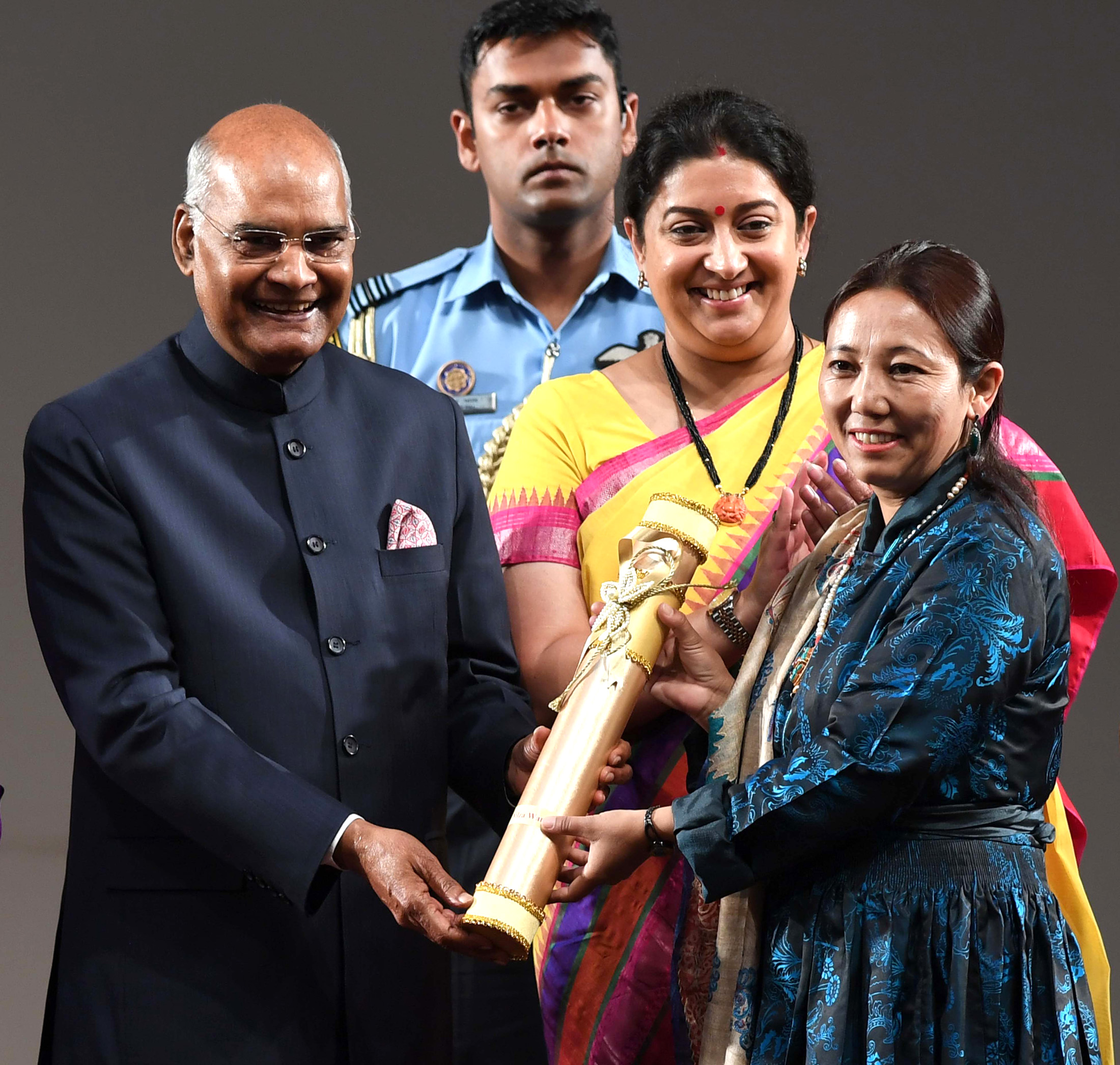
President Shri Ram Nath Kovind presenting the Nari Shakti Puraskar to Nilza Wangmo

Wangmo started a business called "Alchi Kitchen" in 2016 using a business loan. The restaurant is above their home and attracts tourists to trek and find her restaurant. They spent little money on advertising but after three years work of mouth had spread and the business was sound. Despite the popular view she believed that the food from her home region would appeal to visitors. Other restaurants served more tradition cuisine fearing that the local food tradition would be seen as too bland. She and her mother developed the menu that consists of a local pasta like product called Chutagi and the steamed dumplings called Momo. Teas based on apricot kernels and their own special blend are served and the diners sit around a wood fired oven and watch the cooks create their meal.

However her food was appreciated and in 2019 she extending her business by teaching others about how to cook "her" cuisine. She says she employs only girls or women because there is no tradition of male chefs in the area.

Her work in 2019 was recognised with the highest award for women in India. In celebration of International Women's Day in 2020 she was amongst fifteen women who were given the Nari Shakti Puraskar award by President Shri Ram Nath Kovind. It recognises women who forwarded women's empowerment. She was chosen because her work was "contributed towards safeguarding women’s rights along with pushing the 2030 Agenda for Sustainable Development Goals". The women chosen for 2020 illustrated that they had not use allowed their location, their age, their gender or lack of resource as a reason for not having and achieving their ambition.
