= Haveli Kharagpur =

- Town
- Nicknames: Haveli Kharagpur, Kharagpur
- Location in Bihar, India Haveli Kharagpur (India)
- Coordinates: 25.12°N 86.55°E
- Country: India
- State: Bihar
- District: Munger
- Subdivision: Haveli Kharagpur

Government
  - Type: Nagar Parisad
  - Body: Haveli Kharagpur Nagar Panchayat
- Elevation: 48 m (157 ft)

Population (2001)
  - Total: 26,910

Languages
  - Official: Angika, Magahi, Maithili, Hindi
- Time zone: UTC+5:30 (IST)
- Postal code: 811213

Haveli Kharagpur is a town and one of the three subdivisions in Munger district in the Indian state of Bihar.

== Geography ==
Haveli Kharagpur is located at 25.12°N 86.55°E. It has an average elevation of 48 metres (157 feet).

Kharagpur Lake is 3–4 km west of the bus stand.

== Demographics ==
As of 2001 India census, Kharagpur had a population of 26,910. Males constitute 53% of the population and females 47%. The average literacy rate is 47%, lower than the national average of 59.5%: male literacy is 55%, and female literacy is 39%. In Kharagpur, 18% of the population is under 6 years of age.

== Notable people ==
The painter Nandalal Bose was born in Haveli Kharagpur.

Bina Devi is an organic farming advocate.

Upasni Maharaj, a religious leader, spent a year in Haveli Kharagpur.
