= Kalpana Ramesh =

Indian designer and environmentalist

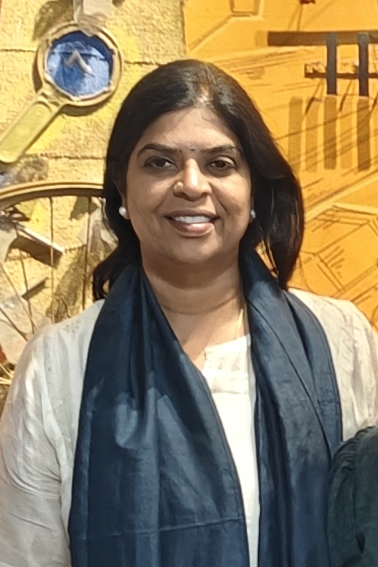
Kalpana Ramesh, Founder of The Rainwater Project, with Pavan Santosh and Nitesh Gill during a project documentation collaboration meeting at IIIT Hyderabad.

Kalpana Ramesh is an Indian interior and garden designer and environmentalist, based in Hyderabad. She is the founder and CEO of the rainwater project, a social enterprise which helps individuals and communities with sustainable rainwater harvesting, water conservation and water management. She is known as a ‘water warrior’ for her work in water conservation. She has led initiatives Save 10K bores, Live the Lakes and Blue Hyderabad. She has also revived over 25 stepwells in the state of Telangana with the support of the local administration and community participation.

== Work ==
Community Pure Water Panel discussion in Hyderabad

Ramesh moved to Hyderabad in 2000. The city was facing a severe water crisis. Local water shortages led to tankers being used to deliver chlorinated water to residential districts. Becoming interested in water self-reliance and water independence, Ramesh first tried rainwater harvesting in her own home. She used a system of nets, filters and treatments to provide water that was then clean enough to drink. Next, she successfully recycled grey water for use in her garden. Her household became water tanker free and water positive. Ramesh convinced her housing association to try these methods too. Ramesh then aimed to scale up these methods, block by block, until it was a city-wide endeavour encouraging awareness that unless something was done the city might run out of water completely in ten years’ time.

In 2015, Ramesh joined the NGO the Society for Advancement of Human Endeavor (SAHE) and led their water conservation work, becoming known as a 'water warrior'.

At that time there was a local endeavour to document the hundred or so stepwells of Telangana. Stepwells were built throughout India between the eleventh and eighteenth centuries, abandoned under British rule due to hygiene concerns, and are now often used as rubbish dumps. Ramesh and the Rainwater Project, with the support of the Telangana Municipal Administration and Urban Development Department, have now revived 25 stepwells so that they are sustainable water sources. The Bansilalpet Stepwell, for example, also known as Nagannakunta, is a 17th-century stepwell that was restored in 2022 by the Greater Hyderabad Municipal Corporation and The Rainwater Project. Ramesh also worked with the Hyderabad Metropolitan Water Supply and Sewerage Board (HMWSSB) for three months on a water saving campaign plan. After attending workshops and talking with government officials and water management specialists, Ramesh found out that ground water sources were drying up and that water shortages throughout the city were acute. Lakes in Hyderabad are the largest water catchment sites, given the amount of land given over to building and development. Ramesh thus started the ‘Live the Lakes’ initiative with SAHE by concentrating first on restoring the dead, eight-acre, Kudikunta lake, cleaning up plastic, animal waste and sewage. SAHE and Ramesh have now drawn up individual strategies for each of over 60 lakes in the Hyderabad area and, with community, government and NGO support, have formed a Lake Protection Committee. Ramesh also created the Save10KBores conservation project, encouraging over 200 families to revive their defunct boreholes.

The ‘Rainwater Project’, understanding that community awareness of the water crisis is key, encourages school students to come up with conservation ideas and also involves restaurants, theatres, and colleges in block by block rainwater harvesting, waste water saving and recycling.

== Awards ==
In 2020, Ramesh was one of the ‘Magnificent seven’ women entrusted with handling the Prime Minister of India’s social media accounts on International Women’s Day.

Ramesh gained the Stree Shakti Water Conservation Hero Award in 2025.
