= Tarapur, Bihar =

Tarapur
- city
- Location in Bihar, India
- Coordinates: 25.38°N 86.47°E
- Country: India
- State: Bihar
- District: Munger

Government
  - Type: Nagar Panchayat
  - Body: Tarapur Nagar Panchayat

Languages
  - Official: Angika, Hindi
- Time zone: UTC+5:30 (IST)
- Postal code: 813221
- ISO 3166 code: IN-BR
- Vehicle registration: BR-08

Tarapur is a town and one of the three sub-divisions in Munger district in the Indian state of Bihar. It is centrally located and connects cities like Bhagalpur, Munger, Banka, Jamui and Deoghar.

== Geography ==
Tarapur is a Sub-division under Munger District. It's a division of Water-wage and irrigation department. It also has a division Of kada vibhag (Government office). Tarapur is a Sub-Urban Market which serves all the necessities and requirements of nearby villages.

== Economy ==
The main occupation of people residing around Tarapur is agriculture. Paddy, wheat, corn, pulses, sugarcane, and other cereals are grown here. Katarni Chura (flattened rice) and mangoes from this region are also famous. It is a market and educational hub for nearby villages. Tarapur has been growing as an administrative unit as well as a commercial centre in Munger district.

== Education ==
Tarapur has about 10–15 educational institutes and one college "R S College" affiliated to Munger University, Munger. A number of students from the remote area, specifically villages find this place as Educational Hub. Private schools in Tarapur are run by educational trusts or individuals as well. Paramount Academy, Morning Glory Public School, are some of the prominent private schools of the area.

== Entertainment ==
Currently, no movie theater is operating in this city. The market in the evening has a lot of rush from different parts of villages for marketing and this crowd serves the same purpose of entertainment.

== Culture ==
The town is festively decorated every year during Shrawani Mela, a month-long religious carnival where devotees go to the historic Shiva temple in Deoghar after taking the holy water from the "utrawahini" Ganga in Sultanganj. The Tarapur name comes from historically famous temple, Tareshwar Nath Mahadev (locally known as Ulta Nath Mahadev).

== Transportation ==
The nearest railway station is in the city of Sultanganj. Various buses also run for different cities of Jharkhand like Dhanbad and Bokaro Steel City.

== Important historical events ==
On 15 February 1932, 4000 people gathered at the Tarapur police station, trying to raise the flag of the Indian National Congress there and to celebrate the day as Flag Satyagraha diwas. The police shot at the crowd, among whom were a number of people who had also been active in the civil disobedience movement that led to the Salt March of 1930. Known victims include Asarfi Mandal, Basant Dhanuk, Gaiwi Mandal, and Vishwanath Singh.

On 15 February 2022 while inaugurating the Shahid Park in Tarapur police station campus, Chief Minister Nitish Kumar announced that from now on 15 February would be commemorated as a Shahid Diwas (Martyr's Day) in memory of 34 freedom fighters who were killed by police on February 15, 1932. CM said, "These freedom fighters had never got their due, even though this was the biggest massacre carried out by the British police after Jallianwala Bagh in 1919 in Amritsar."

== Notable people ==
- Nandalal Bose, a sculptor and painter born in Tarapur
