= Malvika Iyer =

Indian social activist (born 1989)

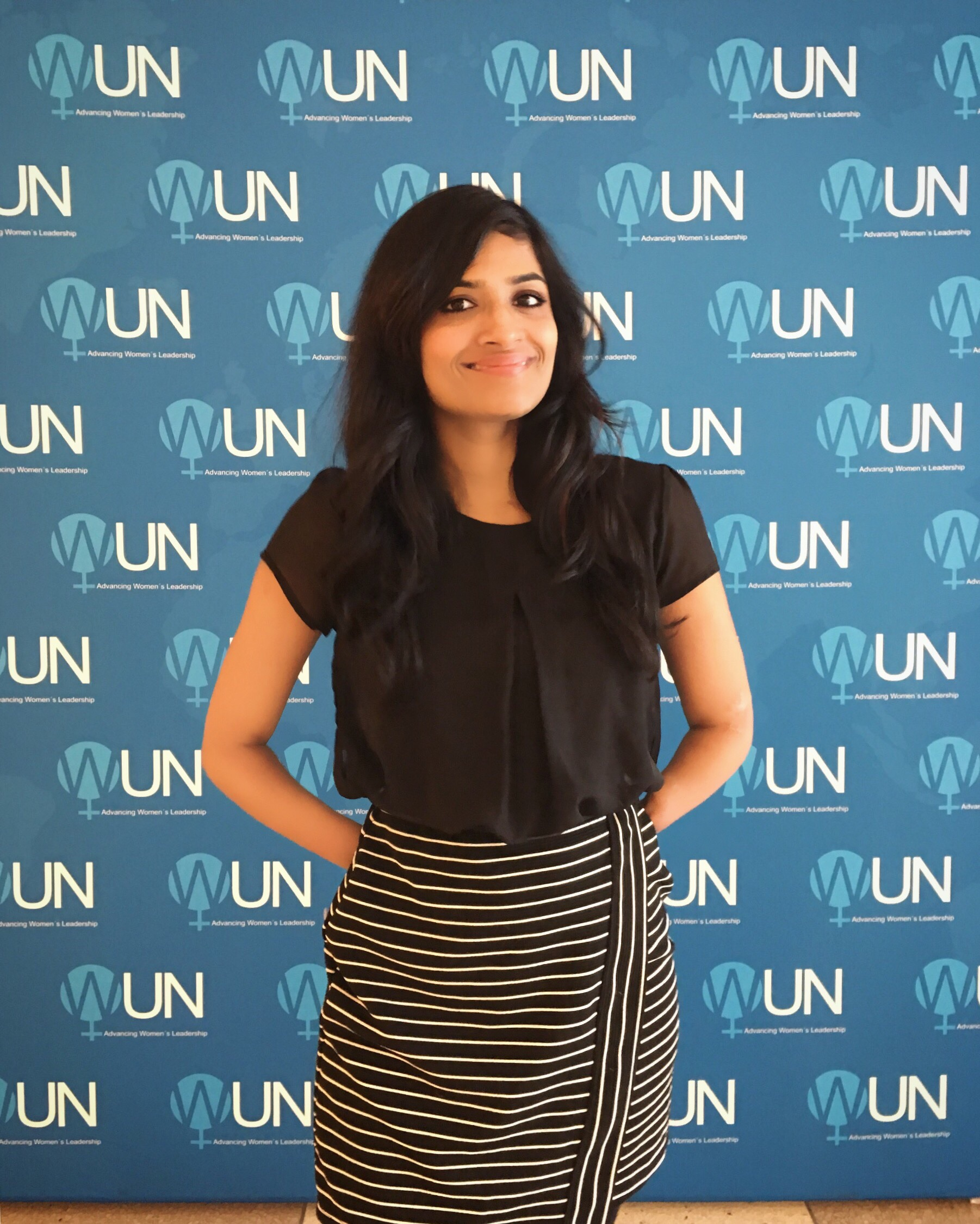
- Iyer at the Headquarters of the United Nations in New York City during the Youth Forum at the 61st session on Commission on the Status of Women in March 2017
- Born: 18 February 1989; Kumbakonam, Tamil Nadu, India
- Education: St. Stephen's College, Delhi; Delhi School of Social Work; Madras School of Social Work
- Known for: Disability rights activism

Malvika Iyer (born 18 February 1989) is a social worker and disability rights activist having lost both her hands as a child when she picked up a grenade. She is also a model for accessible fashion. Iyer obtained her doctorate in social work from Madras School of Social Work in 2017. Her doctoral thesis is on the stigmatization of people with disabilities.

== Early life and injury ==
Iyer was born on 18 February 1989 in Kumbakonam, Tamil Nadu to B. Krishnan and Hema Krishnan. She grew up in Bikaner, Rajasthan, where her father worked as an engineer at the Water Works Department. On 26 May 2002, at the age of 13, Iyer was injured in a grenade explosion, and sustained severe injuries to her legs, including multiple fractures, nerve paralysis and hypoesthesia.

== Education ==
Following her hospitalization, Iyer appeared as a private candidate in the Secondary School Leaving Certificate examination in Chennai. Writing the exam with the help of a scribe, she secured a state rank among the private candidates. She was invited to the Rashtrapati Bhavan by the then president of India, A. P. J. Abdul Kalam.

Iyer moved to New Delhi, where she studied economics (honors) at St. Stephen's College, Delhi, followed by a Master's in Social Work at the Delhi School of Social Work. She did her M.Phil. and Ph.D. in social work at the Madras School of Social Work, She completed her M.Phil. and Ph.D. in social work at the Madras School of Social Work.

== Activism ==
She hosted the India Inclusion Summit in 2013. An advocate for accessible fashion, Iyer walked the ramp as a showstopper for NIFT and Ability Foundation in Chennai where she emphasized the need for designing clothes with functionality and style for people with disability. In 2014, she was selected as a Global Shaper to the Chennai Hub of the Global Shapers Community, an initiative of the World Economic Forum. She joined the United Nations Inter-Agency Network on Youth Development's Working Group on Youth and Gender Equality and in March 2017 she was invited to deliver a speech at the United Nations in New York. In October 2017, she was invited to co-chair the World Economic Forum's India Economic Summit held at Hotel Taj Palace, New Delhi.

== Recognition ==
Iyer received the Nari Shakti Puraskar, the highest civilian honor for women for contribution to women's empowerment, from President Ram Nath Kovind on 8 March 2018 on International Women's Day. On 8 March 2020, she was selected by the Honorable Prime Minister of India Narendra Modi to take over his social media accounts. She is the recipient of the first Women in the World Emerging Leaders Award in New York in 2016.In 2015, the Deccan Chronicle included her in a list of 100 notable figures.
