= Bariarpur =

- Location in Bihar, India
- Coordinates: 25.292°N 86.571°E
- Country: India
- State: Bihar
- District: Munger

Population (2011)
  - Total: 16,614

Languages
  - Spoken: Angika, Hindi
- Time zone: UTC+5:30 (IST)

Bariarpur is a small town in the Munger district of Bihar state. Bariar (बरियार) means strong, hence Bariarpur means 'a place of the strong'.

== Demographics ==
The 2011 Census of India registered the population of Bariarpur as 16614, of which 8977 were male and 7637 female. The average literacy rate was 77.5%.

== Transport ==
The northern end of National Highway 333 starts from here. The NH333 branches off from National Highway 33 which serves a major part of Bihar running from Arwal to Farakka. Bariarpur railway station is situated on Sahibganj Loop line under the Malda railway division.
