= Munger district =

District in Bihar, India

- District of Bihar
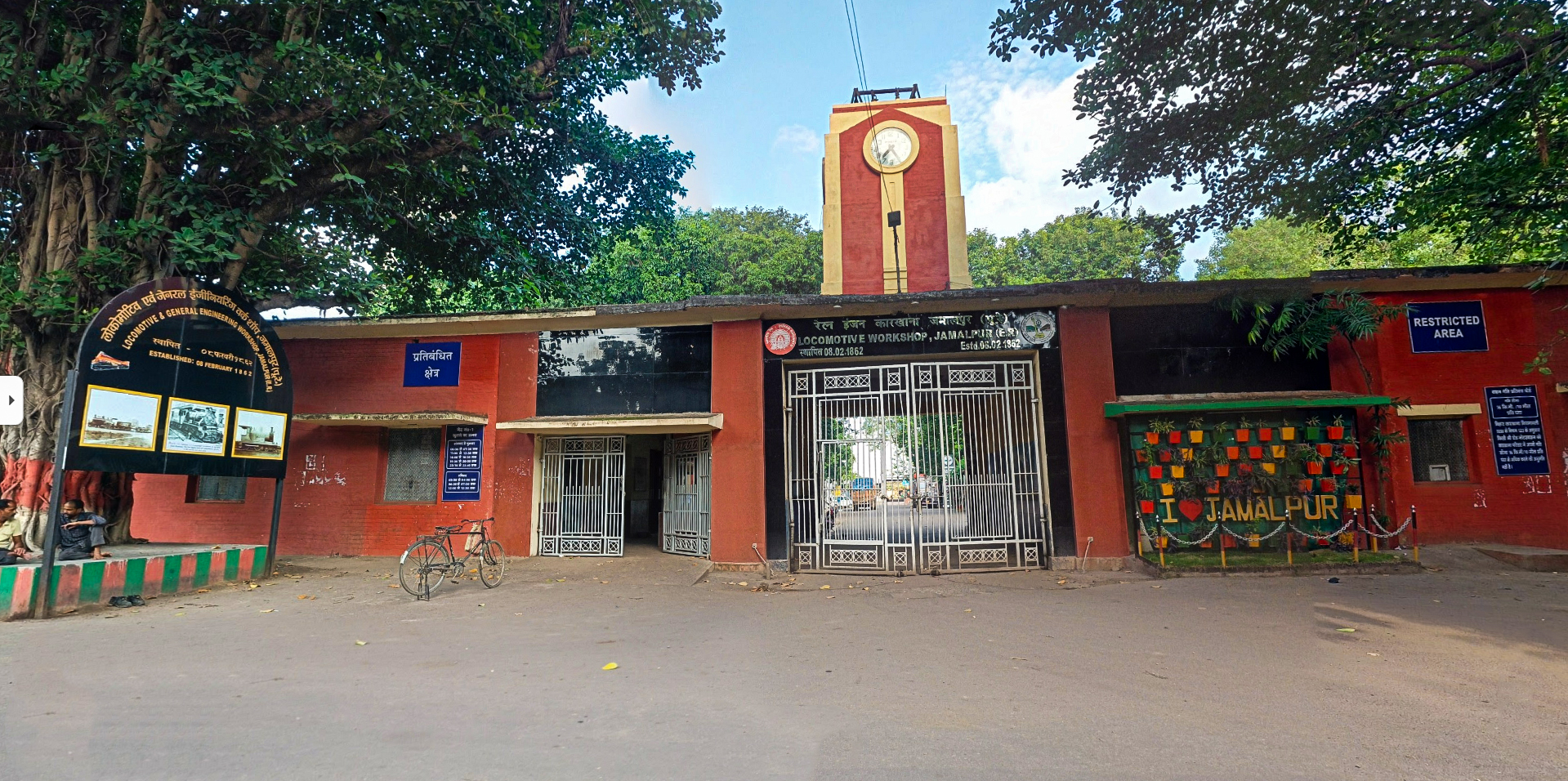
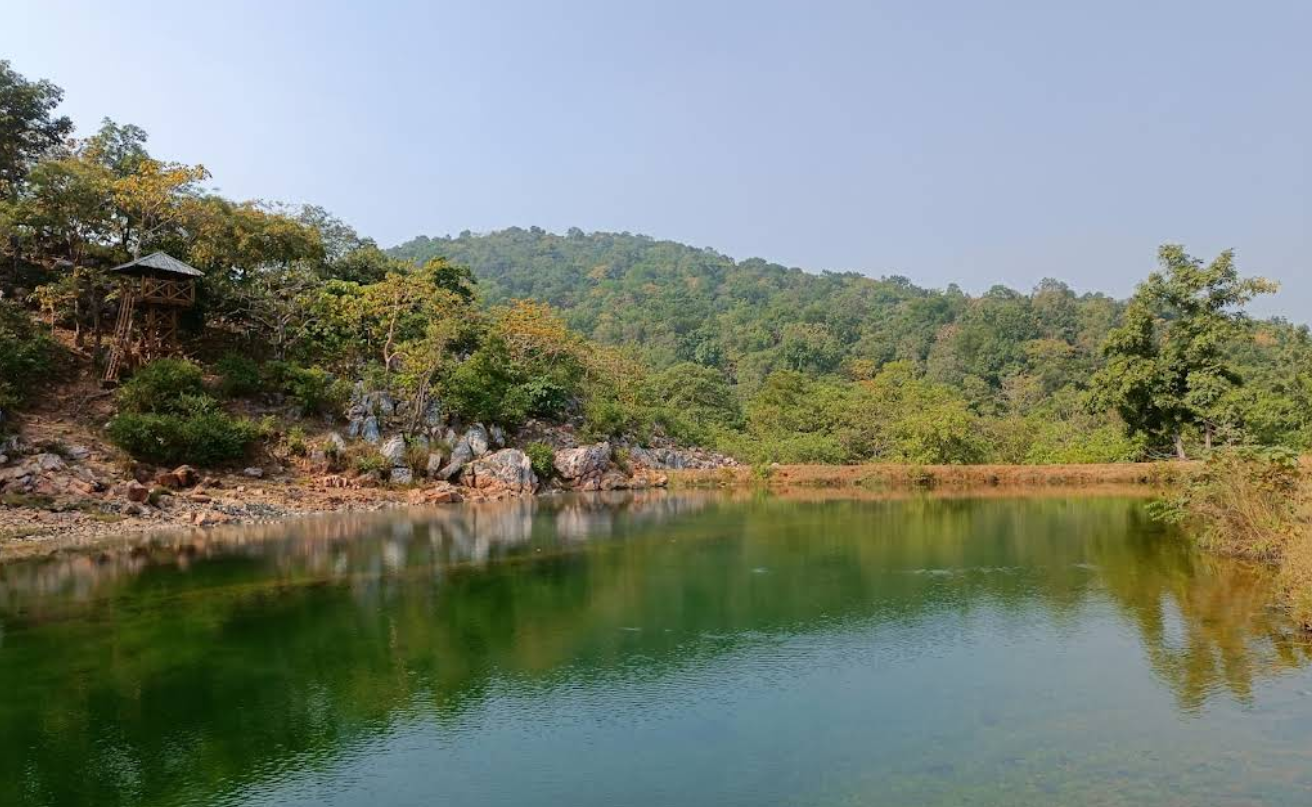
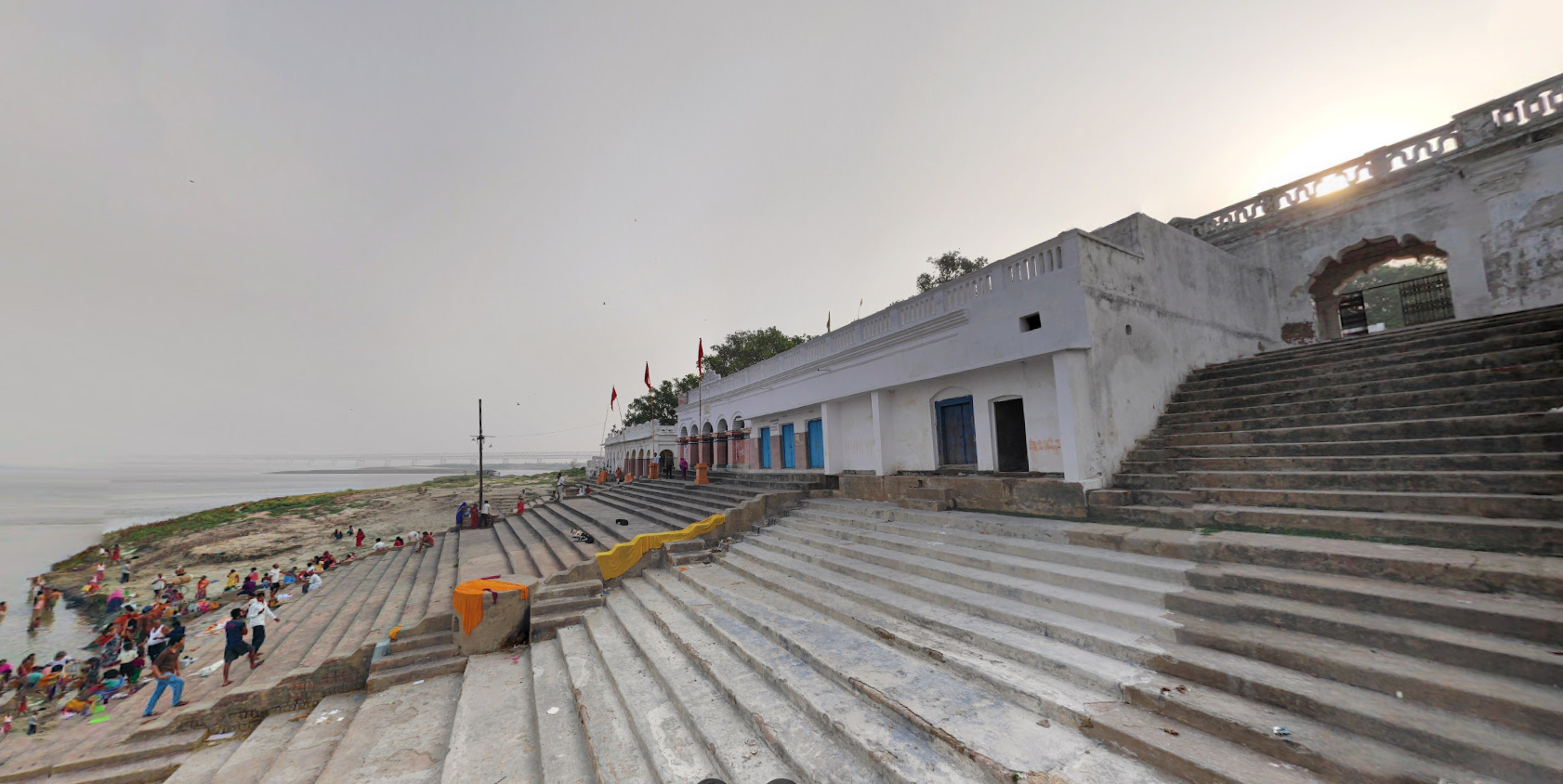
- Jamalpur Locomotive Workshop Bhim Bandh Lake Kashtharni Ghat Munger

- Location of Munger district in Bihar
- Country: India
- State: Bihar
- Division: Munger
- Established: 3 December 1834
- Headquarters: Munger

Government
  - Lok Sabha constituencies: Munger
  - Vidhan Sabha constituencies: Tarapur, Jamalpur and Munger

Area
  - Total: 1,419.7 km^{2} (548.1 sq mi)

Population (2011)
  - Total: 1,367,765
  - Density: 963.42/km^{2} (2,495.2/sq mi)

Demographics
  - Literacy: 73.30 per cent
  - Sex ratio: 879
- Time zone: UTC+5:30 (IST)
- PIN: 811201 to 811214, 813201
- Telephone code: +91-6344; +91-6342
- Vehicle registration: BR-08
- Major highways: NH-33, NH-333, NH-333B
- Average annual precipitation: 1146 mm
- Website: munger.nic.in

Munger district is one of the thirty-eight districts of Bihar state in eastern India. The city of Munger is the administrative headquarters of this district. The district is a part of Munger Division. Its literacy rate of 73.3% is higher than the state literacy rate of 63.8%, but lower than national rate of 74.04%.

The present collector and District Magistrate of Munger is Arvind Kumar Verma (IAS). Rajeev Rajan Singh Urf Lalan Singh is the district's MP.

== History ==
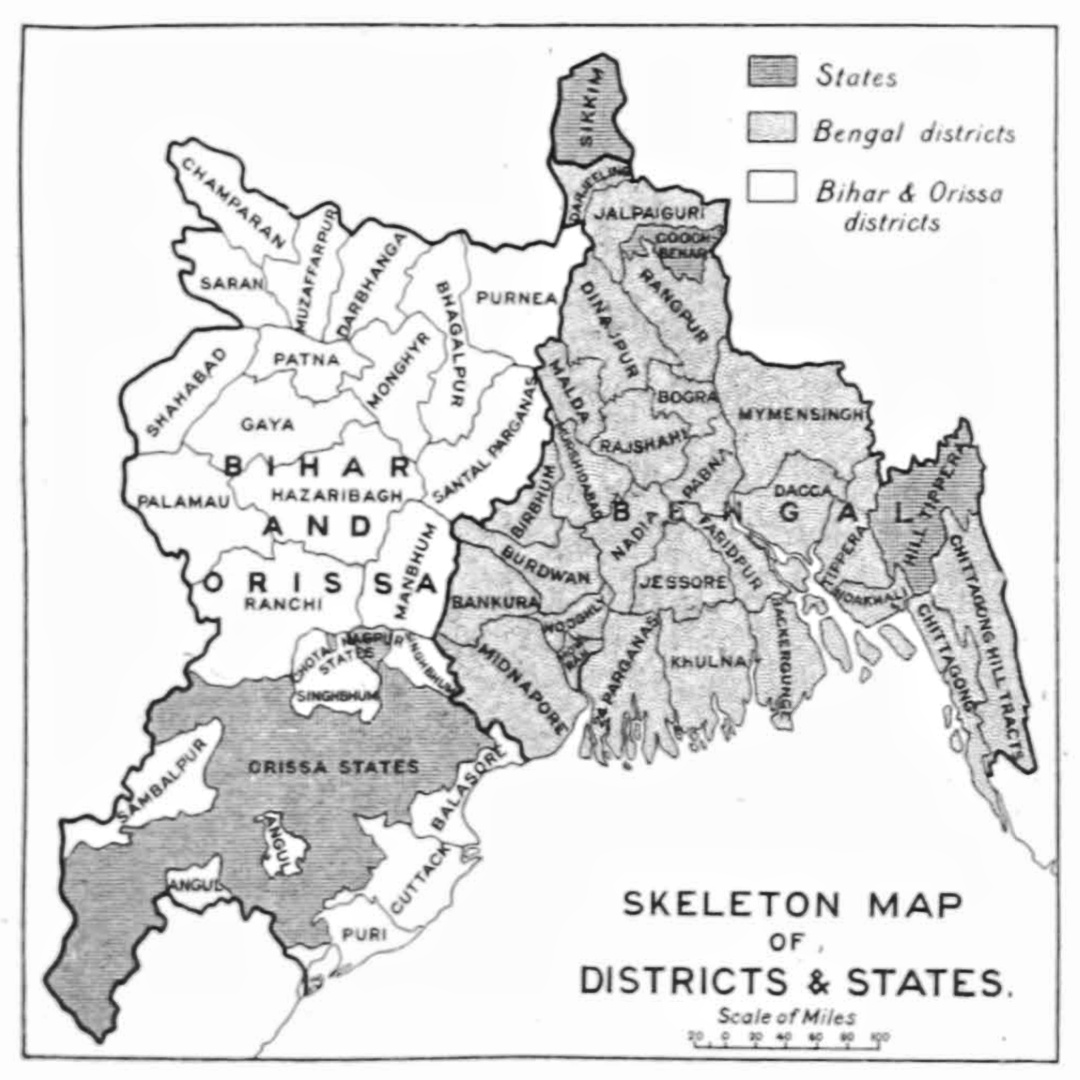
Munger district in British India

Munger has seen five districts partitioned off from its territory: Begusarai in 1972; Khagaria in 1988; and Jamui in 1991; and Lakhisarai district and Sheikhpura in 1994.

== Economy ==
Munger, along with Jamalpur are the major industrial cities in Bihar. Munger is also one of the most prosperous cities in Bihar with a per capita income of INR 42,793 in FY 2020-21.

== Geography ==
Munger District is located in the southern part of Bihar and its headquarters is located on the southern bank of river Ganges. Munger district occupies an area of 1,419 square kilometres (548 sq mi).

=== Flora and fauna ===
In 1976, Munger district became home to the Bhimbandh Wildlife Sanctuary, which has an area of 682 km^{2} (263.3 mi^{2}).

== Demographics ==
Historical population
Year	Pop.	±%
1901	339,678	—
1911	350,312	+3.1%
1921	333,110	−4.9%
1931	375,095	+12.6%
1941	424,049	+13.1%
1951	468,646	+10.5%
1961	555,833	+18.6%
1971	657,390	+18.3%
1981	801,071	+21.9%
1991	943,583	+17.8%
2001	1,137,797	+20.6%
2011	1,367,765	+20.2%
Source: Census of India

Religions in Munger district (2011)
Religion	Percent
Hinduism	91.56%
Islam	8.07%
Other or not stated	0.37%

According to the 2011 census Munger district has a population of 1,367,765, roughly equal to the nation of Eswatini or the US state of Hawaii. This gives it a ranking of 358th in India (out of a total of 640). The district has a population density of 958 inhabitants per square kilometre (2,480/sq mi) . Its population growth rate over the decade 2001-2011 was 19.45%. Munger has a sex ratio of 879 females for every 1000 males, and a literacy rate of 73.3%. 27.79% of the population lives in urban areas. Scheduled Castes and Scheduled Tribes make up 13.44% and 1.56% of the population respectively.

=== Languages ===
Languages of Munger district (2011)
1. Hindi (61.8%)
2. 'Other' Hindi (30.6%)
3. Urdu (6.10%)
4. Santali (0.93%)
5. Others (0.65%)

Official languages are Hindi and Urdu. At the time of the 2011 Census of India, 61.76% of the population in the district spoke Hindi, 6.10% Urdu and 0.93% Santali as their first language. 30.56% of the population spoke languages classified as 'Others' under Hindi in the census. The local language is Angika.

== Politics ==
District	No.	Constituency	Name	Party	Alliance	Remarks
Munger	164	Tarapur	Samrat Choudhary	BJP	NDA	Chief Minister
Munger	165	Munger	Kumar Pranay	BJP	NDA	
Munger	166	Jamalpur	Nachiketa Mandal	JD(U)	NDA	

== Administrative setup ==
The Munger district has 3 sub-divisions and 9 blocks and anchal (posts).

Sub-divisions	Blocks and anchal
Munger Sadar	Sadar, Jamalpur, Bariarpur, Dharhara
Haveli Kharagpur	Haveli Kharagpur, Tetiyabambar
Tarapur	Tarapur, Sangrampur, Asarganj

== Economy ==
In 2006, the Ministry of Panchayati Raj named Munger one of the country's 250 most backward districts (out of a total of 640). It is one of the 38 districts in Bihar have been receiving funds from the Backward Regions Grant Fund Programme (BRGF).

== Tourism ==
Munger has many historically popular destinations that are visited by tourists all year round.

=== Chandika Temple ===
The Chandika Sthan temple where Sati is worshiped. The legend says that the left eye of Maa Sati fell at Munger, which subsequently developed into a place of worship of the Divine Mother Chandi.

=== Bihar School of Yoga ===
Bihar School of Yoga also known as Bihar Yoga Bharati was established in 1963. It is dedicated to the study of yoga in an ashram environment, providing a spiritual oasis in the material and technological desert of the 21st century. Bihar Yoga Bharati (BYB), an Institute for Advanced Studies in Yogic Sciences, is the first of its kind in the world wholly devoted to the subject of yoga.

=== Munger Fort ===
Munger Fort is an almost two thousand-year-old fort tracing back to Chandragupta Maurya period. During the British Raj] it was occupied by the British. The story of Monghyr Mutiny is well known among the locals.

=== Pir Shah Nafah Shrine ===
The tomb of Pir Shah Nafah Shrine is a sacred Muhammdan shrine built on an elevated piece of ground near the southern gate of the Munger Fort. It is said that it was a mazaar of a Pir or Saint whose name is still unknown. He is said to have travelled from Persia to Ajmer and from there came down to Munger under the instructions from Khwaza Moin-Uddin Chisti.

=== Kastaharani Ghaat ===
Kastaharani Ghaat traces its origin back to Ramayana. It is believed that on his return journey from Mithila to Ayodhya after marrying Sita, Rama and company took a dip in this water to relieve themselves from fatigue (kasta) and hence the name Kastaharani (reliever of stress).

== Gallery ==
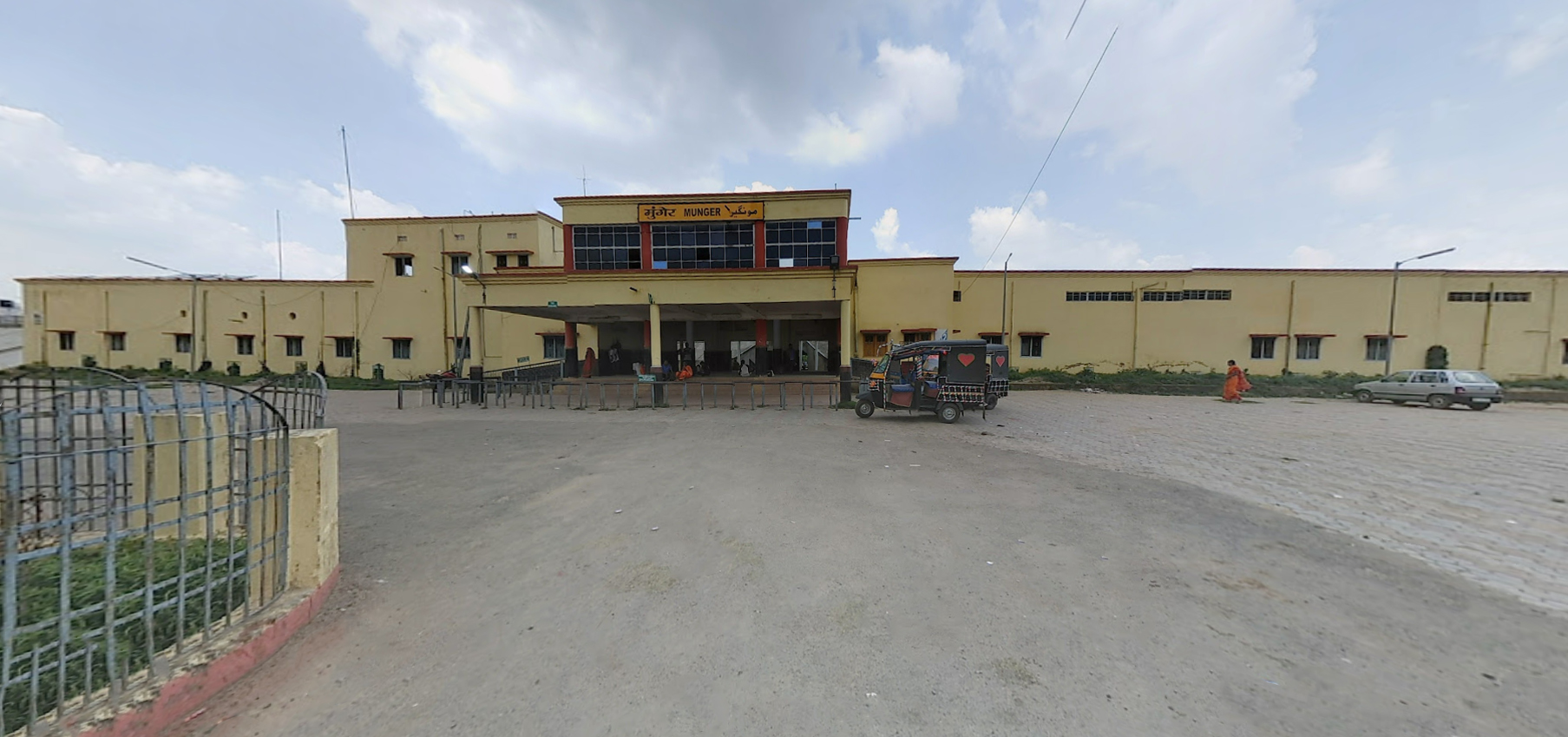
Munger Railway station

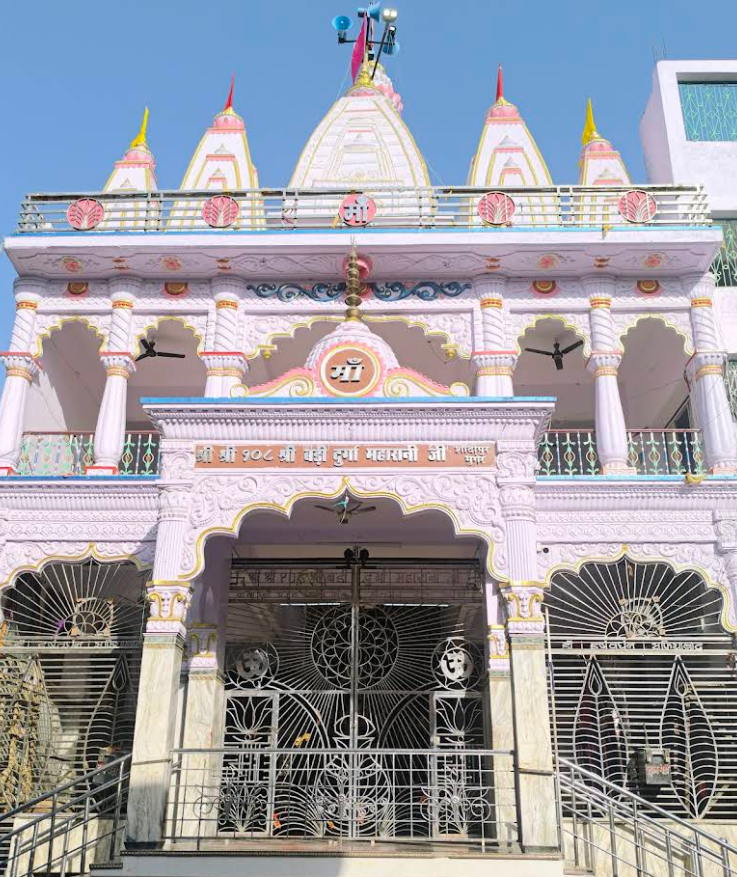
Badi Durga Mandir Munger

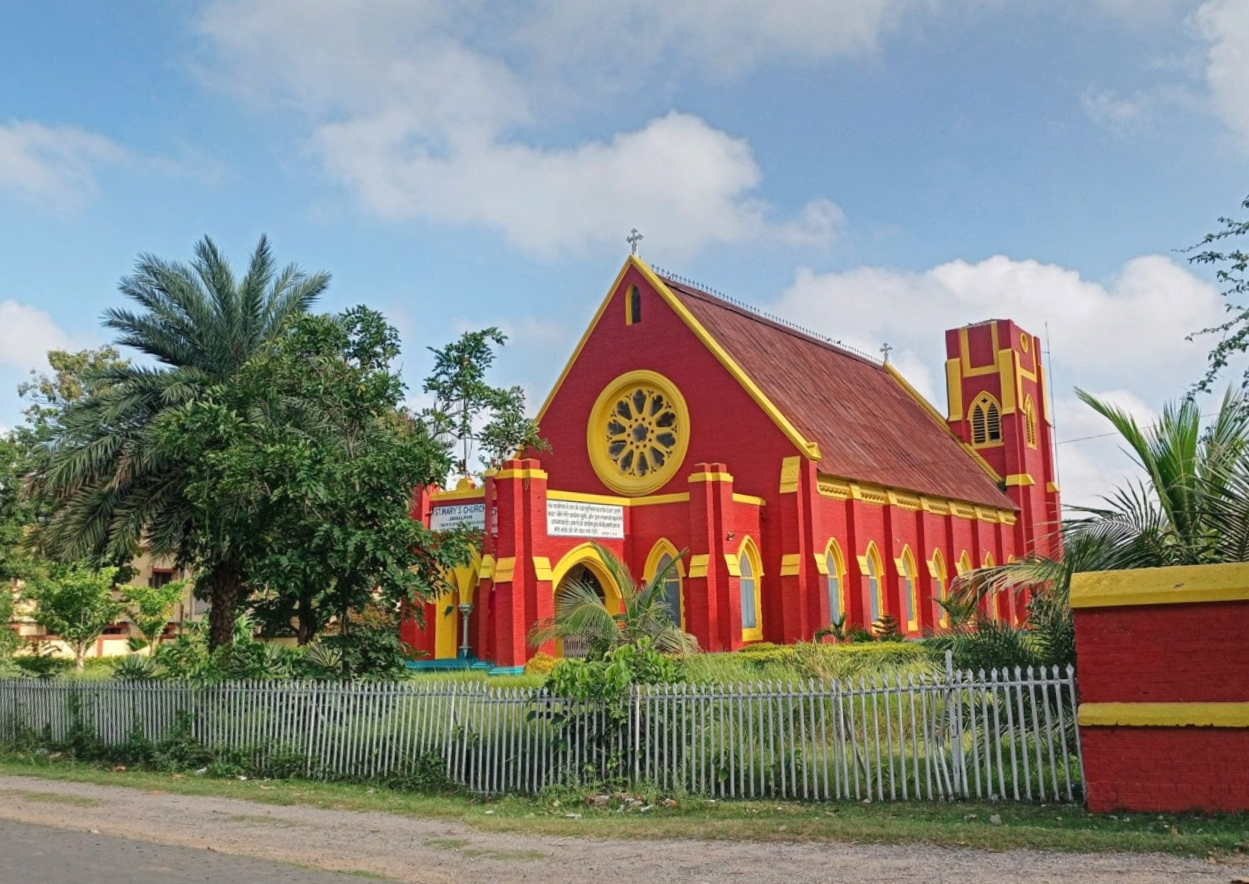
St. Mary's Church at Jamalpur

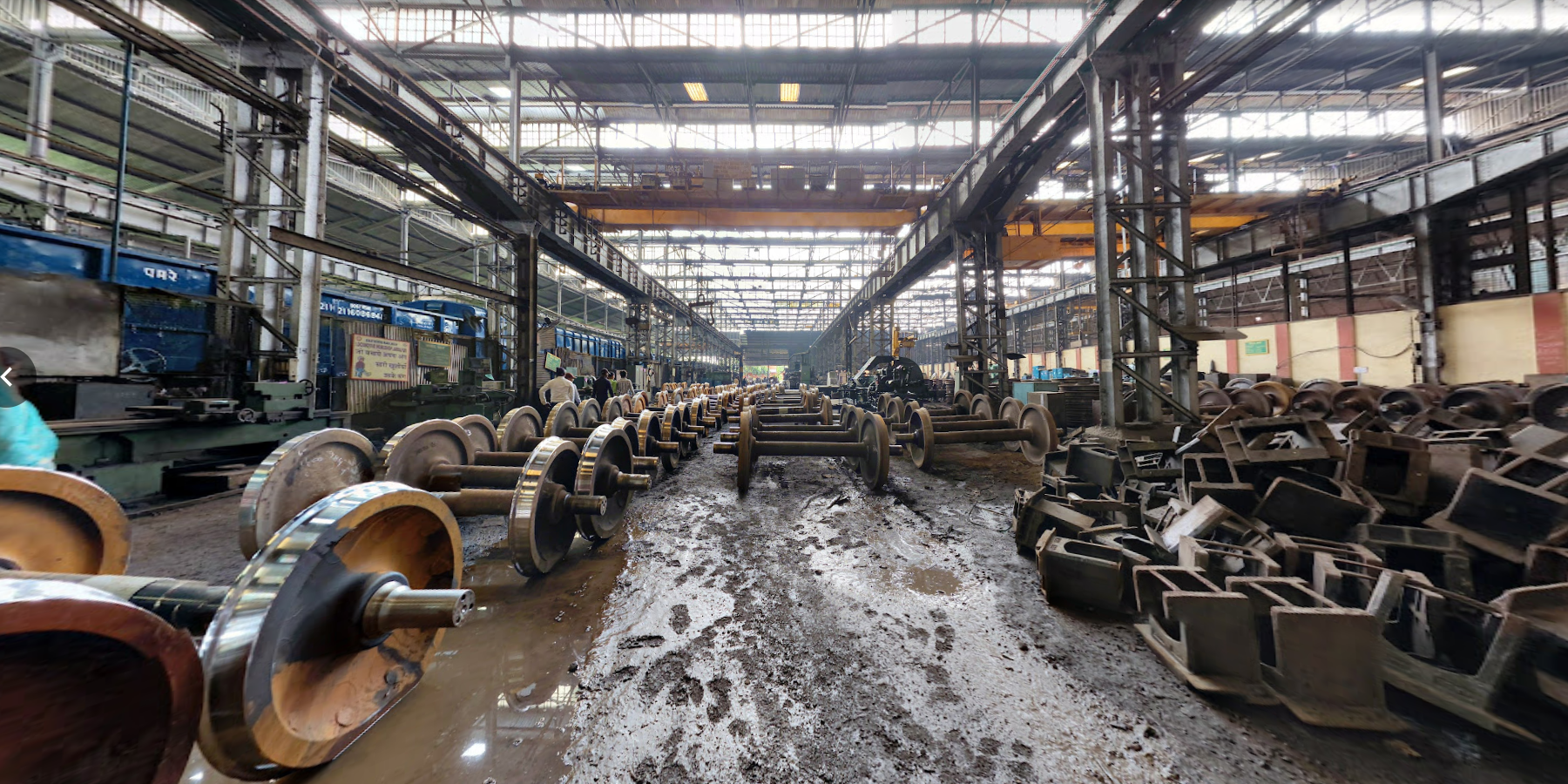
Construction of wheels at Jamalpur Locomotive Workshop

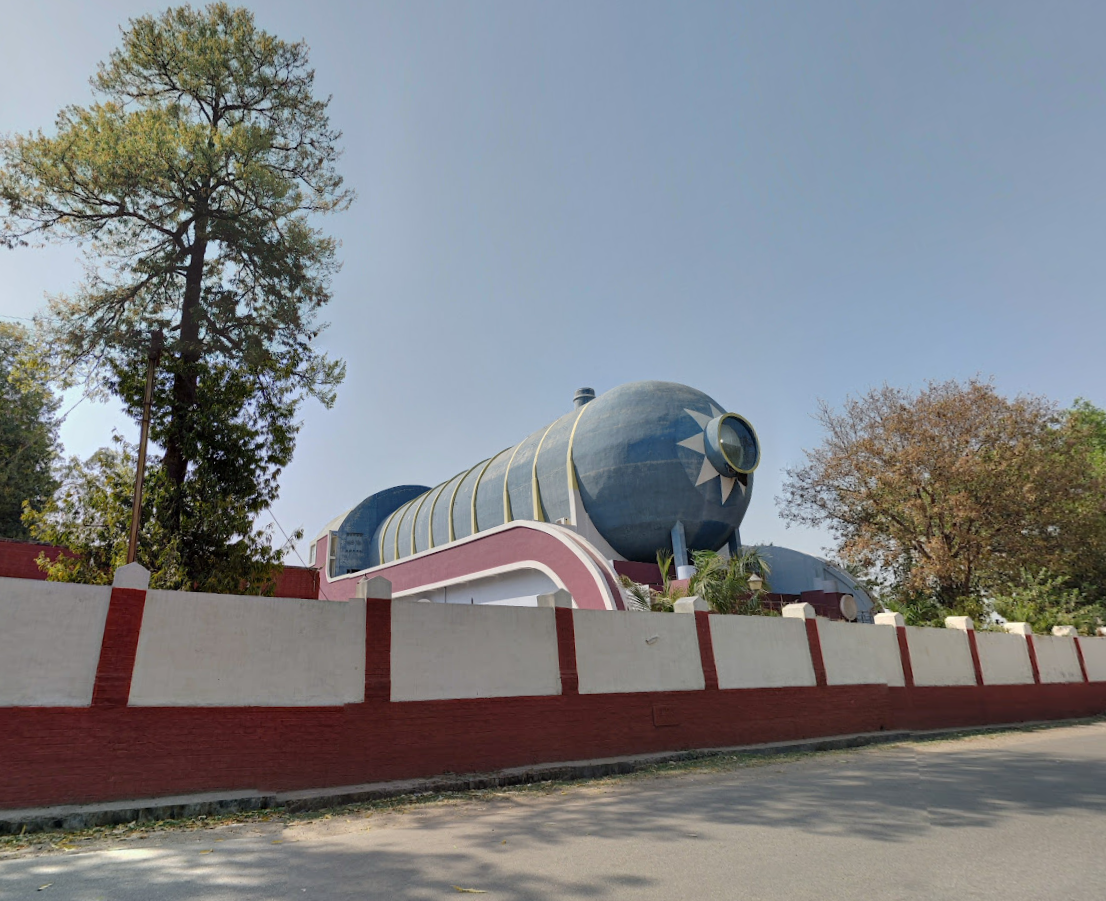
IRIMEE Jamalpur

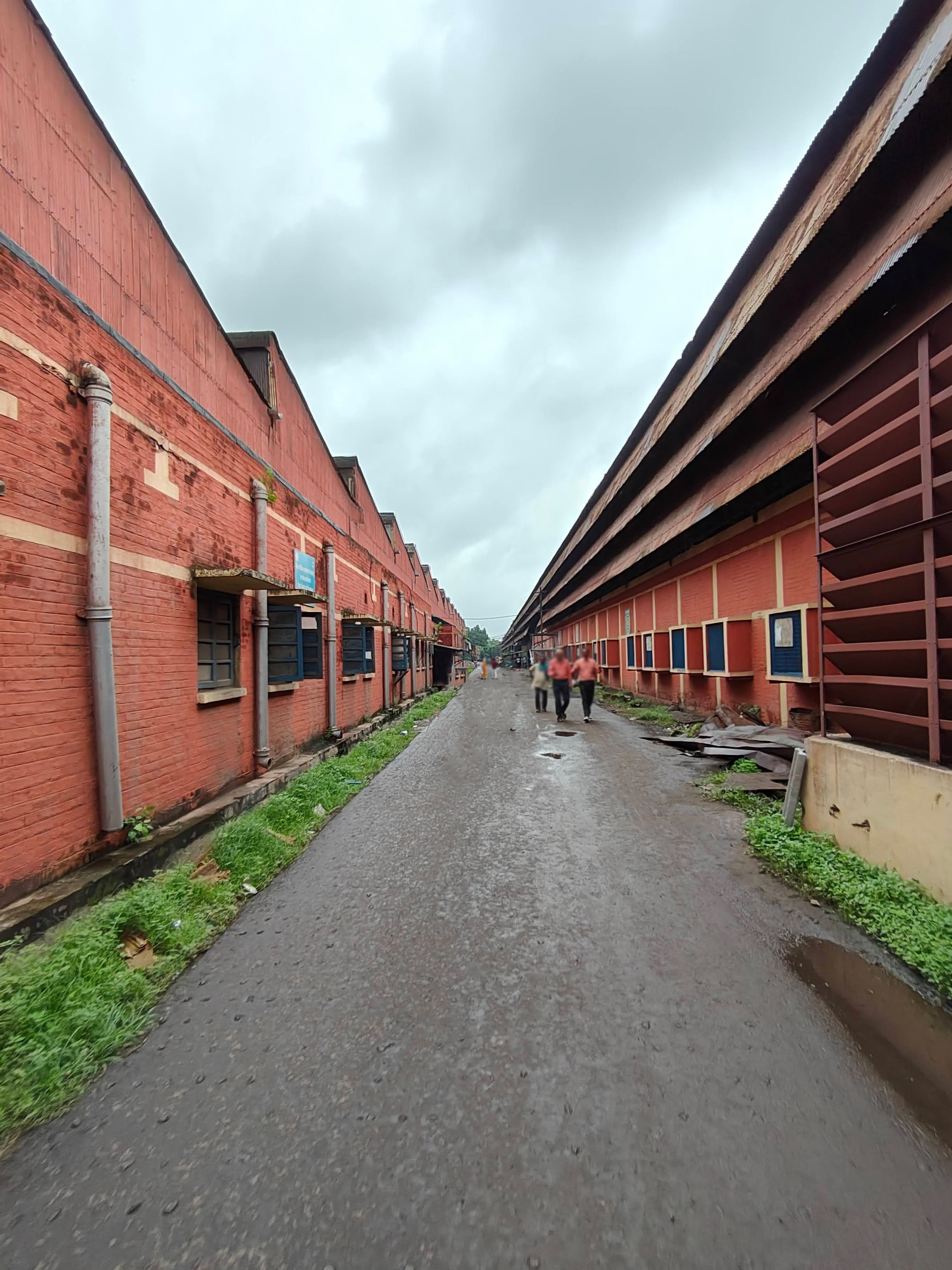
Corridor of Jamalpur Locomotive Workshop
