= Dhanraj Singh (politician) =

Indian politician

Member of Parliament, Lok Sabha
- In office 1989–1991
- Preceded by: Deonandan Prasad Yadava
- Succeeded by: Brahmanand Mandal
- Constituency: Munger, Bihar

Personal details
- Born: 1 January 1944 Barhat, Munger District, Bihar, British India
- Party: Janata Dal
- Other political affiliations: Indian National Congress

Dhanraj Singh was an Indian politician. He was elected to the Lok Sabha, the lower house of the Parliament of India from Munger in Bihar as a member of the Janata Dal.
