= Munger =

- City
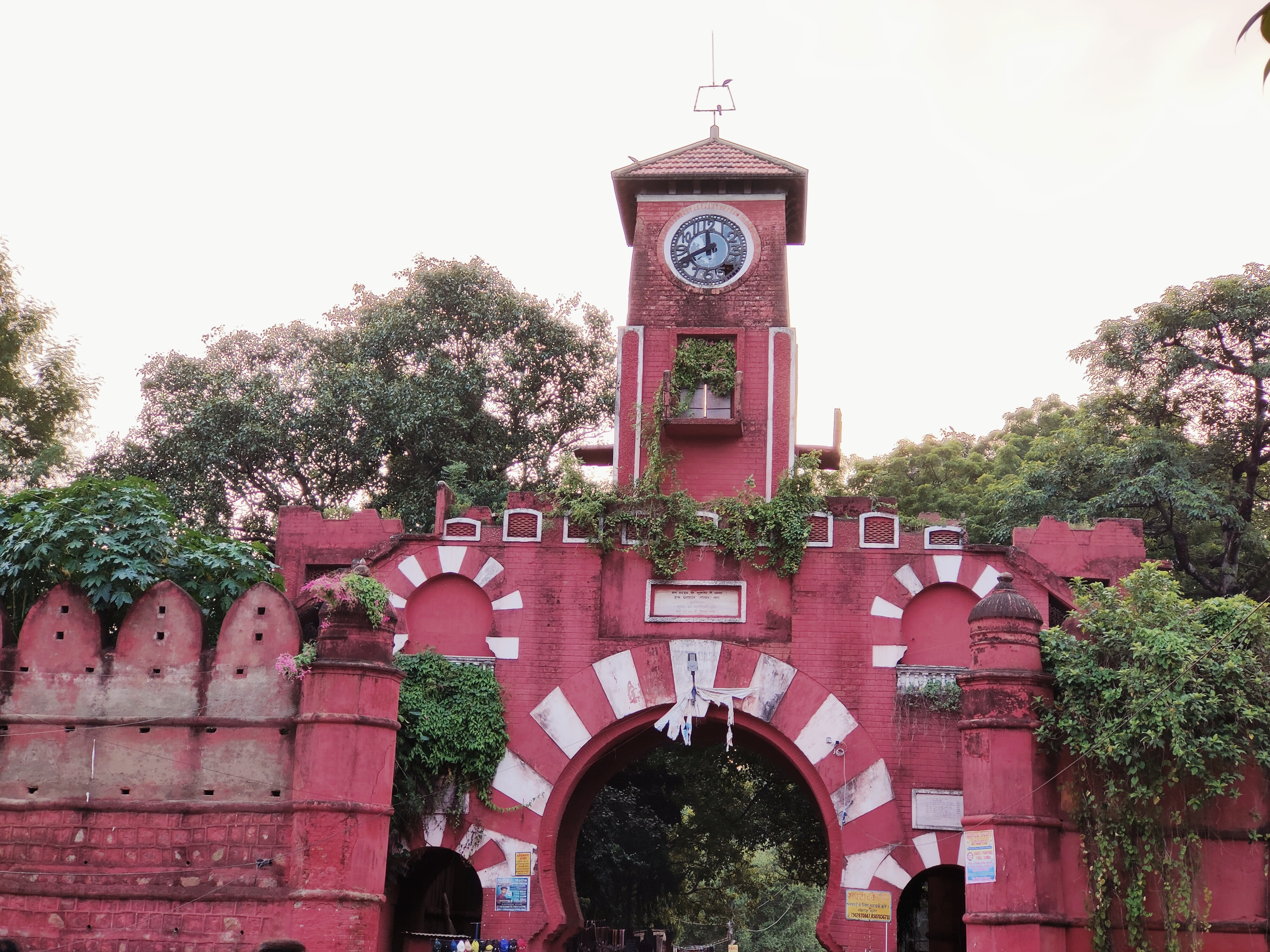
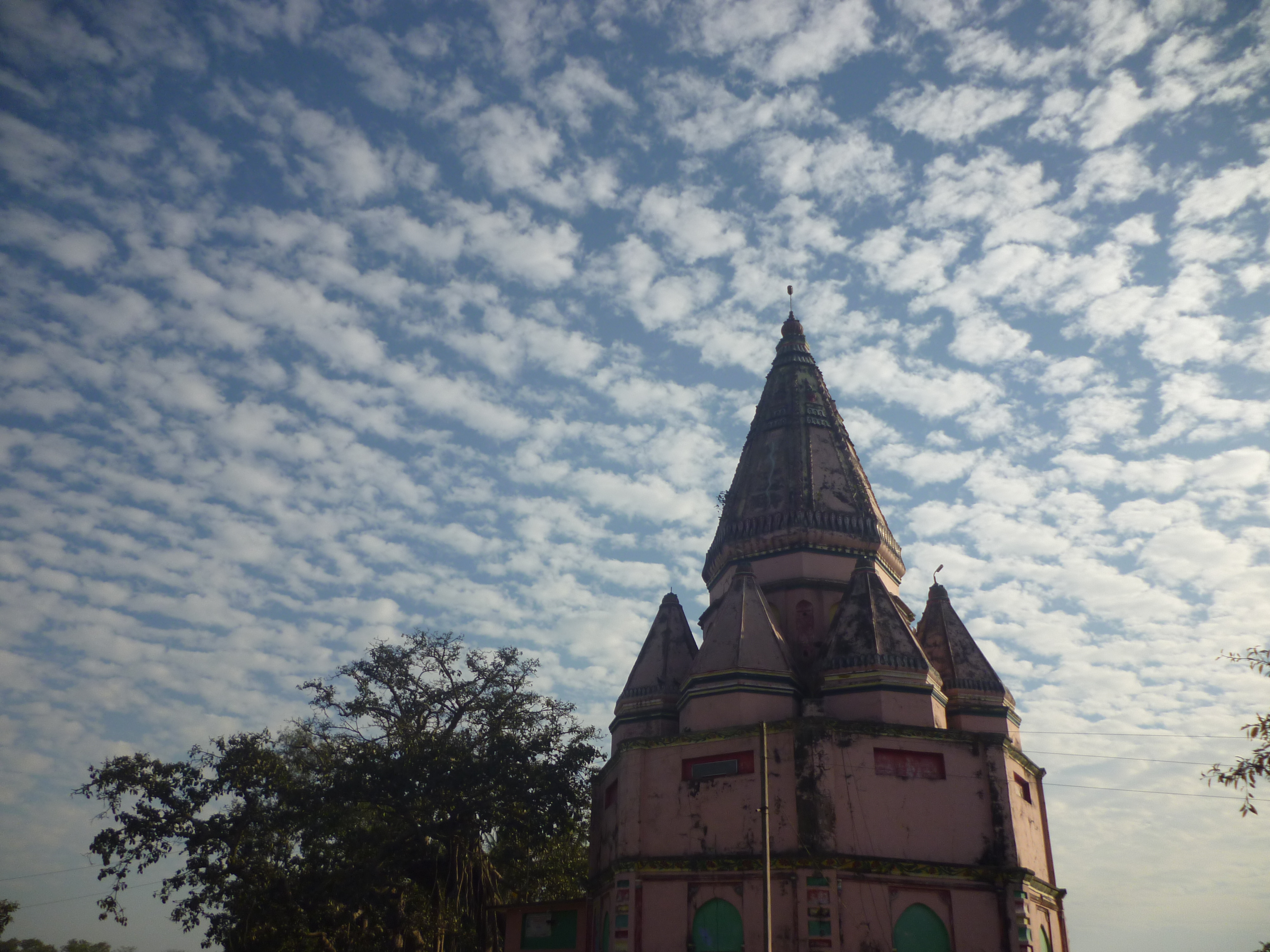
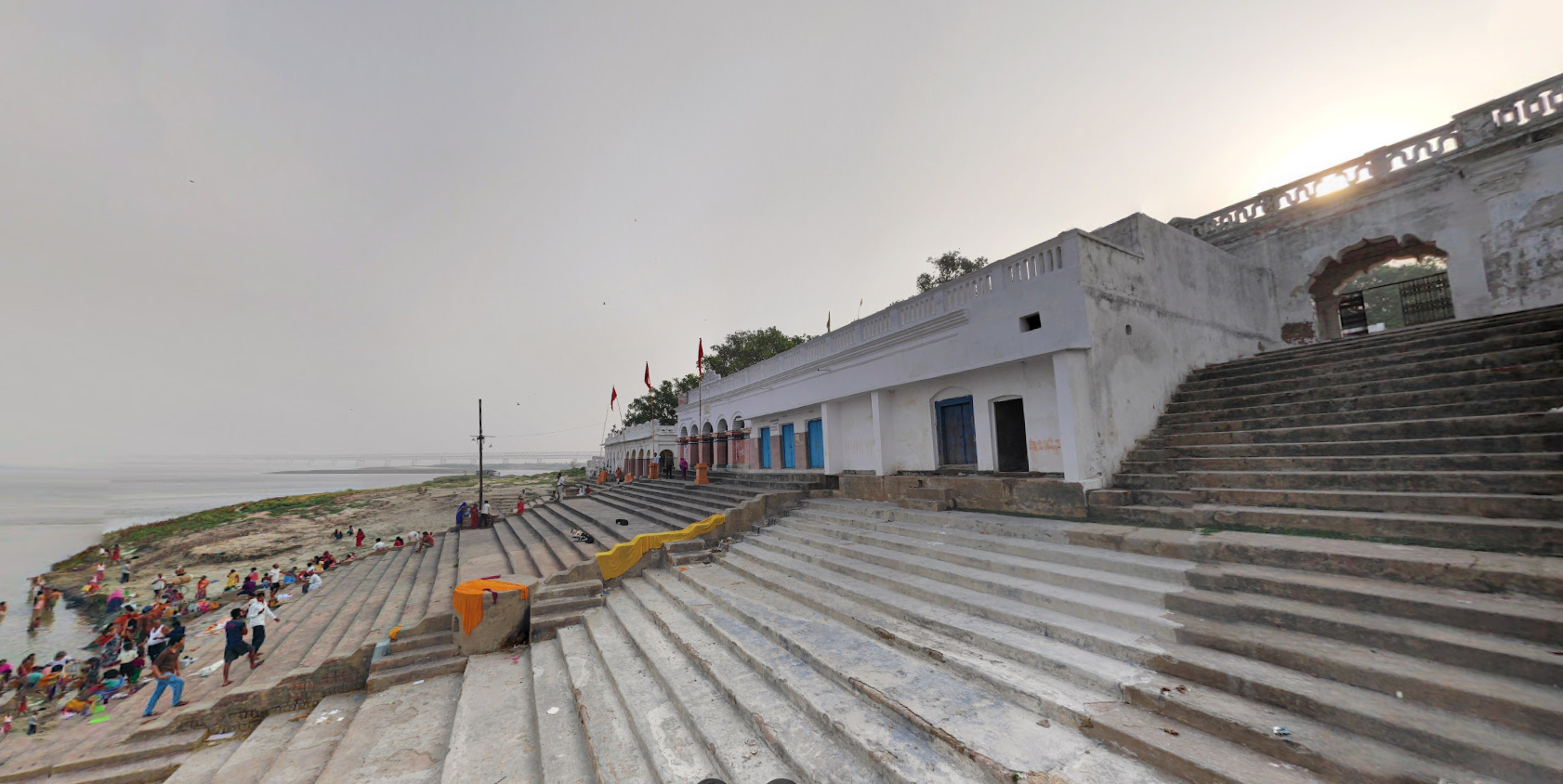
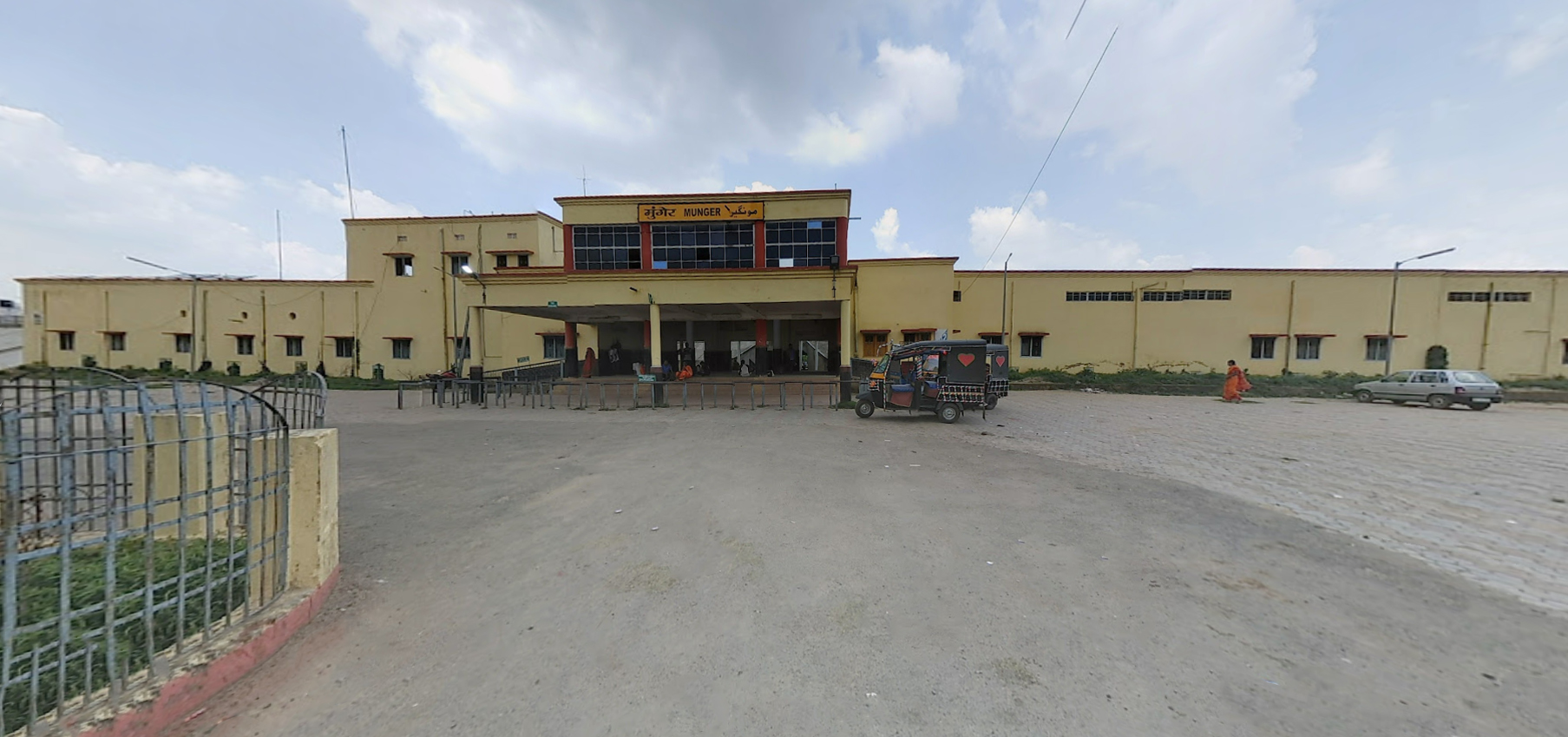
- Munger Fort Chandika Sthan Kastaharni Ghat Munger railway station
- Nickname: Yoga Nagri
- Location in Bihar, India Munger (India)
- Coordinates: 25.381°N 86.465°E
- Country: India
- State: Bihar
- District: Munger
- Established: 1834
- Founder: Chandragupta II

Government
  - Type: Municipal Corporation
  - Body: Munger Nagar Nigam
  - Mayor: Kumkum Devi
  - Municipal Commissioner: Sivakshi Dixit (IAS)
  - MLA, Munger: Pranav Kumar (BJP)

Area
  - Total: 89 km^{2} (34 sq mi)
- Elevation: 43 m (141 ft)

Population (2011)
  - Total: 213,101
  - Rank: 11th in Bihar
  - Density: 2,400/km^{2} (6,200/sq mi)
- Demonym: Mungeri

Language
  - Official: Hindi
  - Additional official: Urdu
  - Regional: Hindi, English, Maithili (Angika)
- Time zone: UTC+5:30 (IST)
- PIN: 811201 to 811214, 813201
- Telephone code: +91-6344
- Vehicle registration: BR-08
- Website: munger.nic.in

Munger, formerly spelt as Monghyr, is a twin city and a Municipal Corporation situated in the Indian state of Bihar. It is the administrative headquarters of Munger district and Munger Division. Munger was one of the major cities in Eastern India and undivided Bengal during Mughal period and British Raj. It is one of the major political, cultural, educational and commercial centers of Bihar and Eastern India. Munger is situated about 180 km (110 mi) east of capital city Patna, about 480 km (300 mi) west of Eastern India's largest city Kolkata and 1,200 km (750 mi) from country's capital New Delhi.

Historically, Munger is known for being an ancient seat of rule. The twin city comprises Munger and Jamalpur situated on the southern bank of the river Ganges. It is situated 8 km (5.0 mi) from Jamalpur Junction, 180 km (110 mi) east of capital city Patna and 430 km (270 mi) from Kolkata the capital of West Bengal.

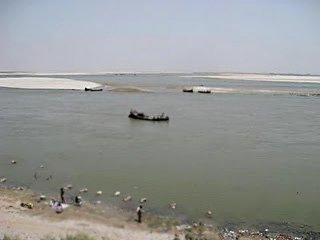
Kastaharni Ghat

Munger is said to have been founded by the Guptas (4th century CE) and contains a fort that houses the tomb of the Muslim saint Shah Mushk Nafā (died 1497). In 1763, the Nawab of Bengal Mir Qasim made Munger his capital and built an arsenal and several palaces. It was constituted a municipality in 1864.

== History ==
In classical period (4th-5th century), Munger was known as "Guptagadh" or "Guptagarh". The inscription was found inscribed on a rock at the kasta-harani ghat at the north-western side of the present fort. Guptagadh was founded by Chandragupta Vikramaditya. In early medieval times, Munger was known as Mudgagiri (Sanskrit Mudgagiri, with no diacritics). The name is derived from Sanskrit mudga, referring to the mung bean, plus giri, meaning hill. Mudgagiri was a royal residence of the Pala Empire. Sometime in the mid-800s, there was a significant battle fought at Mudgagiri between the Palas (possibly under Narayanapala) and the Pratiharas, possibly under Mihira Bhoja. Another Pratihara dynast, a feudatory ruler named Kakka, also took part in the battle, which was part of a Pratihara invasion of Bengal. Later, Munger was mentioned (as Mudgiri) as the residence of the Pala ruler Ramapala. In the 1100s, Mudgagiri seems to have been under Sena rule. A copper plate grant of the Gahadavala ruler Govindachandra indicates that he advanced as far as Mudgagiri in April 1146, and bathed in the Ganges here on the day of Akshaya Tritiya. According to R. D. Banerji, Govindachandra was likely leading a military expedition to Bengal at that point, and the expedition was evidently unsuccessful, leaving eastern Magadha under Sena control.

Historically, Munger was located at a strategic bottleneck controlling the main route into Bengal from the west. To the south, travel was impeded by the steep hills; to the north, the numerous Ganges tributaries were the main obstacle.

At the end of 12th century, Munger, along with Patna, was conquered by Bakhtiyar Khalji. The region served as a province of Bengal until 1330 before its annexation by Muhammad Tughlaq. From 1397 Munger was part of the Jaunpur Sultanate till Sikander Lodi overrun Bihar before 1499. Treaty was concluded between Delhi and Bengal, which allowed Alauddin Hussain Shah to retain the region of Bihar. In 1521, Nusrat Shah annexed few forts of Munger. Later it was captured by Sher Shah Suri. From 1545 till Akbar's invasion of Bengal, Munger remained in the hands of Karrani dynasty. The region remained under Muslim rule until British occupation of Bihar in 1760's.

Maharshi Nagendranath Bhaduri pursued intense spiritual practices in solitude, especially Hathayoga and Pranayam, in a lonely cave in Monghyr and attained salvation there. He also known as Bhaduri Mahasaya, was an Indian yogi famously referred to as "The Levitating Saint" by Paramahansa Yogananda in his book Autobiography of a Yogi.The chapter which describes Bhaduri Mahasaya is titled "The Levitating Saint".

== Geography ==
=== Climate ===
The climate of Munger is subtropical (warm in summer and cold during winter). The Köppen climate classification sub-type for this climate is humid subtropical.

Climate data for Munger, India
Month	Jan	Feb	Mar	Apr	May	Jun	Jul	Aug	Sep	Oct	Nov	Dec	Year
Mean daily maximum °C (°F)	23.5 (74.3)	26.4 (79.6)	32.5 (90.5)	37.0 (98.6)	37.9 (100.3)	35.5 (95.9)	31.9 (89.4)	31.2 (88.1)	31.5 (88.7)	30.8 (87.5)	27.7 (81.9)	24.2 (75.6)	30.8 (87.5)
Mean daily minimum °C (°F)	9.4 (48.9)	11.9 (53.4)	16.9 (62.4)	21.8 (71.3)	24.6 (76.3)	25.4 (77.7)	24.9 (76.8)	24.8 (76.6)	24.2 (75.5)	20.9 (69.7)	14.4 (57.9)	10 (50)	19.1 (66.4)
Average precipitation mm (inches)	15 (0.6)	18 (0.7)	13 (0.5)	13 (0.5)	41 (1.6)	170 (6.8)	300 (11.7)	280 (11)	230 (8.9)	81 (3.2)	5.1 (0.2)	2.5 (0.1)	1,160 (45.7)
Source: weatherbase

== Demographics ==
As per 2011 census, Munger Municipal Corporation has a total population of 213,101 out of which 113,173 were males and 99,928 were females. It had a sex ratio of 883. The population between 0 and 6 years was 29,260. The literacy rate of the 7+ population was 81.83 per cent.

Religion in Munger
Religion
Hinduism	81.01%
Islam	18.02%
Christians	0.20%
Sikhism	0.04%
Others	0.34%
Distribution of religions

== Economy ==
Munger, along with Jamalpur are the major industrial cities in Bihar. Munger is also one of the most prosperous cities in Bihar with a per capita income of INR 42,793 in FY 2020–21.

Indian Railways operates of Asia's largest and oldest railway workshops at Jamalpur. This was set up by the British Raj in 1862.

Munger has also ITC Factory established by the British. Ordinance Gun Factory Munger, ITC Milk Dairy and many others.

== Culture ==
Munger is known for Sita Manpatthar (Sita charan) Sitacharan temple situated on a boulder in the middle of the Ganges in Munger (Anga Region) is the main center of public faith regarding Chhath festival. It is believed that Mata Sita performed the Chhath festival in Munger. It was only after this that Chhath Mahaparv started. That is why Chhath Mahaparva is celebrated with great pomp in Munger. Munger is also famous for Durga Puja Mahotsav which is celebrated for 10 days. The first nine days are celebrated with great fervor across the city. On the 10th day evening, one side rushes to the Polo Grounds for Ravan Badh, while the other side prepares for a unique ritual known as "Shobha Yatra." The “Shobha Yatra of Badi Durga of Shadipur” marks the importance of Badi Durga of Munger all over the country. People from all over the city join this yatra, and the deity is immersed early in the morning in the holy river Ganges.

== Places of interest ==
- Munger Fort, covers an area of around 222 acres (90 ha)
- Munger Museum
- Chandika Asthan, a sacred Shakti-Peeth
- Kastaharni Ghat on the Ganges
- Bhimbandh Wildlife Sanctuary
- Bihar School of Yoga
- Sita Kund hotspring
- Rishi Kund hotspring
- Pir Pahar
- Jai Prakash Udyaan / Company Garden
- Dolphin ECO Park for the conservation of Gangetic river dolphin.
- Mir Qasim's Tunnel
- Peer Shah Nafah Shrine
- Haveli Kharagpur Jheel (Lake)
- Raja Rani Park
- Goenka Shivalaya / Machli Talab

== Transport ==
=== Rail ===
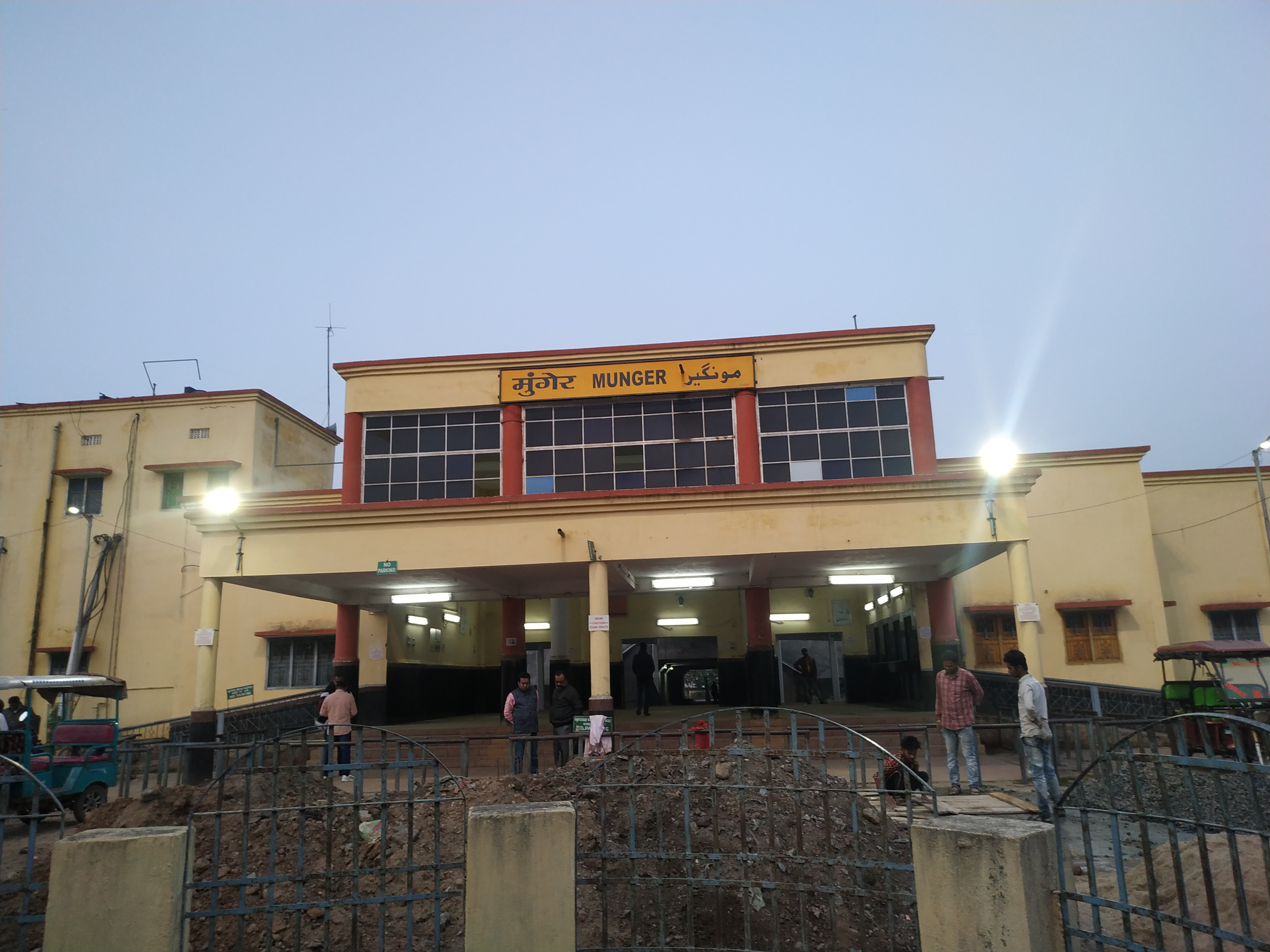
Munger Railway Station

Munger has two railway stations: Jamalpur Junction and Munger Railway Station. The former is the main railhead for the city while the latter, which was earlier called Purabsarai Railway Station, acts as suburban facility. Stations are connected with Sahibganj Loop.

The rail system provides connection to cities such as New Delhi, Mumbai,Surat, Yesvantpur Junction, Jamshedpur, Jammu Tawi, Dibrugarh, Guwahati, Lucknow, Patna, Ranchi, Agartala, Hyderabad, Deoghar Junction, Muzaffarpur Junction and Dhanbad. The Munger Ganga Bridge, which takes both rail and road-traffic, connects Munger to the nearby cities of Begusarai, Saharsa Junction, Katihar and Khagaria Junction as well as various districts of North Bihar. The bridge is the third-largest rail-cum-road bridge in India.

=== Road ===
Munger is connected to major parts of India by various National and State Highways. The major cities of Bihar and Jharkhand - such as Patna, Ranchi, Bhagalpur, Purnia, Katihar, Bihar sharif, Muzaffarpur, Jamshedpur, Dhanbad, Gaya, Bokaro and Darbhanga - can be reached by NH 33, NH 333B, NH 333A, NH 31 and NH 333 and various state Highways. Regular bus service are provided by BSRTC for all the major cities and other destinations. Citybuses, Taxies, Autorikshaw, E-Rickshaw, etc. are available all the times in the entire city for transportation. Munger Bhagalpur Ganga Path 4lane road is also under construction.

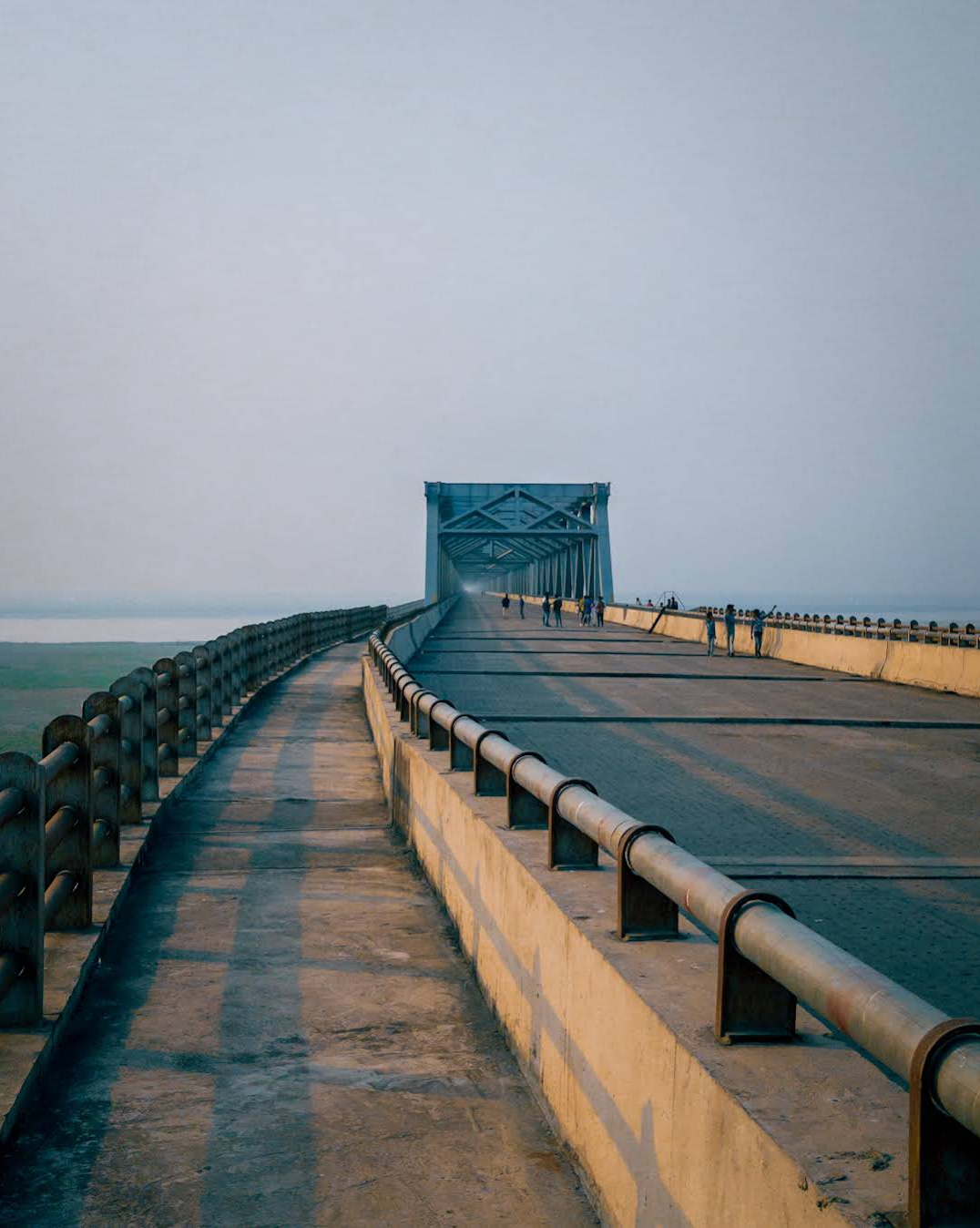

The Munger Ganga Bridge links Munger to various districts of North Bihar and north-eastern India by 2021.

=== Air ===
Munger Airport is located in Safyabad, which is 5 km from Munger. It was re-inaugurated by Chief Minister Nitish Kumar on 24 May 2016. Munger has no international airport with commercial service. Domestic airport with commercial service is Jay Prakash Narayan Airport in Patna around 180 km away, which is served by all major airlines.

The nearest international airport is Netaji Subhash Chandra Bose International Airport in Kolkata, which is around 480 km away.

== Education ==
- Bihar School of Yoga, established in 1964 by Satyananda Saraswati.
- Government Engineering College, Munger
- Indian Railway Institute of Mechanical and Electrical Engineering
- Munger Forestry College
- Munger University
- R.D. & D.J. College, established in 1898 and is one of the oldest institutions of higher education in Bihar; named after Raja Deoki Nandan

== Notable people ==
- Sharadindu Bandyopadhyay, Bengali writer, lawyer and script-writer in Hindi films.
- Nandalal Bose, sculptor and painter
- George Browne, 6th Marquess of Sligo (1856–1935), Anglo-Irish aristocrat, born in Munger
- Mona Das - Washington State Senate
- Brahmanand Mandal - Former MP from Munger Lok Sabha constituency
- Muhammad Ali Mungeri, Indian Muslim scholar, founder Nadwatul Ulama
- Minnatullah Rahmani First General Secretary of All India Muslim Personal Law Board
- Wali Rahmani - General Secretary of All India Muslim Personal Law Board of India
- Ramdhari Singh Dinkar, poet
- Monazir Hassan - four-time MLA from Munger and one-time member of the Indian Parliament in 15th Lok Sabha (2009 to 2014) and represented Begusarai (Lok Sabha constituency).
- Kumar Suresh Singh, Director-General of Anthropological Survey of India
- Raja Devaki Nandan Prasad Singh, philanthropist and benefactor to the Wheeler Senate House at Patna University; member of the Bihar and Orissa Legislative Council (1924–29)
- Shri Krishna Sinha, first Chief Minister of Bihar and a freedom fighter
- Udit Narayan Singh of Shakarpura Raj Zamindari- local benefactor
- Niranjanananda Saraswati, yoga Guru
- Satyananda Saraswati, founder of Bihar School of Yoga
- Ramdeo Singh Yadav - three times MLA and Co-operative Minister, Government of Bihar.
- Samrat Chaudhary 24th Chief Minister of Bihar. Choudhary is the first Bharatiya Janata Party (BJP) member to serve as Chief minister of Bihar.

== See also ==
- Anga region
- Angika
- Manjusha Art

== Bibliography ==
- O'malley, L. S. S. (2007). Bihar And Orissa District Gazetteers : Monghyr. Concept Publishing Company. ISBN 978-81-7268-135-7.
