= Munger Lok Sabha constituency =

Lok Sabha constituency in Bihar

Coordinates: 25.4°N 86.5°E

Munger
- Lok Sabha constituency

Constituency details
- Country: India
- Region: East India
- State: Bihar
- Assembly constituencies: Munger; Jamalpur; Suryagarha; Lakhisarai; Mokama; Barh
- Established: 1951

Member of Parliament
- 18th Lok Sabha
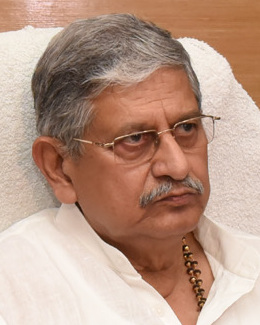
- Incumbent Lalan Singh; Union Minister of Panchayati Raj
- Party: JD(U)
- Alliance: NDA
- Elected year: 2024
- Preceded by: Veena Devi; LJP

Munger Lok Sabha constituency is one of the 40 Lok Sabha (parliamentary) constituencies in Bihar state in eastern India. Mokama and Barh are also part of Munger Lok Sabha constituency which fall under Patna district. It shares border with Patna Sahib Lok Sabha constituency.

== Assembly segments ==
Presently, Munger Lok Sabha constituency comprises the following six Vidhan Sabha (legislative assembly) segments:

#	Name	District	Member	Party	2024 lead
165	Munger	Munger	Pranav Kumar Yadav	BJP	JD(U)
166	Jamalpur	Munger	Nachiketa Mandal	JD(U)	JD(U)
167	Suryagarha	Lakhisarai	Ramanand Mandal	JD(U)	JD(U)
168	Lakhisarai	Lakhisarai	Vijay Kumar Sinha	BJP	JD(U)
178	Mokama	Patna	Anant Kumar Singh	IND	RJD
179	Barh	Patna	Siyaram Singh	BJP	JD(U)

== Members of Parliament ==
The following is the list of the Members of Parliament elected from this Lok Sabha constituency.

Year	Name	Party
1952	Mathura Prasad Mishra	Indian National Congress
1952	Suresh Chandra Mishra	Indian National Congress
1952	Banarsi Pd. Sinha	Indian National Congress
1952	Nayan Tara Das	Indian National Congress
1957	Banarsi Prasad Sinha	Indian National Congress
1957	Nayan Tara Das	Indian National Congress
1962	Banarsi Prasad Sinha	Indian National Congress
1964^	Madhu Limaye	Samyukta Socialist Party
1967	Madhu Limaye	Samyukta Socialist Party
1971	Deonandan Prasad Yadav	Indian National Congress
1977	Shrikrishna Singh	Janata Party
1980	Deonandan Prasad Yadav	Indian National Congress (U)
1984	Deonandan Prasad Yadav	Indian National Congress
1989	Dhanraj Singh	Janata Dal
1991	Brahmanand Mandal	Communist Party of India
1996	Brahmanand Mandal	Samata Party
1998	Vijay Kumar Yadav	Rashtriya Janata Dal
1999	Brahmanand Mandal	Janata Dal (United)
2004	Jay Prakash Narayan Yadav	Rashtriya Janata Dal
2009	Lalan Singh	Janata Dal (United)
2014	Veena Devi	Lok Janshakti Party
2019	Lalan Singh	Janata Dal (United)
2024	Lalan Singh	Janata Dal (United)

^ by poll

== Election results ==
=== 2024 ===
2024 Indian general elections: Munger
Party	Candidate	Votes	%	±%
JD(U)	Lalan Singh	550,146	48.30	▼2.73
RJD	Kumari Anita	4,69,270	41.20	▲6.38
NOTA	None of the above	21,951	1.93	N/A
Majority		80,870	7.10	▼9.11
Turnout		11,39,184	55.52	▲0.62
JD(U) hold		Swing		

=== 2019 ===
2019 Indian general elections: Munger
Party	Candidate	Votes	%	±%
JD(U)	Rajiv Ranjan Singh	528,762	51.03	
INC	Nilam Devi	3,60,825	34.82	
Independent	Amarjit Patel	18,646	1.80	
Independent	Dina Saw	15,893	1.53	
Majority		1,67,937	16.21	
Turnout		10,36,441	54.90	
JD(U) gain from LJP		Swing		

=== General elections 2014 ===
2014 Indian general elections: Munger
Party	Candidate	Votes	%	±%
LJP	Veena Devi	352,911	36.80	
JD(U)	Lalan Singh	2,43,827	26.67	
RJD	Pragati Mehta	1,82,917	20.01	
SS	Ashok Kumar Singh	50,469	5.52	
Majority		1,09,084	11.93	
Turnout		9,14,442	53.17	
LJP gain from JD(U)		Swing		

=== General elections 2009 ===
2009 Indian general elections: Munger
Party	Candidate	Votes	%	±%
JD(U)	Lalan Singh	374,317	57.45	
RJD	Ram Badan Roy	1,84,956	28.38	
INC	Ram Lakhan Singh	27,929	4.29	
BSP	Mannu Mahto	10,827	1.66	
Majority		1,89,361	29.09	
Turnout		6,51,597	41.65	
JD(U) gain from RJD		Swing		

== See also ==
- Munger
- Munger Fort
- Munger district
- Munger division
- List of constituencies of the Lok Sabha
