= Banarsi Prasad Sinha =

Indian politician

Banarsi Prasad Singh

Member of Parliament, Lok Sabha
- In office 1952–1964
- Succeeded by: Madhu Limaye
- Constituency: Munger, Bihar

Personal details
- Born: 7 November 1899 Milki Village, Kharagpur, Bihar, British India
- Died: 1964 (aged 64–65)
- Party: Indian National Congress

Banarsi Prasad Singh (7 November 1899 – 1964) was an Indian politician. He was elected to the Lok Sabha, the lower house of the Parliament of India, from Munger in Bihar as a member of the Indian National Congress in 1952, 1957 and 1962.

He took part in various Congress movements and was imprisoned several times.

He died in 1964. The by-election triggered by his death was won by the socialist leader Madhu Limaye.
