= Vijay Kumar Yadav =

Vijay Kumar Yadav may refer to:

- Vijay Kumar Yadav (judoka), Indian judoka
- Vijay Kumar Yadav (Communist Party politician) (born 1929), Indian politician
- Vijay Kumar Yadav (Bihar Legislative Assembly politician), Indian politician
