= Ashok Rajpath =

- Road
- Location in Patna, India Ashok Rajpath (Bihar)
- Coordinates: 25°37′11″N 85°10′43″E
- Country: India
- State: Bihar
- City: Patna

Languages
  - Spoken: Hindi, English
- Time zone: UTC+5:30 (IST)
- PIN: 800004
- Planning agency: Patna Metropolitan Area Authority
- Civic agency: Patna Municipal Corporation

Ashok Rajpath is a road in Patna, the capital of Bihar. It is named after Ashoka, an Indian emperor of the Maurya Dynasty who ruled almost all of the Indian subcontinent from ca. 269 BCE to 232 BCE. It connects Patna with Patna city or Patna Sahib. Starting roughly from Golghar, it runs parallel to the Ganges River, and terminates at the Didarganj. It is a busy road owing to the presence of markets on one side and educational institutions of Patna University on the other side.

2.2 km-long double-decker flyover is being constructed on Ashok Rajpath. The flyover is starting from Kargil Chowk near Gandhi Maidan to Patna Science College. The four-lane flyover is targeted to be constructed with an expenditure of Rs 422 crore in three years by a Delhi-based firm, Gawar Construction Limited. After the completion of this project, vehicles will move at three levels – tier 2, tier 1 and add-grade level (the existing road). The grade level will remain the same. All the four lanes of tier 1 and tier 2 will have three exits for the PMCH via their multi-level parking before terminating near Patna Science College. The double-decker flyover and the Loknayak Ganga Path (Ganga Expressway) will be connected via Krishna Ghat.

Ashok Rajpath has several historical places either side of it, largely of various institutions such as Patna University including Patna Science College, Patna College and other colleges, PMCH, National Institute of Technology, Patna, Christ Church, Kargil Chowk, Government Polytechnic Patna-7, Takht Shri Harmandir Saheb, Pathar Ki Masjid, Wheeler Senate Hall, St. Joseph's Convent High School, Patna, B N College, Khuda Bakhsh Oriental Library, Golghar, Gandhi Maidan, on the northern side, and old shops and markets, private houses and some religious structures on the southern side of the street. The area is patrolled by the Pirbahore PS of Patna Police.

== Famous landmarks ==
- Patna Science College
- Khuda Bakhsh Oriental Library
- Patna College
- Takht Sri Patna Sahib
- Bihar National College
- Patna University
- Patna Medical College and Hospital
- National Institute of Technology, Patna
- Darbhanga House

== Problems ==
This road passes through one of the congested areas of the city where traffic at time can be very challenging.
