= Chandika Sthan =

Hindu temple in Munger, Bihar, India

Chandika Asthan
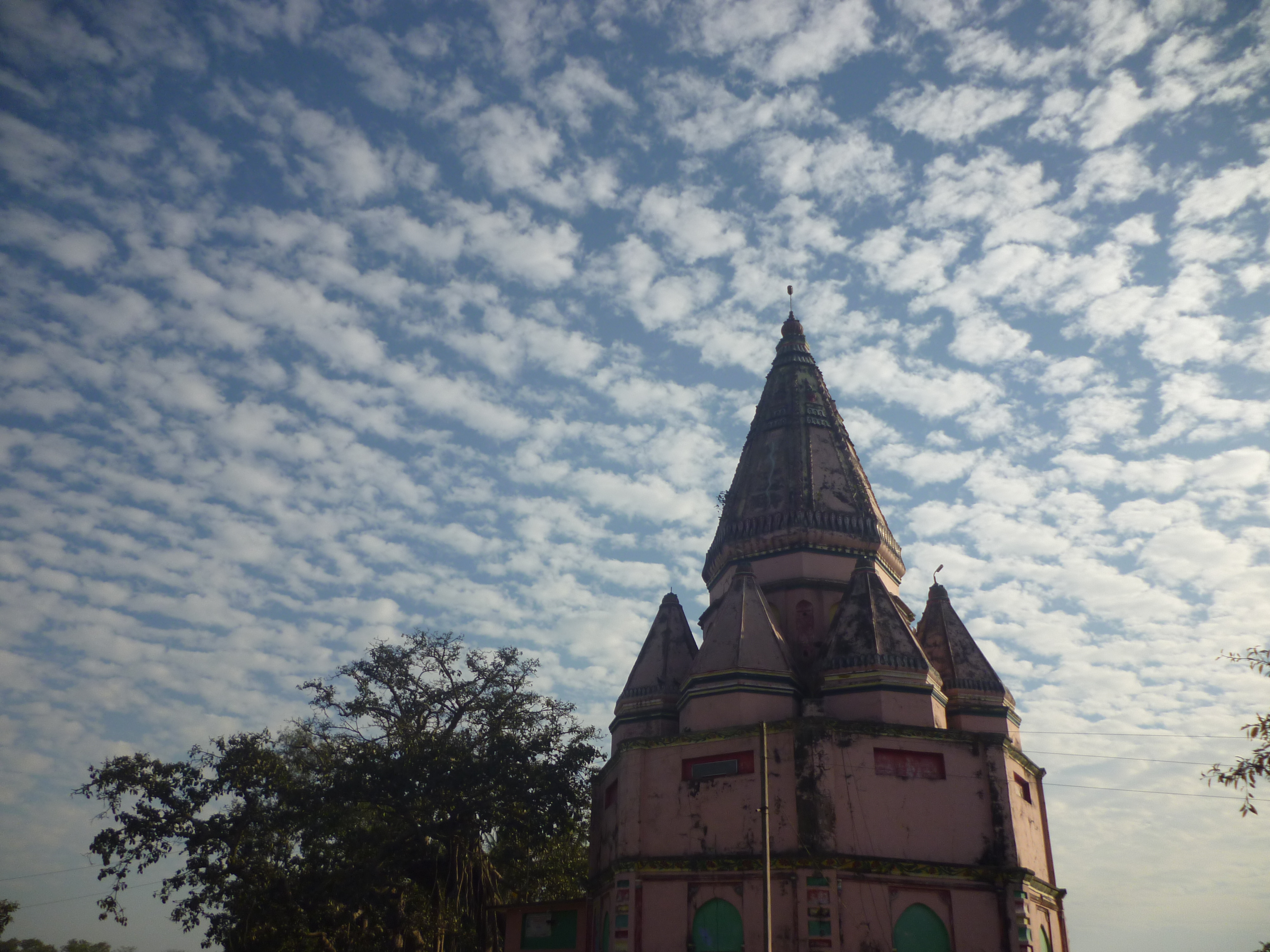
- View of Chandika Asthan at Munger, Bihar

- Location within Bihar Location within India Location within Asia

Religion
- Affiliation: Hinduism
- District: Munger
- Deity: Chandi
- Festival: Navaratri

Location
- Location: Basudevpur
- State: Bihar
- Country: India
- Interactive map of Chandika Asthan
- Coordinates: 25°23′32.8″N 86°28′51.3″E

Architecture
- Elevation: 42 m (138 ft)

Website
- https://munger.nic.in/tourist-place/chandi-asthaan

Chandika Sthan is a Hindu temple situated in Munger, in the India state of Bihar. It is one of the fifty-one Shakta pithas, places of worship consecrated to the goddess Shakti. On the Northeast corner of Munger, Chandika Sthan is just two kilometers away from the Munger town. Being a Siddhi-Peetha, Chandika Sthan is considered to be one of the most sacred and sanctified temples, as important as the Kamakshya temple near Guwahati. Sati's left eye fell here and it is believed that those who worship here get rid of eye pain. It is one of the major Hindu pilgrimage centre in Ang Pradesh region of Bihar.

== Legend ==
Legendary tales and the Hindu folklore says that it was to save the world from the anger of Shiva, as he took the corpse of Sati and wandered. The same legend says that the left eye of the Sati fell at Munger, which subsequently developed into a place of worship of the Divine Mother Chandi. Among the different Shakta pithas, Chandika Sthan is famous for the cure of eye troubles, as per the traditional belief of the local folklore.

== The Chandika Sthan Temple as a Shakta pitha ==
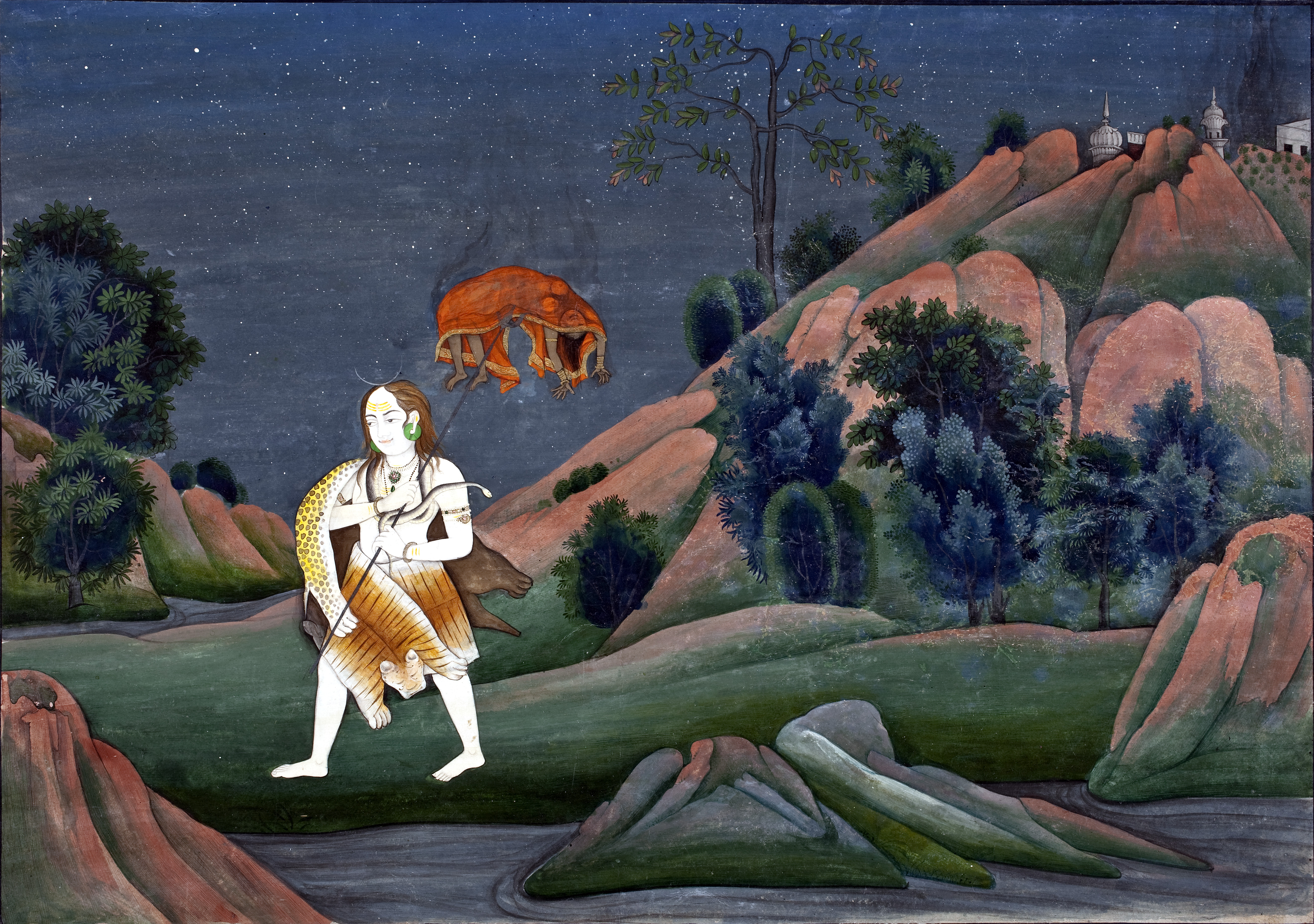
Shiva carrying the corpse of Sati Devi

The Chandika Sthan Temple is believed to be a Shakta pitha, the divine shrine of Shaktism. The mythology of Daksha Yaga and Sati's self-immolation and Shiva carrying the corpse of Sati Devi is the story of origin behind the Shakta pitha shrines. It is believed that Sati Devi's left eye has fallen here.

== King Karna ==
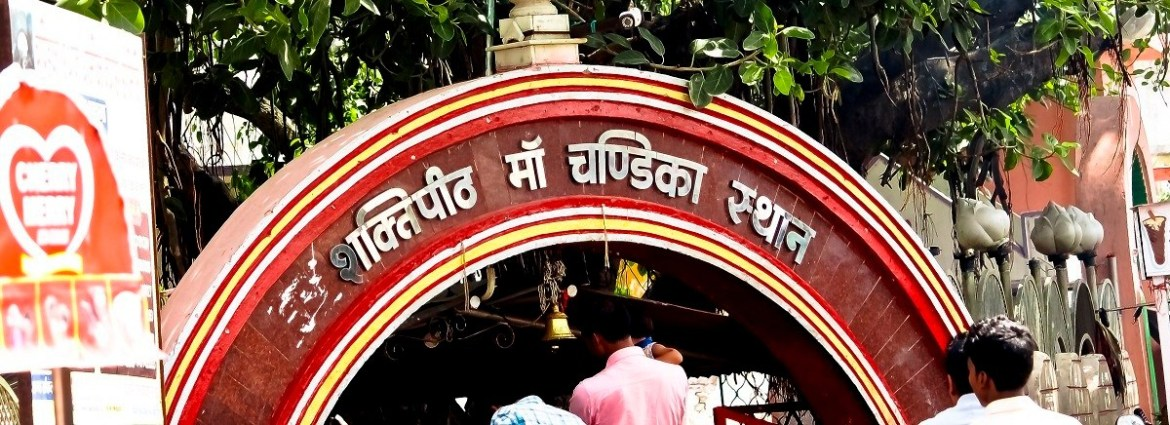
Sign at the gate

Another legend connected with Chandika Sthan is regarding King Karna of the ancient Indian kingdom of Anga, who used to worship Goddess Chandi Mata every day and in turn, the Goddess gave him 114 pounds (equivalent to 50 kilograms) of gold for distribution among the needy and downtrodden at Karanchaura, now a local name for the vicinity.

== Location ==
Chandika Sthan is approximately 1 km (0.62 mi) from ITC Ltd, Basudevpur, Munger. The nearest railway station is Munger Junction, and the nearest airport is Deoghar Airport preceding Patna Airport. On the Northeast corner of Munger, Chandika Sthan is 2 kilometres (1.2 mi) away from the Munger Town.
