= R.D. & D.J. College =

Degree college in Munger, Bihar, India

- Raja Deoki Nandan and Diamond Jubilee College
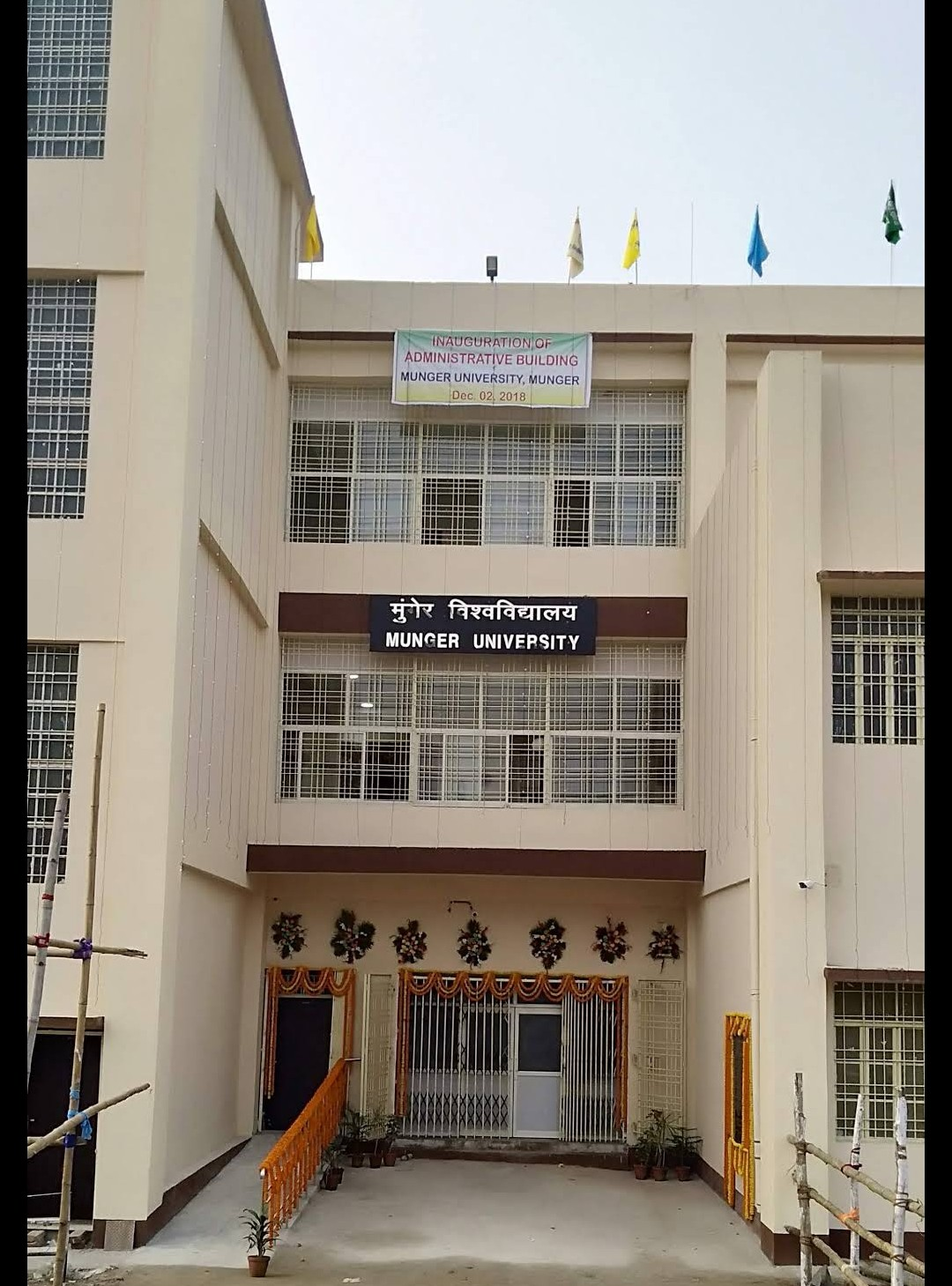
- Former name: Diamond Jubilee College (1898–1948)
- Motto: Satya Mev Jayate (Truth Alone Triumphs)
- Type: Public college
- Established: 3 April 1898
- Academic affiliations: Calcutta University (1898–1919); Patna University (1919–1952); Bihar University (1952–1964); Bhagalpur University (1964–2018); Munger University (since 2018)
- Principal: Prof. (Dr.) Bijendra Kumar
- Location: Munger, Bihar, India; 25°22′05″N 86°29′01″E
- Campus: Urban, 24.5 acres
- Website: rddjcollege.ac.in

Raja Deoki Nandan and Diamond Jubilee College, commonly known as R.D. & D.J. College, is a public degree college located in Munger, Bihar, India. Established in 1898, it is one of the oldest institutions of higher education in the region. Since 2018, it has operated as a part of Munger University.

== History ==
The college was established on 3 April 1898 as the Diamond Jubilee College to commemorate the Diamond Jubilee of Queen Victoria.

In 1920, the college acquired a 15-acre site for a permanent campus. The foundation stone for the new buildings was laid on 18 February 1921 by Lord Sinha, the Governor of Bihar and Orissa Province. In 1925, E.H. Johnston, the local collector of Munger, designed the college's Arts and Commerce block. The building was inaugurated shortly after by Sir Henry Wheeler, then Governor of the Bihar and Orissa Province.

In 1946, Rani Parmeshwari Devi donated ₹1,00,000 (approx. ₹5.71 crores adjusted for inflation) to the college in memory of her late husband, Raja Devaki Nandan Prasad Singh, the Zamindar of Munger. To honour this major contribution, the institution was officially renamed to R.D. & D.J. College (Raja Deoki Nandan and Diamond Jubilee College) in 1948.

Over the decades, the college has been affiliated with several different universities based on regional redistricting. It came under Bihar University in 1952. In 1960, the college celebrated its own diamond jubilee, an event attended by Dr. Rajendra Prasad, the first President of India. It later became a constituent unit of Tilka Manjhi Bhagalpur University. When the state government established Munger University in March 2018, the college was transferred to its jurisdiction.

== Academics and campus ==
The college offers undergraduate and postgraduate courses in arts, science, and commerce. It has 16 academic departments.

The Government of Bihar recognised the institution as a 'Centre of Excellence' in 2012. In 2017, the National Assessment and Accreditation Council (NAAC) awarded the college a "B" grade during its first cycle of accreditation.

The college is now located on a 24.5-acre campus in the Shastri Nagar area of Munger. The motto of the institution, "Satya Mev Jayate" (Truth Alone Triumphs), is inscribed on the main auditorium hall. The campus also houses the administrative block and main headquarters for Munger University.

In December 2023, the college hosted the first-ever convocation ceremony of the recently-formed Munger University, with the Governor of Bihar, Rajendra Arlekar, serving as the chief guest.

== See also ==
- Education in Bihar
- List of institutions of higher education in Bihar
- Raja Devaki Nandan Prasad Singh
- Munger University
