= Kastaharni Ghat =

Bathing place on the River Ganges

Religion
- Affiliation: Hinduism

Location
- Country: India
- Interactive map of Kastaharni Ghat
- Coordinates: 25°22′58.8″N 86°27′34.9″E

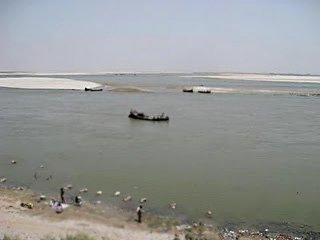
- Holy waters of the Ghat

Kastaharni Ghat is a ghat or bathing place on the River Ganges, at Munger in the Indian state of Bihar. Located on the banks of the Ganges River on the eastern side of Munger city, the ghat is important has important in both Hindu religious faith and tourism.

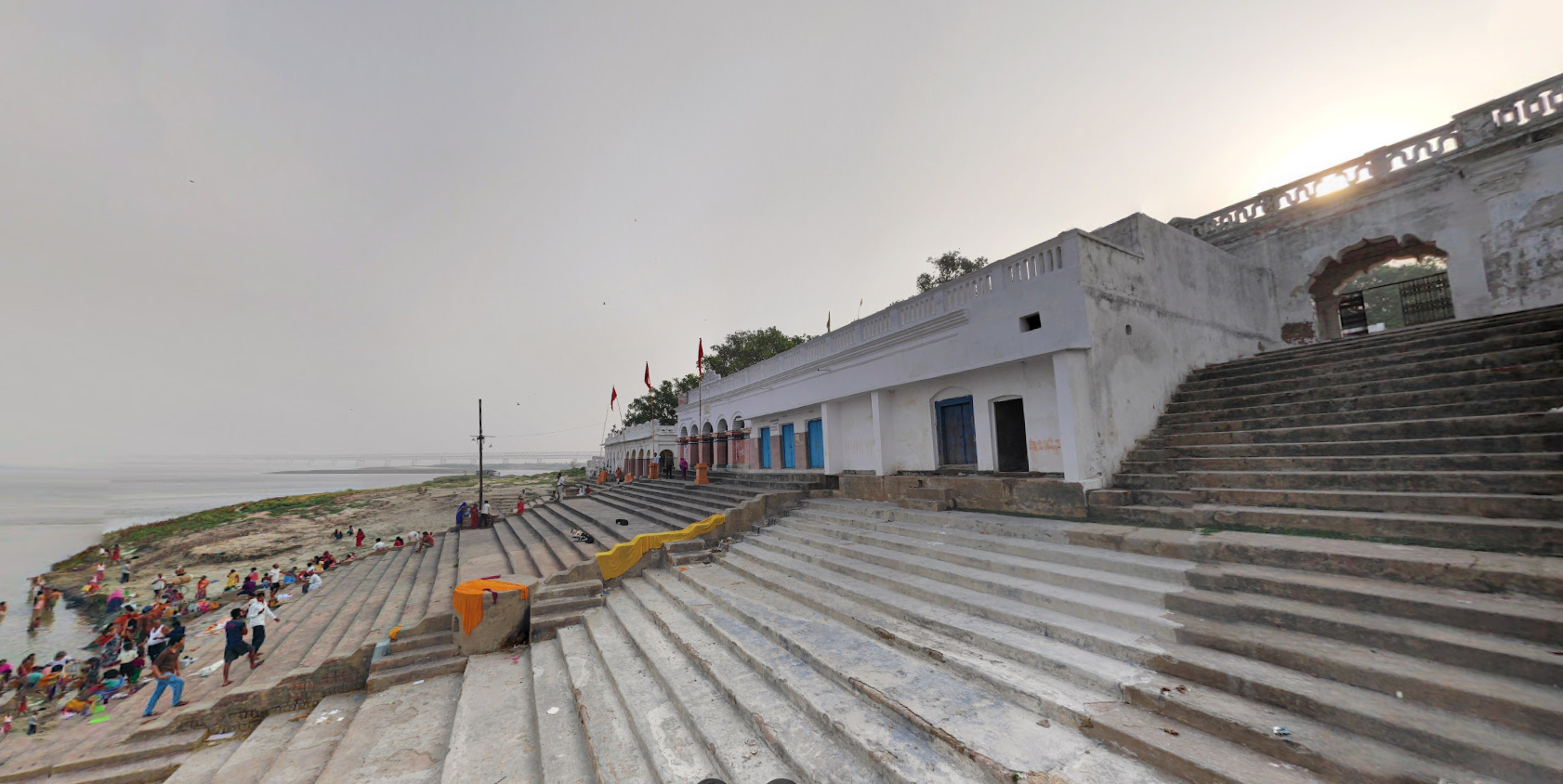
Kashtharni Ghat Munger

== History ==
In the sixth century CE, a Hindu sage named Mudgal Muni appeared in the city and established two shrines, one at a rock at Kashtaharini Ghat. In the 26th Adhyaya (chapter) of Adi Kanda of the Valmiki Ramayana, it is mentioned that both Lord Rama and his brother Lakshmana on their way back from the encounter with Taraka, the demoness, took rest at the spot. The relaxation they had given rise to the name of Kashtaharini Ghat. According to another account it was on his return journey from Mithila to Ayodhya after marrying Sita that Lord Rama bathed at this place to relieve himself from fatigue.

A copper plate known as the 'Munger Plate' was discovered in Munger in 1780. Mir Kasim conquered Munger and made it his capital till the army of the East India Company captured Munger.

== Religious significance ==
According to Hindu folklore, one who takes a dip in this ghat receives solace and cure from bodily pains. The name "Kastaharni Ghat" literally means "The bathing place which expels all pains". Its significance is enhanced by the northerly flow of the river at this point, which is termed Uttarvahini Ganga. The ghat premises is managed by Sri Jagannatha Temple Trust of Munger.
