= Ramdeo Singh Yadav =

Indian politician (1946–2022)

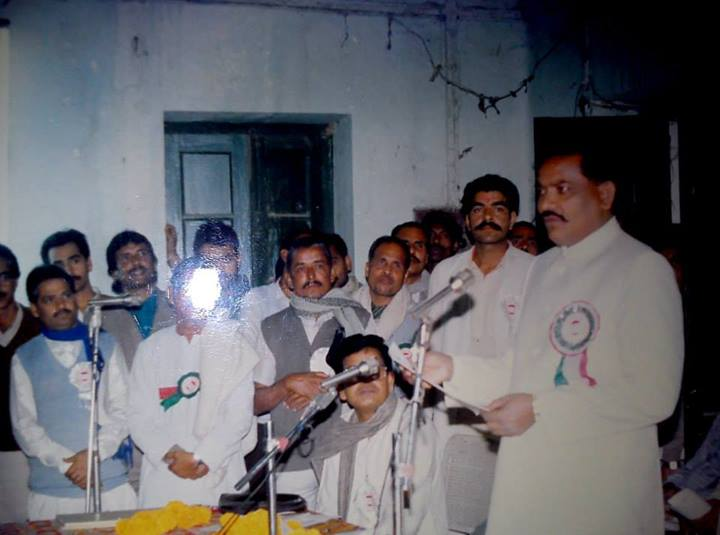
- Ramdeo Singh Yadav Member of Bihar Legislative Assembly from Munger 1980-1995

Co-operative minister of Bihar
- Chief Minister: Lalu Prasad Yadav

Member of the Bihar Legislative Assembly
- In office 1980–1995
- Preceded by: Syed Jabir Hussain
- Succeeded by: Monazir Hassan
- Constituency: Munger

Personal details
- Born: 5 July 1946 Munger, Bihar
- Died: 17 March 2022 (aged 75)
- Party: Janata Dal; Lokdal; Janata Party (Secular)
- Parent: Govind Yadav (Father)
- Education: Bachelor of Arts, Bhagalpur University
- Occupation: Politician; Social Work

Ramdeo Singh Yadav (5 July 1946 – 17 March 2022) was an Indian social worker and a MLA from Munger during the period of 1980 to 1995. He was the cabinet minister under the portfolio of Co-operative ministry from 1990 to 1995. His work included relieving farmers of Bihar of a loan amounting to Rs 10000. He was also in the news during his ministerial tenure due to his clashes with then chief minister of Bihar Lalu Prasad Yadav.

== Early life ==
Ramdeo Singh was born in Mahaddipur village, in Munger, British Raj, to the farming couple Govind Prasad Yadav and Dayavati Devi.

== Political career ==
=== Political career (from 1970 to 1980) ===
He was active in politics from his matriculation on. He was elected as president of the District Students Federation and actively participated in Munger by-elections. He campaigned in support of Jan Sangh and Jagdambi Prasad.

He was appointed District president of Samajwadi Jansabja Party when following the completion of his intermediate education.

During the general elections Yadav was attacked along with Madhu Limey, who was a candidate from Samajwadi Jansabja Party.

=== Political career (from 1980 to 1990) ===
In 1980 the Janata Party was divided into many smaller factions and parliament was dissolved. Yadav became the candidate for Lok Dal in Munger. He won the election as well as the next two, becoming the MLA from 1980 to 1995.

During his tenure, he promoted education projects, including renovating high schools in the area.

He was awarded the membership in the Senate of Bhagalpur University for exemplary contributions in the field of education.

He was elected as the president of Labour Union of ITC, Munger. He was also elected as president of the workers Union and labor Union of the Munger Gun Factory.

Apart from Munger Gun Factory & ITC he was also elected as the President of the Labour union of the Eastern Railways Workers.

=== Political career (from 1990 to 1995) ===
In 1990 he was again elected as MLA of Munger and appointed Co-operative Minister of government of Bihar. He was opposed by the chief minister and finally resigned his post in 1995.

== Personal life and death ==
Ramdeo Singh yadav was married and had three sons and one daughter. He died from a heart attack on 17 March 2022 at the age of 75.

== Gallery ==
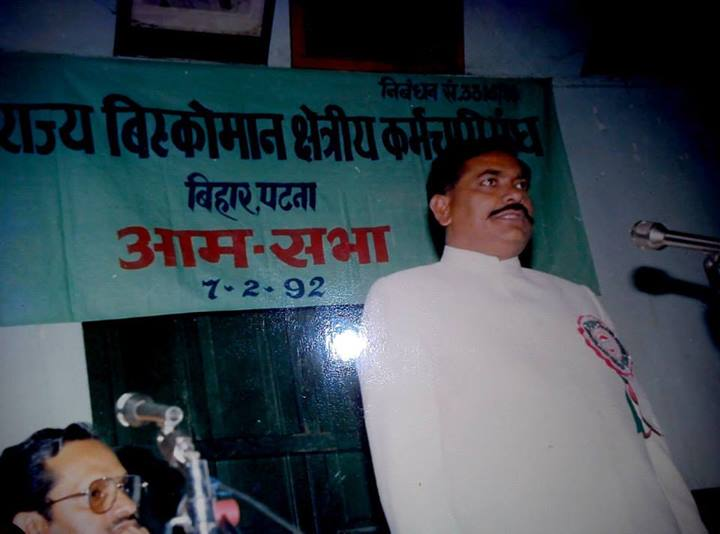

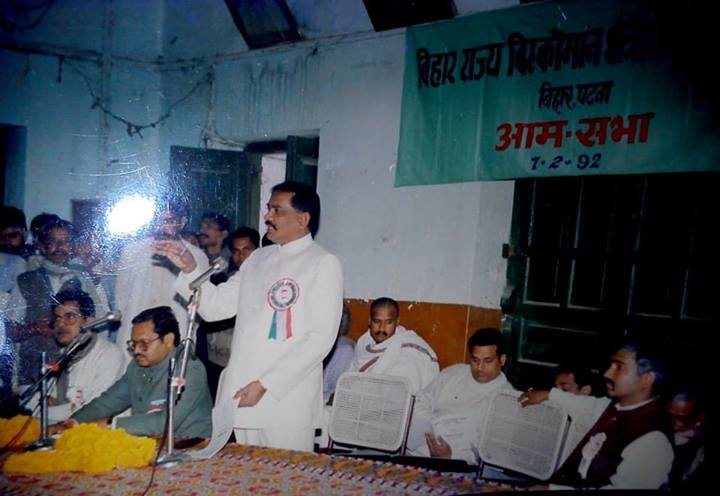

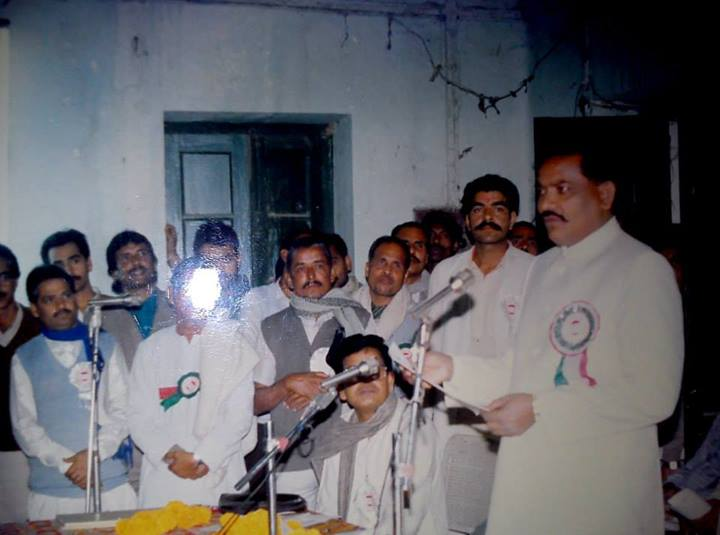

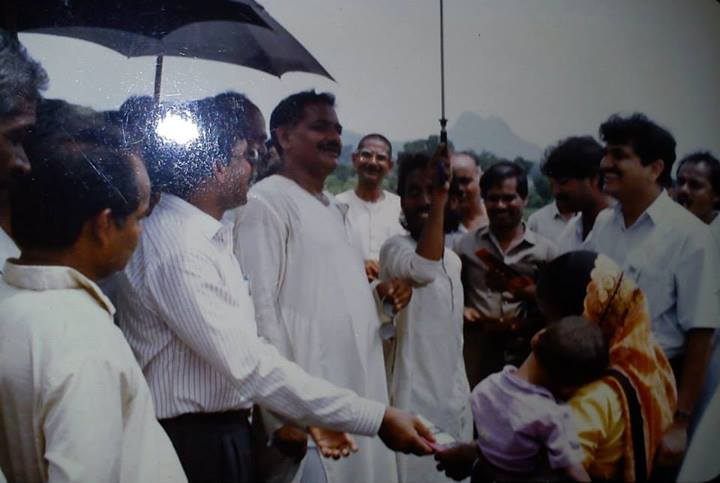

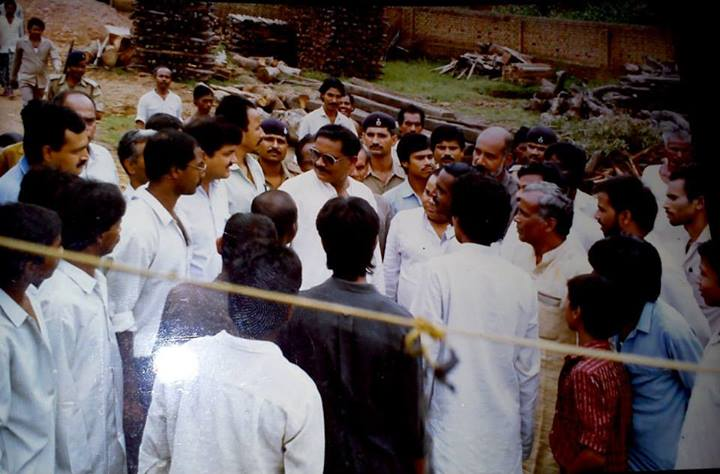

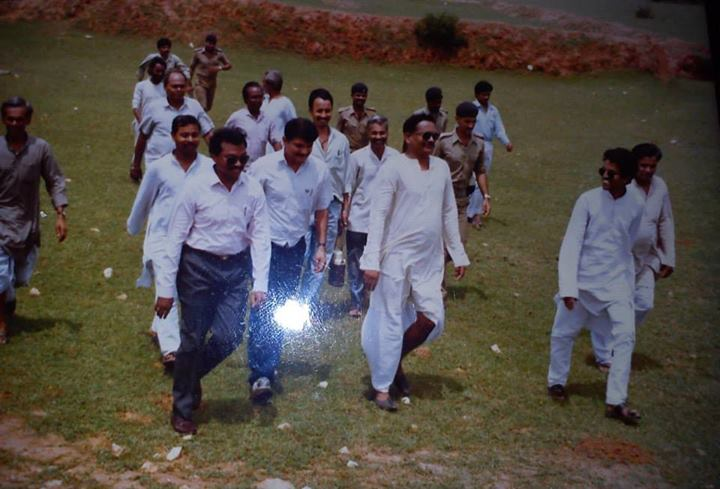

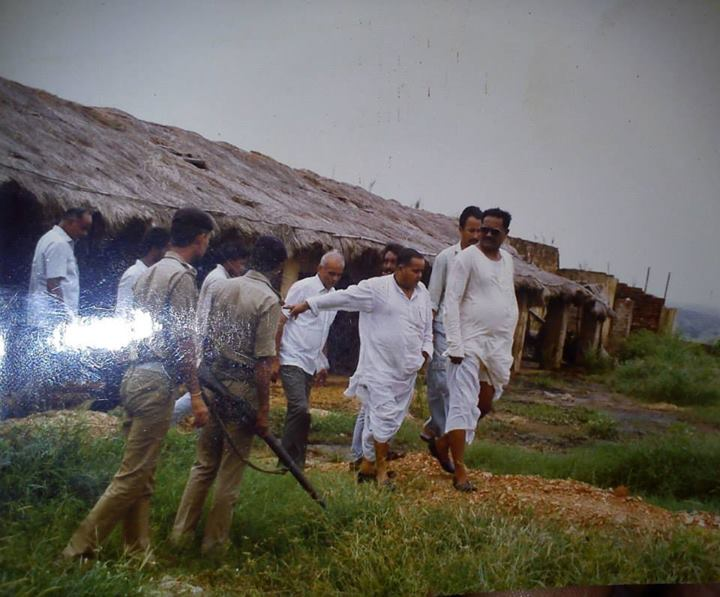
