= Raja Devaki Nandan Prasad Singh =

Indian zamindar and philanthropist

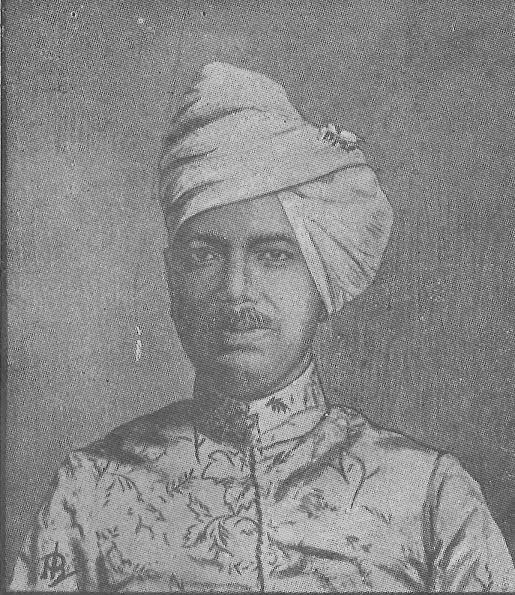
- Portrait of Raja Devaki Nandan Prasad Singh
- Born: Monghyr, Bengal Presidency, British India (present day Munger, Bihar, India)
- Occupations: Philanthropy, Zamindar
- Known for: Philanthropy, funding the Wheeler Senate House at Patna University
- Spouse: Rani Ramavati Devi (also known as Rani Parmeshwari Devi)
- Children: Raja Sachinandana Prasada Singh
- Father: Raja Shivanandan Prasad Singh
- Relatives: Raja Kamleshwari Prasad Singh (grandfather); Raja Sir Raghunandan Prasad Singh (uncle); Rajkumar Yadhunandan Prasad Singh (brother)

Raja Devaki Nandan Prasad Singh was a philanthropist from Munger in Bihar, India. He is known for his financial support to Patna University and for building temples in Munger and Vrindavan.

Devaki Nandan served as a nominated member of the Bihar and Orissa Legislative Council during the 1924–29 term, after the council’s expansion following the Montagu–Chelmsford Reforms and the Government of India Act 1919. During his tenure, Devaki Nandan voted against a resolution for total prohibition, arguing that the policy was financially infeasible and would severely impact the state's revenue.

== Family and personal life ==
Devaki Nandan Singh belonged to the royal family of the Munger estate. His father was Raja Shivanandan Prasad Singh, OBE. He was married to Rani Ramavati Devi, who is also recorded in some sources as Rani Parmeshwari Devi. They had a son named Raja Sachinandana Prasada Singh.

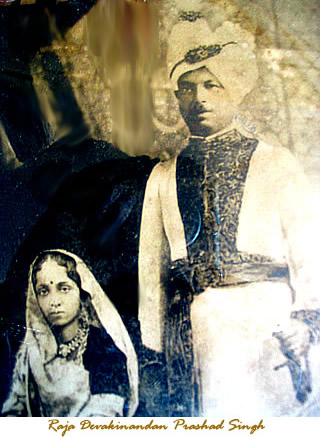
Raja Devaki Nandan Prasad Singh with wife Rani Ramavati Devi

The family followed Vaishnavism. Devaki Nandan spent time building and taking care of several Vaishnava Hindu temples in his home city of Munger and in the holy town of Vrindavan.

== Philanthropy and legacy ==
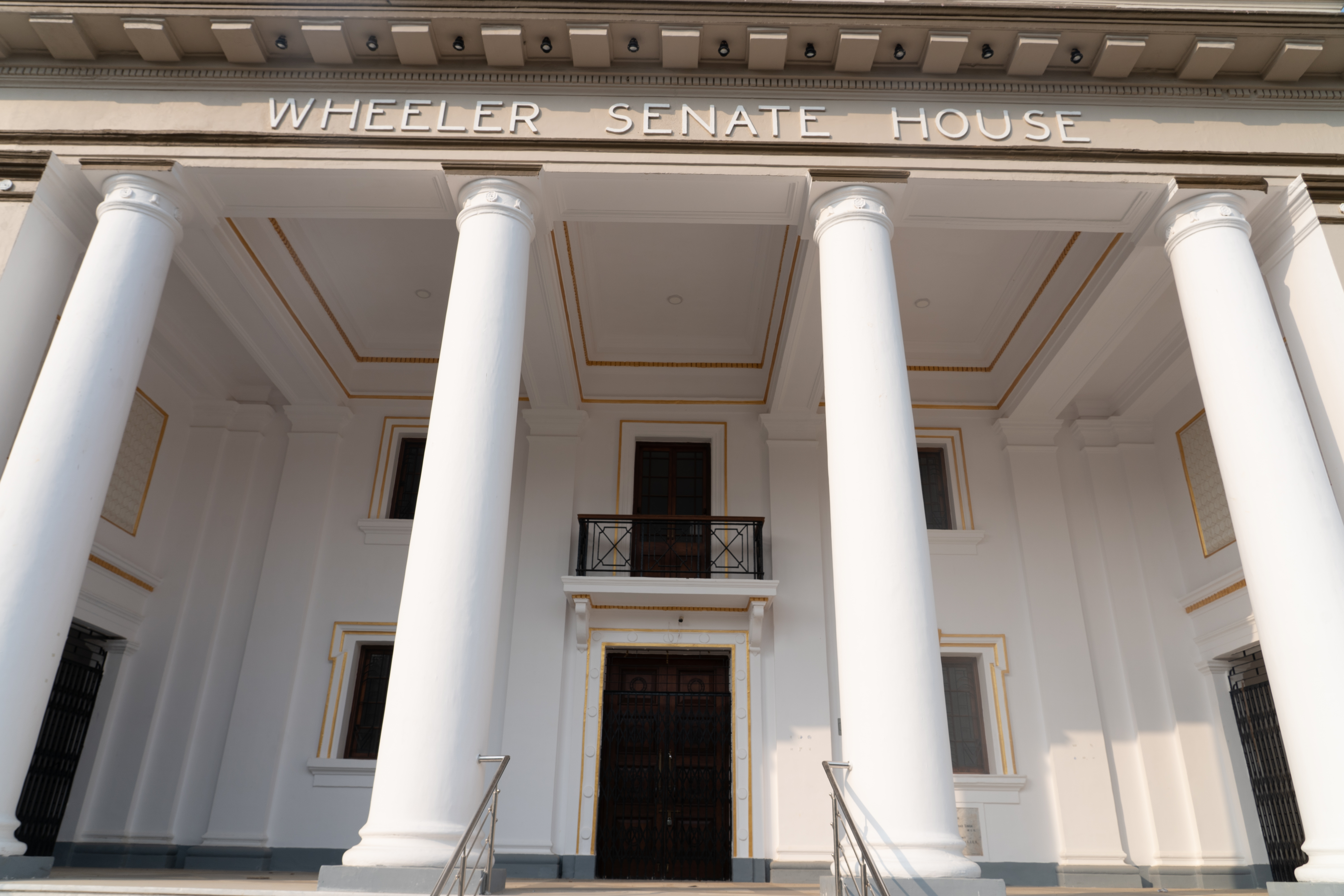
The Wheeler Senate House at Patna University, built entirely through Devaki Nandan’s funding in 1926.

In the early 1920s, Patna University needed a large building for its meetings, exams, and events. In 1925, Devaki Nandan Singh offered to pay the entire cost to build a new senate hall for the school. He gave a generous endowment of about ₹1.75 lakh (around ₹10 crore today, adjusted for inflation) to fund the project.

The building was inaugurated on March 20, 1926. It was named the Wheeler Senate House after Sir Henry Wheeler, who laid the foundation stone. Wheeler was the governor of Bihar and Orissa Province and the chancellor of the university at the time. After the opening ceremony, Singh hosted an "at home" gathering for the guests.

The 1,000-seat hall was designed with European architectural elements meant to rival the grandeur of halls at Oxford and Cambridge. The high-quality construction funded by Singh allowed the building to withstand the 1934 Bihar–Nepal earthquake.

For many decades, the Wheeler Senate House served as the traditional venue for the university's convocation ceremonies and senate meetings. The capacious hall hosted famous figures like Jawaharlal Nehru, Sarojini Naidu, and Lord Mountbatten. It was the site for several historic events, including the opening session of the Indian Science Congress in 1933 and a 1936 felicitation event for Nobel Laureate Rabindranath Tagore. The hall also hosted addresses from pioneering Indian scientists like Sir C. V. Raman, Jagadish Chandra Bose, and Satyendra Nath Bose.

After Singh's death, his wife continued the family's charitable work. In 1946, Rani Parmeshwari Devi donated ₹1,00,000 to the Diamond Jubilee College in Munger, which was originally established in 1898 to commemorate the Diamond Jubilee of Queen Victoria. To honor his memory and acknowledge the gift, the institution changed its name to R.D. & D.J. College (Raja Deoki Nandan and Diamond Jubilee College) in 1948.

== See also ==
- Patna University
- Zamindars of Bihar
