= Munger University =

Public university in Munger, Bihar, India

- Official logo of Munger University
- Motto: असतो मा सद्गमय, तमसो मा ज्योतिर्गमय
- Motto in English: Asato ma sadgamaya (From ignorance, lead me to truth) Tamaso ma jyotirgamaya ( From darkness, lead me to light)
- Type: Public
- Established: 18 March 2018; 8 years ago
- Affiliations: UGC
- Academic affiliations: UGC
- Chancellor: Governor of Bihar
- Vice-Chancellor: Dr. Sanjoy Kumar
- Dean: Dr. Bhavesh Chandra Pandey
- Director: Dr. Ghanshyam Roy
- Location: R.D. & D.J. College, Munger, Bihar, 811201, India; 25°22′02″N 86°29′04″E
- Campus: Urban
- Language: Hindi, English
- Website: www.mungeruniversity.ac.in

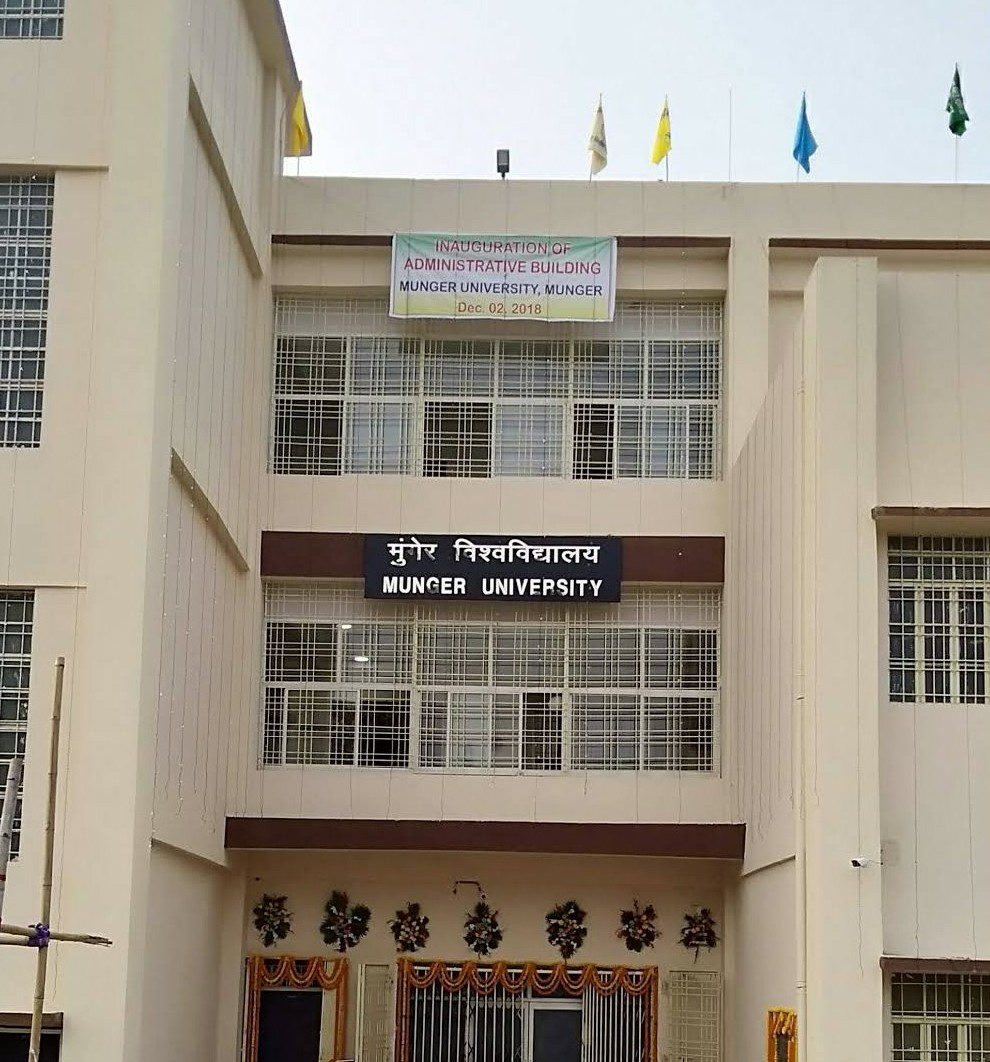
Administrative block of Munger University, located within the R.D. & D.J. College campus

Munger University is a state university and was established on 18 March 2018 through bifurcation of Tilka Manjhi Bhagalpur University, Bhagalpur. The university started operating academically from the 2018–19 academic year.

== History ==
Munger University came into existence on 18 March 2018 under the Bihar State Universities (Amendment) Act, 2016 (Bihar Act – 1/2017).

Bills pertaining to the creation of Munger, Purnia and Patliputra University were passed by the State Legislature in 2016. The formation of the university was notified in March 2018 in accordance with the Government pronouncement in the Gazette.

== Campus ==
The university is currently operating from the 25-acre campus of the R.D. & D.J. College near the New Police Headquarters in Munger.

== Colleges ==
There are 17 constituent colleges, 12 affiliated colleges, 5 single faculty education colleges (Affiliated B. Ed. Colleges) and one affiliated law college in the Munger University. As part of saat nischay-3 of Bihar Government, 19 new colleges have been opened under the Munger University.

Constituent colleges

- R.D. & D.J. College, Munger
- B.R.M. College, Munger
- Jagjivan Ram Shramik Mahavidyalaya (J.R.S. College), Jamalpur
- Jyoti Misri Singh (J.M.S.) College, Munger
- Jamalpur College, Jamalpur
- Ram Swarath College (R.S.) College, Tarapur, Munger
- Hari Singh (H.S.) College, Haveli Kharagpur, Munger
- Karyanand Sharma Smarak Mahavidyalaya (K.S.S. College), Lakhisarai
- B.N.M. College, Barhiya, Lakhisarai
- Deo Sundari Memorial (D.S.M.) College, Jhajha, Jamui
- Kabir Moti Darshan (K.M.D.) College, Parbatta, Khagaria
- Shri Krishna Ramruchi (S.K.R.) College, Barbigha, Sheikhpura
- K.K.M. College, Jamui
- K.D.S. College, Gogri Jamalpur, Khagaria
- Koshi College, Khagaria
- Ramadhin College (R.D.) College, Sheikhpura
- Mahila College, Khagaria
- Rajeshwar Lal College, Lakhisarai

Affiliated colleges

- Bishwanath Singh Institute of Legal Studies
- C N B College Hathiama, Sheikhpura
- Dhanraj Singh College Sikandra, Jamui
- International College Ghosaith, Lakhisarai
- M S College Alouli, Sonihar, Khagaria
- Mahila Mahavidyalaya Barhiya, Lakhisarai
- Phalguni Prasad Yadav College Chakai, Jamui
- R Lal College Lakhisarai
- Sanjay Gandhi Mahila College Sheikhpura
- Shyama Prasad Mahila College Jamui
- S A Eklavya Degree College Jamui
- S B N College Garhi Rampur, Munger
- S K College Lohanda, Jamui
- S S College, Mehus Sheikhpura

New Degree Colleges

- Rajkiye Degree Mahavidyalaya, Islamnagar Aliganj
- Rajkiye Degree Mahavidyalaya, Khaira
- Rajkiye Degree Mahavidyalaya, Laxmipur
- Rajkiye Degree Mahavidyalaya, Sono
- Rajkiye Degree Mahavidyalaya, Bariyarpur
- Rajkiye Degree Mahavidyalaya, Dharhra
- Rajkiye Degree Mahavidyalaya, Tetiya Bambar
- Rajkiye Degree Mahavidyalaya, Barsanda, Tetiya Bambar
- Rajkiye Degree Mahavidyalaya, Ariyari
- Rajkiye Degree Mahavidyalaya, Chewara
- Rajkiye Degree Mahavidyalaya, Ghatkusumba
- Rajkiye Degree Mahavidyalaya, Sheikhopur Sarai
- Rajkiye Degree Mahavidyalaya, Chanan
- Rajkiye Degree Mahavidyalaya, Halsi
- Rajkiye Degree Mahavidyalaya, Pipariya
- Rajkiye Degree Mahavidyalaya, Ramgarh Chowk
- Rajkiye Degree Mahavidyalaya, Beldaur
- Rajkiye Degree Mahavidyalaya, Chautham
- Rajkiye Degree Mahavidyalaya, Mansi
