= Patna University Students' Union =

- Location: Patna University

Patna University Students' Union (PUSU) is the elected representative body of students of Patna University in Patna, Bihar, India. The union represents students enrolled in the university and its constituent colleges and serves as a forum through which students participate in campus governance and raise issues related to academic life and student welfare.

Student politics at Patna University has historically attracted attention in Bihar because a number of individuals who were active in campus politics later entered public life and state politics.

== History ==
The Patna University Students' Union was established in 1959 following the introduction of a formal framework for student representation within the university.

Patna University, founded in 1917, is among the oldest universities in India and has long been regarded as an important centre of higher education in eastern India.

During the decades following independence, student politics at the university became closely intertwined with wider political developments in Bihar. The campus gained a reputation as an important site of political mobilisation and debate among students.

== Suspension of elections ==
Student union elections at Patna University were discontinued in 1984 amid concerns about campus violence and political tensions.

For nearly three decades the university functioned without an elected student union, and student representation was limited to other administrative mechanisms.

== Revival of elections ==
Elections to the student union were revived in 2012 following demands from student organisations and broader discussions regarding the restoration of elected student bodies in universities.

Since their revival, the elections have once again become a regular feature of campus life and have received coverage in regional and national media.

Recent elections have also drawn wider attention for developments in student representation and participation in university politics.

== Structure ==
The Patna University Students' Union is headed by a central panel elected by students of the university.

The central panel generally includes the following positions:

- President
- Vice-president
- General Secretary
- Joint Secretary
- Treasurer

These office-bearers are elected through student union elections conducted by the university.

== Student organisations ==
Candidates in the student union elections may contest independently or with the support of organised student groups active on campus. Student organisations that have participated in campus politics include:

- All India Students Association (AISA)
- National Students' Union of India (NSUI)
- Students' Federation of India (SFI)
- All India Students' Federation (AISF)
- Chhatra Rashtriya Janata Dal (CRJD)
- Akhil Bharatiya Vidyarthi Parishad (ABVP)
- Chhatra Janata Dal (United) (CJDU)

== See also ==
- Patna University
- Student politics in India
- Students' union
