= Pathar Ki Mosque =

Mosque in Patna, Bihar, India

Pathar Ki Masjid

Religion
- Affiliation: Islam
- Ecclesiastical or organisational status: Mosque
- Status: Active

Location
- Location: Patna, Magadh, Bihar
- Country: India
- Interactive map of Pathar Ki Masjid

Architecture
- Type: Medieval mosque
- Style: Indo-Islamic
- Completed: 1621
- Materials: Stone

The Pathar Ki Masjid stands on the bank of river Ganges near the Takht Shri Harmandir Saheb in the city of Patna. Parviz Mirza, son of Jahangir, established Pathar Ki Masjid in 1621. The structure is built of stone, and so it got its name as Pathar Ki Masjid. It is located on Ashok Rajpath between Sultanganj and Alamganj.

Pathar Ki Masjid is very popular among the local Islamic community. Apart from religious functions, this old mosque is a major landmark of the city.

Pathar Ki Masjid is also called Saif Khan's mosque, Chimmi Ghat mosque, and Sangi Masjid.
