= Deonandan Prasad Yadava =

Indian politician

Deonandan Prasad Yadava is an Indian politician from the state of Bihar.

He was elected in Indian general elections held in 1984 for the 8th Lok Sabha from the Monghyr He was 3 times MP from munger. He was former education minister and president of Central school organisation. seat in the state of Bihar.
