= Vijay Kumar Yadav (Bihar Legislative Assembly politician) =

Indian politician

Member of Bihar Legislative Assembly
- In office 2015–2020
- Preceded by: Anant Kumar Satyarthy
- Succeeded by: Pranav Kumar Yadav
- Constituency: Munger

Personal details
- Born: Munger, Bihar
- Party: Rashtriya Janata Dal
- Education: M.A.and LLB Bhagalpur University, Bihar
- Occupation: Politician social work

Vijay Kumar Yadav is an Indian politician who was elected as a member of Bihar Legislative Assembly from Munger constituency in 2015 as a candidate of Rashtriya Janata Dal.

== See also ==
- Munger Assembly constituency
