= Madhu Limaye =

Indian socialist essayist and activist (1922-1995)

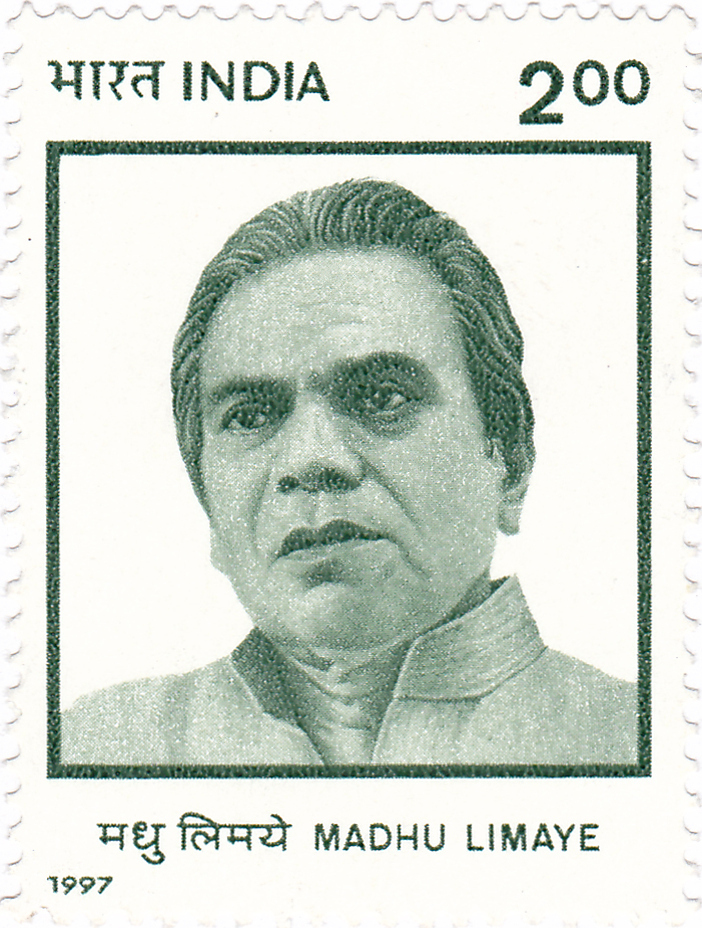
- Limaye on a 1997 stamp of India

Personal details
- Born: 1 May 1922 Pune, Bombay Presidency, British India
- Died: 8 January 1995 (aged 72)

Madhu Ramchandra Limaye (1 May 1922 – 8 January 1995) was an Indian socialist essayist and activist, particularly active in the 1970s. A follower of Ram Manohar Lohia and a fellow-traveller of George Fernandes, he was active in the Janata government that gained power at the Centre following the Emergency. He, with Raj Narain and Krishan Kant was also responsible for the collapse of the Morarji Desai-led Janata government installed by that coalition, by insisting that no member of the Janata Party could simultaneously be a member of an alternative social or political organisation. This attack on dual membership was directed specifically at members of the Janata Party who had been members of the Jan Sangh, and continued to be members of the right-wing Rashtriya Swayamsevak Sangh (RSS), the Jan Sangh's ideological parent. The issue led to fall of the Janata government in 1979, and the destruction of the Janata coalition.

In retirement, through the 1980s, he continued to write; he was especially caustic on Constitutional issues, where he set himself the task of defending the Constitution in the media against those who would seek to modify it to centralise power or to replace the Parliamentary system with a Presidential one, fearing a slow slide to despotism.

He showed less antipathy to the memory of Indira Gandhi than could have been expected, reserving his anger for Jawaharlal Nehru, who he seemed to think "could have set a standard beyond reproach, but did not."

== Life ==
=== Early life ===
Madhu Limaye, was born in the Brahmin family of Ramchandra Mahadev Limaye in Pune on 1 May 1922. He was educated at the Fergusson College, Poona (now Pune). He married Professor Champa Limaye and had one son. He was previously associated with the Indian National Congress, 1938—48 and the Congress Socialist Party, 1938—1948. His education was interrupted due to participation in the freedom movement. He was imprisoned for 4 years between 1940 and 1945.

=== Socialist ===
Attended Socialist International’s Antwerp conference as a sole delegate of Indian Socialist Movement, 1947. Elected, Member National Executive of the Socialist Party at Nasik Conference, 1948. Joint Secretary, Socialist Party, 1949—52. Secretary Asian Socialist Bureau, Rangoon, 1953. Elected, Joint Secretary, Praja Socialist Party at its first Conference at Allahabad, 1953.

=== Goan independence movement ===
On 25 July 1955, on behalf of the Goa Vimochan Sahayak Samiti (Goa Liberation Aid Committee), he arrived at Parsem (Pernem) along with 85 satyagrahis, as part of the Satyagraha movement in Goa. The Portuguese police then arrested and imprisoned him. On 26 July 1955, following a trial in the Territorial Military Tribunal, he was sentenced to 10 years in prison. However, he was released on 2 February 1957.

He wrote a book titled Goa Liberation Movement and Madhu Limaye as a prison diary. The book was published in 1996 on occasion of golden jubilee of the launch of the movement in 1946.

=== Parliamentarian ===
Chairman, Socialist Party 1958–59. Chairman Samyukta Socialist Party Parliamentary Board, 1967–68. Leader, Socialist Group in Fourth Lok Sabha, 1967.

Term as Member of Parliament

- (i) Third Lok Sabha, 1964—67 from Munger (won by-poll)
- (ii) Fourth Lok Sabha, 1967—71 from Munger
- (iii) Fifth Lok Sabha, 1973—77 from Banka (won by-poll)
- (iv) Sixth Lok Sabha 1977–79 from Banka.
- He lost General Elections to Lok Sabha from Munger in 1971 and Banka in 1980.

=== Janata Party ===
Played an active part in the JP Movement and in an effort to create a united opposition party. He was detained under the Maintenance of Internal Security Act (MISA) from July 1975 to February 1977 in various Madhya Pradesh Jails. Resigned in protest, from membership of the fifth Lok Sabha, on immoral extension of its term by Indira Gandhi through abuse of constitutional provisions about emergency. general secretary, Janata Party 1 May 1977–79. general secretary, Janata Party (S) and Lok Dal, 1979–82. Retired from active politics in 1982 after the formation of Lok Dal (K). Wrote more than 60 books in English, Hindi and Marathi.

== Social activities ==
Associated with youth organisations, inspiring speeches, study groups, seminars, libraries, social reform movement and periodicals.

== Legacy ==
He was responsible for personally grooming many of the names that dominate Bihar politics today, including Laloo Prasad Yadav and Sharad Yadav. The library of Dr. Ram Manohar Lohiya National Law University, Lucknow (RMLNLU), the Madhu Limaye Library, is named after him. A street in Chanakyapuri, New Delhi is named in his honour.

=== Madhu Limaye Elocution Competition ===
To commemorate his contribution to the parliamentary debate, every year Madhu Limaye inter-Collegiate Elocution Competition is organised in Kirti College on his death anniversary i.e. on 8 January. The competition is funded by “Madhu Limaye Smriti Nyas’ a trust formed by Late Smt. Champatai Limaye and is organised every year by Elocution and Debating Association of Kirti college, (Dadar West). The main purpose of this event is to make the college going students think and brood over the contemporary topics and current issues, which may not come in the realm of their textbooks. Madhu Limaye Memorial Rolling Trophy is awarded to the winning college. The competition is now exerting a favourable influence on student community. Kirti college has organised this competition relentlessly since last nine years. The purpose of this competition is to find out the truth about the chosen topic and vivisect the burning issue from all possible angles. The Coordinator of this elocution competition opines that the purpose of an elocution competition is to find out the truth about the chosen topic and vivisect the burning issue from all possible angles. It is certainly not intended merely for amusement of the audience, although it may add to the interest of the listeners to enliven the proceedings and sustain their interest in an otherwise serious subject. Students from degree college are eligible to participate in this competition..

== Publications ==
=== In English ===
- Where is the left going?
- Tito's Revolt against Stalin
- Communist Party: Facts and Fiction
- Socialist Communist Interaction in India
- Evolution of the Socialist Policy
- Political Horizons
- Indian Polity in Transition
- India and the World
- Madhu Limaye on Famous Personalities
- Galaxy of Indian Socialist Leaders
- The Age of Hope: Phases of the Socialist Movement
- Politics After Freedom
- The Sino-Indian War: Its Historical and International Background
- Goa Liberation Movement and Madhu Limaye
- Manu, Gandhi, Ambedkar and other Essays
- Religious Bigotry: A Threat to the Ordered State
- Parliament, Judiciary, and Parties – An Electrocardiogram of Politics
- Janata Party Experiment – Part I & II
- Limits to Authority
- Political Controversies and Religious Conflicts in Contemporary India
- Decline of a Political System
- Indian Politics at Crossroads
- Mahatma Gandhi and Jawaharlal Nehru: A Historic Partnership 1916–1948 (Vol. I—Vol. IV)
- Cabinet Government in India
- Problems of India's Foreign Policy
- Indian National Movement: Its ideological and Socio-Economic Dimensions
- Decline of a Political System: Indian Politics at Crossroads
- Birth of Non-Congressism: Opposition Politics (1947–1975), Musings on Current Problems and Past Events
- Contemporary Indian Politics
- President Vs Prime Minister
- Prime Movers: Role of the Individual in History
- Barren Path
- Four Pillar State
- The New Constitutional Amendments
- A Self Liquidating Scheme for Reservation
- Supreme Court's Decision on Backward Class Reservation
- August Struggle – An Appraisal of Quit India Movement
- Dear Popat
- Last Writings
- Madhu Limaye in Parliament (A Monograph on Madhu Limaye containing many of his important speeches in Lok Sabha, Published by Lok Sabha Secretariat – Parliament of India).

=== In Hindi ===
- Atmakatha
- Sardar Patel – Suvyavasthit Rajya Ke Preneta
- Baba Saheb Ambedakar – Ek Chintan
- Sankramankaleen Rajneeti
- Dharam Aur Rajneeti
- Rashtrapati Banam Pradhanmantri
- Swatantrata Andolan Ki Vichardhara
- Samasyein Aur Vikalp Marxvaad Aur Gandhivaad
- Aarakshan Ki Neeti
- Bhartiya Rajneeti Ke Antarvirodh
- Bhartiya Rajneeti Ka Sankat
- Sarvajanik Jeevan Main Naitikata Ka Lop
- August Kranti Ka Bahuaayami Paridrashya
- Ayodhya – Vote Bank Ki Vidhwansak Rajneeti
- Communist Party: Kathni Aur Karni
- Mahatma Gandhi – Rashtrapita Kyoon Kehlate Hain
- Rajneeti Ki Shatranj – VP Se PV Tak, Bharatiya Rajneeti Ka Naya Mod
- Aapatkaal: Samvaidhanik Adhinayakvad Ka Prashast Path
- Chaukhamba Raj – Ek Rooprekha.

=== In Marathi ===
- Trimantri Yojna
- Communist Zahirnamyachi Shambhar Varshey
- Pakshantar Bandi? Navhey Aniyantrit Neteshahichi Nandi
- Swatantraya Chalvalichi Vichardhara
- Communist Paksachey Antrang
- Samajwad Kaal, Aaj Vva Udya
- Chaukhamba Rajya
- Rashtrapita
- Doctor Ambedkar – Ek Chintan
- Pech Rajakaranatale
- Atmakatha
