= Wheeler Senate Hall =

Wheeler Senate House
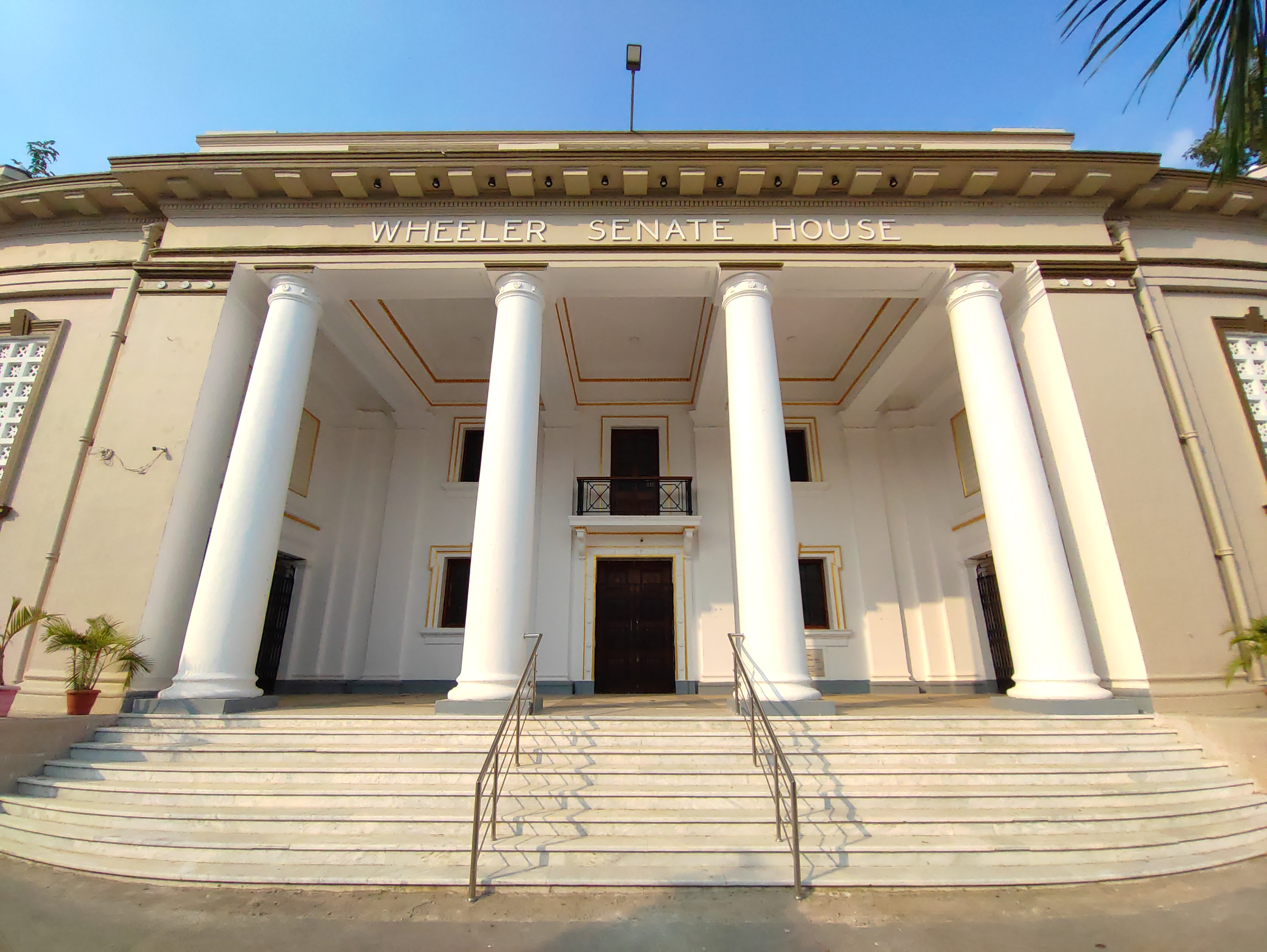
- The Senate Hall of the University of Patna

General information
- Location: Patna University, Ashok Rajpath, Patna, India
- Construction started: 1925
- Completed: 1926
- Cost: ₹1.75 lakhs (approx. ₹10 crores adjusted for inflation)
- Client: University of Patna

Design and construction
- Developer: Raja Devaki Nandan Prasad Singh

Other information
- Seating capacity: 1,000

The Wheeler Senate House is a convention centre of the Patna University situated in the heart of Ashok Rajpath, Patna.

== History ==
The structure was built to host Patna university meetings, convocations and other functions. Raja Devaki Nandan Prasad Singh of Munger had offered to meet the entire cost of building the senate hall in 1925 and had spent nearly ₹1.75 lakh on the hall. It got ready in 1926 and was inaugurated the same year by the then Governor of Bihar and Orissa province and Chancellor of the University Sir Henry Wheeler.

Before the construction of the senate hall, meetings, conferences and convocations of the Patna University were held at different places in the city. During the first five years of PU's existence from 1917 to 1922, it was allowed to use a wing of the Patna High Court as its temporary office. Meetings of the faculties were held in the hall located at the new college, now known as Patna College, while senate meetings were held in the conference room of the Patna Secretariat.

University convocations were held in the Durbar hall of the Governor House, present day Raj Bhavan building prior to wheeler Senate hall.

The structure has witnessed personalities such as Lord Mountbatten, Sarojini Naidu, Sardar Vallabhbhai Patel, C. D. Deshmukh, V. K. R. V. Rao, Vijaya Lakshmi Pandit and Jayaprakash Narayan, who addressed university convocations there. Scientists such as Jagadish Chandra Bose, Sir C. V. Raman, Meghnad Saha, Satyendra Nath Bose and Sisir Kumar Mitra once addressed university students and faculty members.

It is in the hall that poet Rabindranath Tagore was felicitated on 17 March 1936 soon after he won the Nobel prize.

Many historic public meetings held in 1946 had Jawaharlal Nehru, the first prime-minister of India, face embarrassment owing to then communal disturbances in the state.

== Present day ==
The Wheeler senate hall located at Ashok Rajpath in the state capital is engaged mostly for university examinations. Some senate meetings or exhibitions are also held. With a seating capacity of 1,000, the senate hall has undergone numerous renovations.
