= Munger railway station =

Railway station in Munger, Bihar, India

Munger
- Munger railway station building as of September 2026

General information
- Location: Purabsarai, Refugee Colony, Munger, Bihar; India
- Coordinates: 25°30′53″N 86°50′38″E
- Elevation: 59 metres (194 ft)
- System: Indian Railways station
- Owner: Indian Railways
- Operator: Eastern Railways
- Line: Jamalpur–Khagaria and Sahibpur Kamal lines, Munger–Ratanpur line (Jamalpur Bypass)
- Platforms: 2
- Tracks: 3

Construction
- Structure type: At-grade
- Parking: Yes
- Accessible: Available

Other information
- Status: Functional
- Station code: MGR
- Zone(s): Eastern Railway zone
- Division(s): Malda

History
- Opened: 1862; 164 years ago JMP - MGR section
- Electrified: 2020
- Former names: Monghyr
Location
- Location within Bihar Location within India

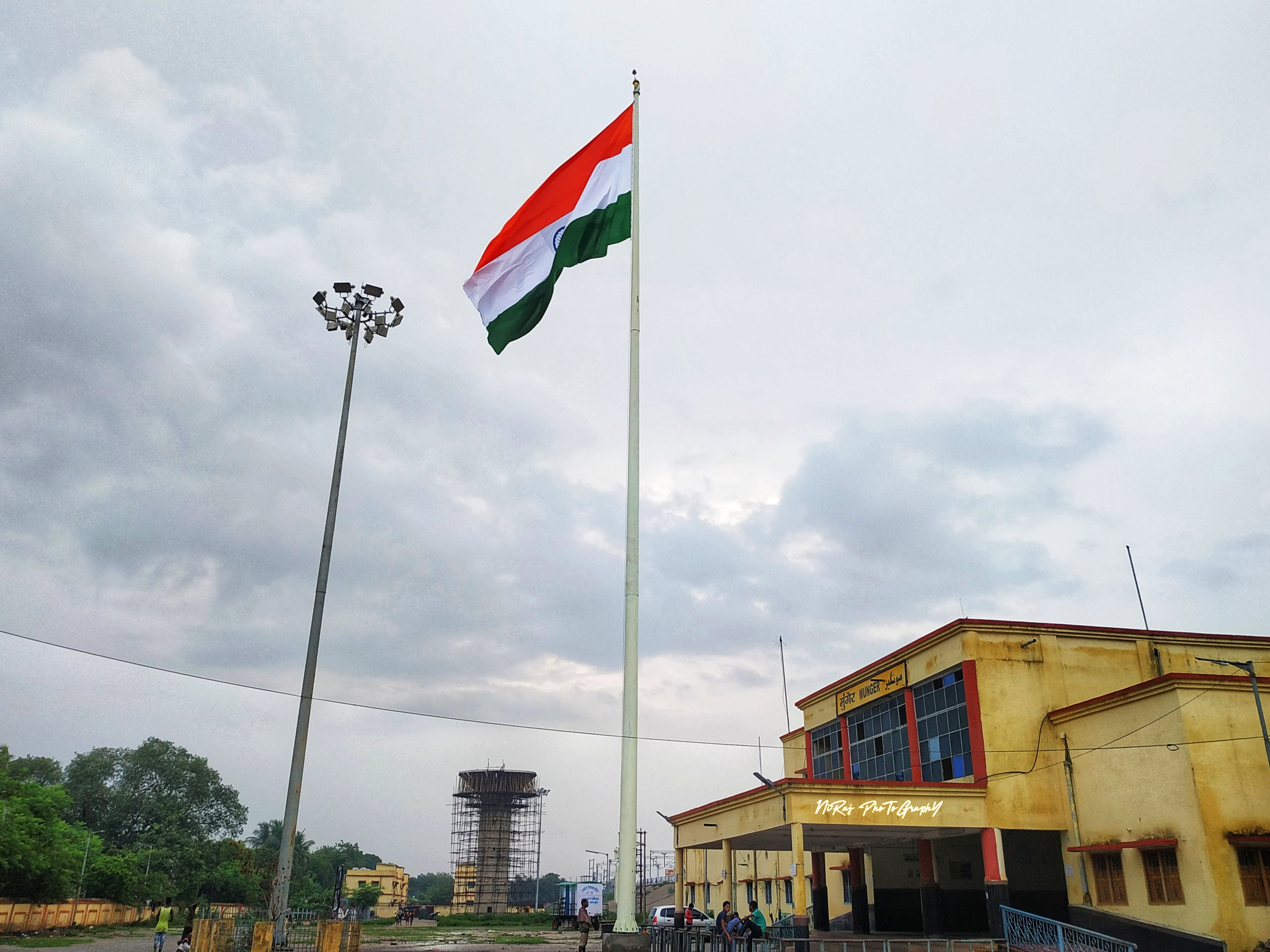

Munger railway station (station code: MGR), is the railway station serving the Munger city in the Munger district in the Indian State of Bihar.

== Background ==
The previous railway station was closed for making Munger Ganga Bridge and a new railway station, 2.1 kilometer southeast from old one towards Purabsarai locality, on the new broad-gauge line, has been constructed and opened on 11 April 2016. Electrification completed in year 2020.

Munger railway station is now the main rail head for Munger city after Jamalpur Junction. Munger is part of the Malda railway division of the Eastern Railway zone of the Indian Railways.

== Connectivity ==
Munger is connected to metropolitan areas of India like Delhi–Kolkata, Sahibganj loop and Barauni–Guwahati line also connected through recently opened Rail cum Road Munger Ganga Bridge. The new Munger railway station is located at 25.22°N 86.28°E It has an average elevation of 59 metres (194 ft). The station is located about 1.2 km from Munger Fort .

== Platforms ==
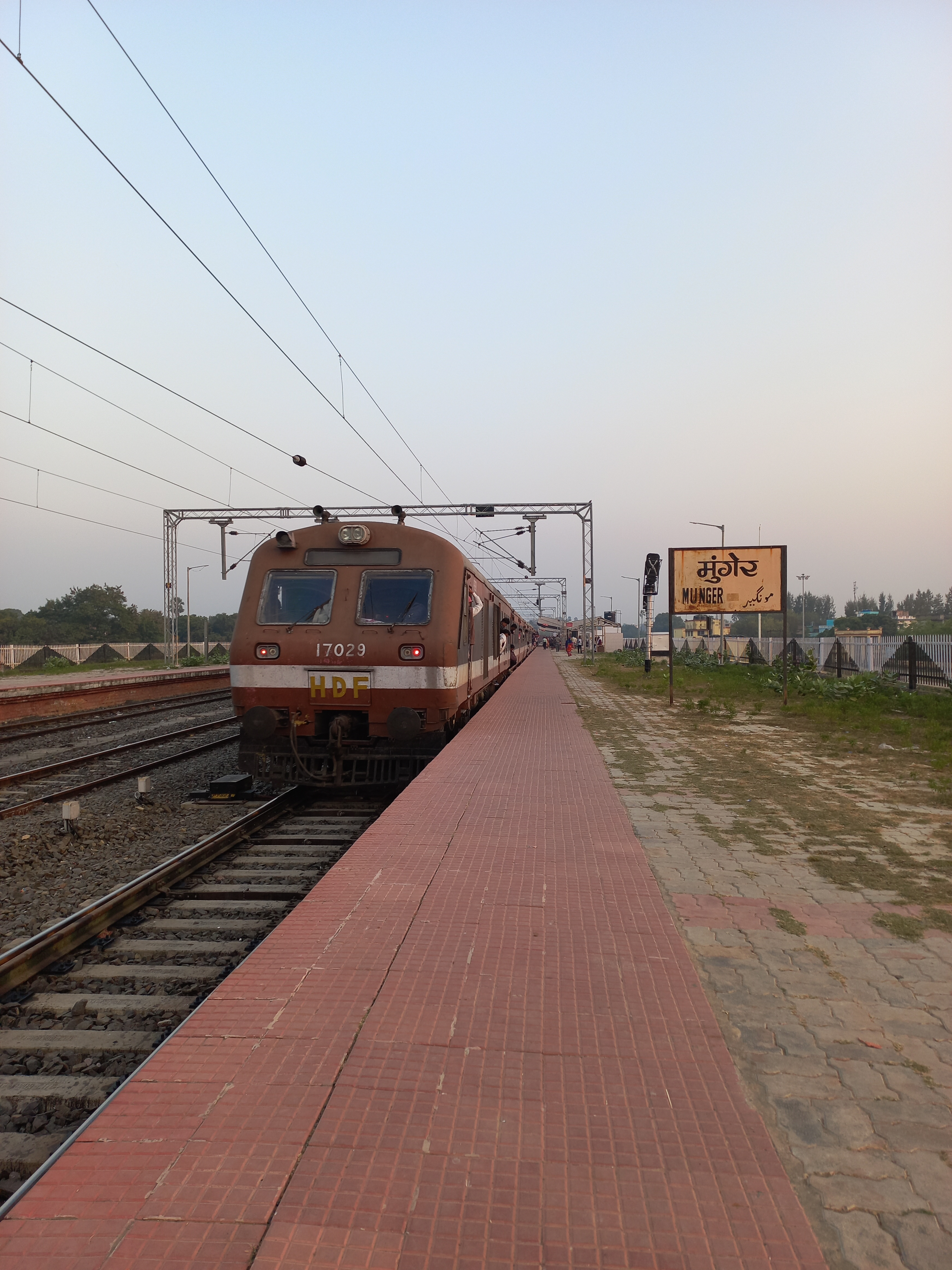
Platform No.1

There are 3 tracks with 2 platforms in Munger station. The platforms are interconnected with subway. There is space to construct 2 more platforms if needed in future. All 3 tracks are fully electrified.

== Trains ==
- Deoghar-Agartala Weekly Express
- Deoghar-Deoghar Weekly Express
- Jaynagar-Bhagalpur Express
- Godda-Gomti Nagar Weekly Express

== See also ==
- Munger
- Munger District
- Jamalpur Junction railway station
