= Pranav Kumar Yadav =

Indian politician

Member of Bihar Legislative Assembly
- In office 2020–Incumbent
- Preceded by: Vijay Kumar Yadav
- Constituency: Munger

Personal details
- Party: Bharatiya Janata Party
- Education: B.A. Honors (Political Science) Tilka Manjhi Bhagalpur University
- Occupation: Politician social work

Pranav Kumar Yadav is an Indian politician who was elected as a member of Bihar Legislative Assembly from Munger constituency in 2020 as a candidate of Bharatiya Janata Party. In 2015 he lost the election to Vijay Kumar Yadav of Rashtriya Janata Dal.

== Controversy ==
During the Ram Navami violence, Bihar in 2023, the local Muslim people of Bihar had accused MLA Pranav Kumar Yadav of inciting the Hindutva Mob.

== See also ==
- Munger Assembly constituency
