= Munger Assembly constituency =

Coordinates: 25°23′34″N 86°30′02″E

Munger
- Constituency No. 165 for the Bihar Legislative Assembly

Constituency details
- Country: India
- Region: East India
- State: Bihar
- District: Munger
- Lok Sabha constituency: Munger
- Established: 1957
- Total electors: 341,931

Member of Legislative Assembly
- 18th Bihar Legislative Assembly
- Incumbent Kumar Pranay
- Party: BJP
- Alliance: NDA
- Elected year: 2025

Munger is an assembly constituency in Munger district in the Indian state of Bihar. In 2015 Bihar Legislative Assembly election, Munger will be one of the 36 seats to have VVPAT enabled electronic voting machines.

== Members of the Legislative Assembly ==
Year	Member	Party
1957	Nirpad Mukherji	Indian National Congress
1962	Ramgovind Verma	Indian National Congress
1967	Hasim	Samyukta Socialist Party
1969	Ravish Chandra Verma	Bharatiya Jana Sangh
1972	Prafulla Kumar Mishra	Indian National Congress
1977	Jabir Husain	Janata Party
1980	Ramdeo Singh Yadav	Janata Party (Secular)
1985	Ramdeo Singh Yadav	Lokdal
1990	Ramdeo Singh Yadav	Janata Dal
1995	Monazir Hassan	Janata Dal
2000	Monazir Hassan	Rashtriya Janata Dal
2005	Monazir Hassan	Janata Dal (United)
2005	Monazir Hassan	Janata Dal (United)
2009^	Vishwanath Prasad Gupta	Rashtriya Janata Dal
2010	Anant Kumar Satyarthy	Janata Dal (United)
2015	Vijay Kumar Yadav	Rashtriya Janata Dal
2020	Pranav Kumar Yadav	Bharatiya Janata Party
2025	Kumar Pranay	Bharatiya Janata Party

== Election results ==
=== 2025 ===
Bihar Assembly election, 2025: Munger
Party	Candidate	Votes	%	±%
BJP	Pranay Kumar	108,028	51.12	+5.38
RJD	Avinash Kumar Vidyarthi	89,278	42.25	−2.74
AIMIM	Monazir Hassan	3,598	1.7	
Independent	Santosh Kumar Mandal	2,035	0.96	
NOTA	None of the above	3,075	1.46	−0.4
Majority		18,750	8.87	+8.12
Turnout		211,307	61.8	+13.07
BJP gain from		Swing	NDA	

=== 2020 ===
2020 Bihar Legislative Assembly election: Munger
Party	Candidate	Votes	%	±%
BJP	Pranav Kumar	75,573	45.74	+2.69
RJD	Avinash Kumar Vidyarthi	74,329	44.99	−0.64
Independent	Shalini Kumari	4,497	2.72	
NOTA	None of the above	3,076	1.86	+0.74
Majority		1,244	0.75	−1.83
Turnout		165,216	48.73	−5.52
BJP gain from RJD		Swing		

=== 2015 ===
Bihar Assembly election, 2015: Munger
Party	Candidate	Votes	%	±%
RJD	Vijay Kumar "Vijay"	77,216	45.63	
BJP	Pranav Kumar Singh	72,851	43.05	
Independent	Subodh Verma	4,008	2.37	
Independent	Basudeb Sharma	3,562	2.1	
Sarvajan Kalyan Loktantrik Party	Arvind Kumar	3,121	1.84	
NOTA	None of the above	1,898	1.12	
Majority		4,365	2.58	
Turnout		169,228	54.25	
RJD gain from JD(U)		Swing		
