= Brahmanand Mandal =

Indian politician (born 1947)

Brahmanand Mandal (14 January 1947 - 30 January 2024) was an Indian politician who served as a member of the Lok Sabha from Munger constituency for three terms under three different political parties: in 1991, as a member of the Communist Party of India, in 1996 under the Samata Party, and re-elected in 1999 as part of Janata Dal (United). He was a former President of Samata Party (now led by its President Uday Mandal).

== Background ==
Brahmanand Mandal was born on 14 January 1947 in Jhawa, Bahiyar, in the Munger district of Bihar. He was educated at Parbatta College of Tilka Manjhi Bhagalpur University in Parbatta, and worked as a farmer.

From 1964, he was a member of the Communist Party of India, and by 1970, a member of the CPI State Council in Bihar. Mandal led the Bekari Ke Sawal Par Andolan in 1969 and was jailed. He also led Bhoomi Mukti Andolan from 1970 to 1971, and described himself as having "struggled for social causes and suffered imprisonment." He led an agitation against Taufir Kand in which nine persons were killed and 400 houses were burnt in 1986, and succeeded in convicting the guilty through a special court. He also led an agitation against Tirasi Hatya Kand in which five persons were kidnapped and murdered in 1990, and helped in the arrest of the guilty persons. He formed Jagriti and agitated for the construction of a rail cum road bridge over the River Ganga in Munger. In 1994 he and his followers went on a hunger strike for the demand of a rail cum road bridge over the River Ganga in Munger. After 14 days of his hunger strike the then Minister of Commerce and Dy. Chairman of Planning Commission Sri Pranav Mukherjee gave the assurance of the construction of the bridge.

== Lok Sabha career ==
In 1991 he was elected to the 10th Lok Sabha on the CPI ticket, and served on first on the Consultative Committee of the Ministry of Human Resource Development, then on the Standing Committee; in 1994, he became a Member of the Standing Committee on Railways. In 1996, he joined George Fernandes' Samata Party and became a member of their National Executive. He was elected to the 11th Lok Sabha, in which he served as the Samata Chief Whip, and as a member of the Committee on Food, Civil Supplies and Public Distribution, and of the Consultative Committee, Ministry of Railways. He became Secretary General of the Samata Party of Bihar, and the All India Secretary General of the Samata Party. He was not elected to the 12th Lok Sabha, losing to Bijoy Kumar Bijoy of Rashtriya Janata Dal, but was once more elected to the 13th Lok Sabha (defeating Bijoy Kumar Bijoy 346,615 (49.15%) to 324,800 (46.05%)).

In the 13th Lok Sabha, Mandal served as Deputy Chief Whip for the JD(U) Parliamentary Party, and as a member of the Committee on Finance, Committee on Government Assurances, and Joint Committee on Patents (Second Amendment) Bill, 1999, and (from 2000 onwards) the Consultative Committee, Ministry of Commerce and Industry.

== Samata merger ==
When in October 2003, George Fernandes, the president of the Samata Party, announced that the party would be completely merging with the Janata Dal (United), a minority in the SP led by Mandal refused to go along with the merger. The Election Commission of India decided that the merger was not technically complete and so a faction was allowed to function under the Samata Party name.

He unsuccessfully ran in the 2006 by-election from Nalanda (Lok Sabha constituency) in 2006. He contested in the 2009 Indian general election for 15th Lok Sabha from Munger Lok Sabha constituency as an independent candidate, but was not successful, receiving less than 1% of the vote.

== Personal life ==
On 19 December 1977, he married Kiran Kumari (Mandal); they have one son and one daughter. Their home is in Bekapur. He has published one book, Monghyr Ka Vikas aur Ganga Pul, and booklets on "Monghyr Vikas Aur Sangharsh".

== Death ==
Mandal succumbed to a prolonged illness and died on January 30th, 2024.
