= Patna University =

Public university in Patna, Bihar, India

Coordinates: 25.6199015°N 85.1653075°E

- Official seal of PU
- Other name: PU
- Motto: Satyaṃ tveva vijijñātyitavyam (Sanskrit)
- Motto in English: The Desire To Seek The Truth Should Be Your Defined Quest
- Type: Public State University
- Established: 1 October 1917; 108 years ago
- Accreditation: NAAC (B+)
- Affiliations: UGC
- Budget: ▲₹568.9 crore
- Chancellor: Governor of Bihar
- Vice-Chancellor: Prof. Ajay Kumar Singh
- Location: Ashok Rajpath, Near Patna College, Patna University Campus, Patna, Bihar, 800005, India
- Campus: Urban
- Language: English; Hindi
- Colors: Red & White
- Website: pup.ac.in

Patna University (PU) is a Public State University located in Patna, Bihar, India. It was established on 1 October 1917 during the British Raj. It is the first university in Bihar and the seventh oldest university in the Indian subcontinent in the modern era. The university offers various undergraduate and postgraduate degree courses.

== History ==
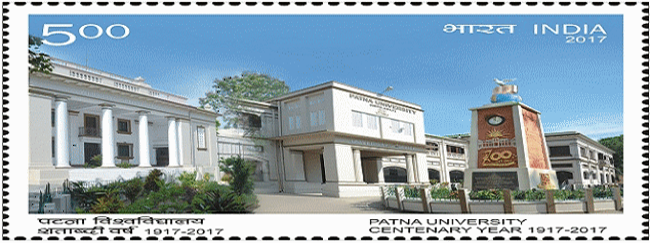
Patna University depicted on a 2017 stamp.

Patna University was established by an Act of the Imperial Legislative Council passed in September 1917. It began its journey in October 1917 as an affiliating and examining body when J.G. Jennings took charge of the university as its first vice-chancellor. In modern era of India, it is one of the oldest universities in the region. Later in 1919, the governing bodies of the university — the Senate and the Syndicate — were formed. The iconic Wheeler Senate House of the Patna University was built in 1926, funded by a donation from Raja Devaki Nandan Prasad of Munger. When the university was first established, it had jurisdiction over all higher educational institutes of Bihar, Odisha, and the Kingdom of Nepal. It oversaw examinations for educational institutions ranging from school finals to the postgraduate levels. This situation continued almost four decades, until the establishment of Tribhuvan University, Kathmandu, and Utkal University, Bhubaneshwar. On 2 January 1952, it was converted into a purely teaching-cum-residential university with territorial jurisdiction over only metropolitan Patna. The university buildings are mostly located on the banks of the Ganges River and in the Saidpur Campus.

== Organisation and administration ==
=== Governance ===
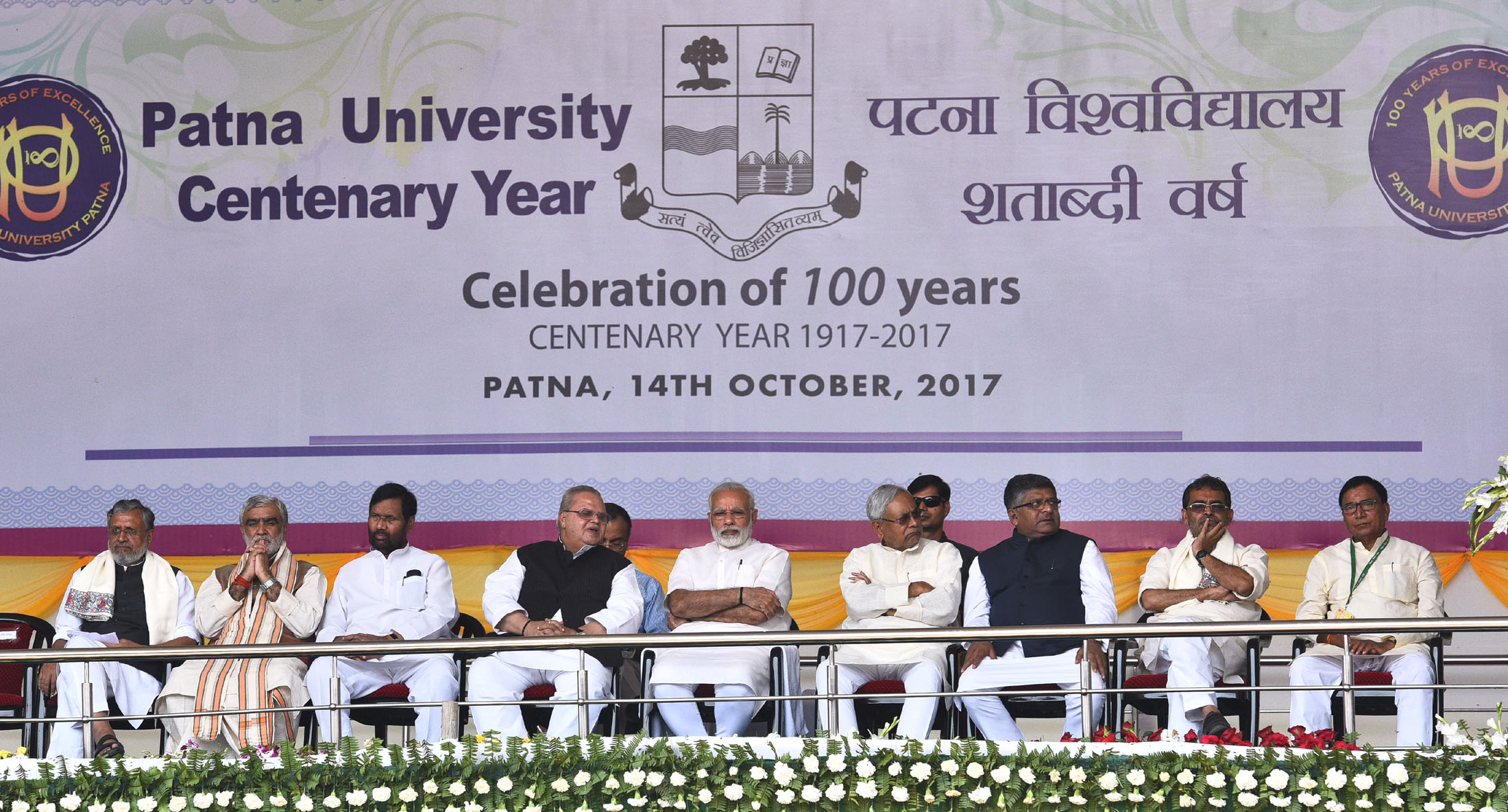
Narendra Modi, Nitish Kumar, Upendra Kushwaha and others at centenary celebration of Patna University.

The Chancellor of Patna University is the governor of Bihar. The vice-chancellor of the university is the chief executive officer, currently Dr. Ajay Kumar Singh.

=== Faculties and departments ===
Patna University has 30 departments organised into eight faculties: Science, Humanities, Commerce, Social Sciences, Education, Law, Fine Arts and Medicine.

- Faculty of Science: This faculty consists of the departments of Physics, Chemistry, Mathematics, Botany, Zoology, Statistics, and Geology.
- Faculty of Humanities: This faculty consists of the departments of English, Hindi, Bangla, Sanskrit, Maithili, Persian, Philosophy, Arabic, and Urdu.
- Faculty of Social Sciences: This faculty consists of the departments of History, Geography, Psychology, Ancient Indian History, Archaeology, Economics, Personnel Management and Industrial Relations, Sociology, Political Science, and Public Administration.
- Faculties of Law, Education, Commerce, Fine Arts, and Medicine: Each of these faculties comprises only one department, namely Law, Education, Commerce, Fine Arts, and BDS.

=== Affiliations ===
The university is an affiliating institution and has jurisdiction over the Patna city. Eleven colleges are affiliated with the university.

=== Patna University Students' Union ===
The Patna University Students' Union (PUSU) is the representative body of students of Patna University.

=== PUSU elections ===
In the 2026 PUSU elections, Shantanu Shekhar of the National Students' Union of India (NSUI) was elected president. Khushi Kumari of NSUI was elected general secretary, while Sifath Faiz, an independent candidate, was elected vice-president. Abhishek Kumar was elected joint secretary and Harsh Vardhan was elected treasurer.

== Academics ==
=== Traditional and distance education ===
The university and its affiliated colleges and institutions offer undergraduate and postgraduate courses in fields including law, teacher training, science, arts, commerce, medicine, and engineering. Admission in these courses is mainly based on the result of common entrance test (CET) conducted by Patna University. The aspirants for research-level programs have to sit for a qualifying test (RET) followed by an interview. Since 1974, the university also has a Directorate of Distance Education for conducting postgraduate studies in distance education.

=== Libraries ===
Central Library of the Patna University was set up in 1919. Besides the central library, there are also departmental libraries in each department of the university. The university library has a collection of more than 4,00,000 volumes which include books, journals, manuscripts, patents, and other valuable collections.

=== Ranking and accreditation ===
Patna University is recognized under Section 12B of the UGC Act. In 2019, the National Assessment and Accreditation Council (NAAC) awarded 'B+' grade to the Patna University in the first cycle of the university's accreditation.
