= Jehanabad Assembly constituency =

Assembly constituency in Bihar, India

- Constituency No. 216 for the Bihar Legislative Assembly

Constituency details
- Country: India
- Region: East India
- State: Bihar
- District: Jehanabad
- Lok Sabha constituency: 36 Jehanabad
- Established: 1951
- Total electors: 302,681

Member of Legislative Assembly
- 18th Bihar Legislative Assembly
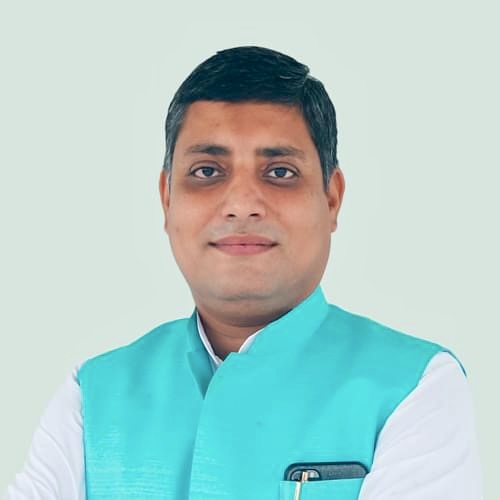
- Incumbent Rahul Sharma
- Party: RJD
- Alliance: MGB
- Elected year: 2025

Jehanabad Assembly constituency is an assembly constituency in Jehanabad district and South Bihar region of Bihar. It is the part of Jahanabad (Lok Sabha constituency).

== Overview ==
There are 2,86,098 voters in the constituency of which 1,50,106 are male, 1,35,984 female and 8 others. In 2015 Bihar Legislative Assembly election, Jehanabad assembly constituency is one of the 36 seats to have VVPAT enabled electronic voting machines.

== Members of the Legislative Assembly ==
Year	Member	Party
1952	Sheobhajan Singh	Socialist Party
1967	Mahabir Chaudhary	Indian National Congress
1977	Ram Chander Yadav	Janata Party
1980	Tara Gupta	Indian National Congress
1985	Syed Asghar Hussain	Indian National Congress
1990	Hari Lal Yadav	Independent politician
1995	Mudrika Singh Yadav	Janata Dal
2000	Munni Lal Yadav	Rashtriya Janata Dal
2005	Sachidanand Yadav	Rashtriya Janata Dal
2010	Abhiram Sharma	Janata Dal (United)
2015	Mudrika Singh Yadav	Rashtriya Janata Dal
2018^	Suday Yadav	Rashtriya Janata Dal
2020	Suday Yadav	Rashtriya Janata Dal
2025	Rahul Sharma	Rashtriya Janata Dal

== Election results ==
=== 2025 ===
2025 Bihar Legislative Assembly election: Jehanabad
Party	Candidate	Votes	%	±%
RJD	Rahul Sharma	86,402	44.64	▼2.39
JD(U)	Chandeshwar Prasad	85,609	44.23	▲18.45
JSP	Abhiram Sharma	5,760	2.98	
Independent	Ritesh Kumar	4,330	2.24	
NOTA	None of the above	4,577	2.36	▲0.86
Majority		793	0.41	▼20.84
Turnout		193,541	63.94	▲10.47
RJD hold		Swing		

=== 2020 ===
Bihar Assembly election, 2020: Jehanabad
Party	Candidate	Votes	%	±%
RJD	Suday Yadav	75,030	47.03	−3.84
JD(U)	Krishnanandan Prasad Verma	41,128	25.78	
LJP	Indu Devi Kashyap	24,176	15.15	
BSP	Manoj Kumar Singh	3,945	2.47	+1.08
Bhartiya Sablog Party	Mritunjay Kumar	2,903	1.82	
Independent	Sijantri Kumari	2,026	1.27	
Independent	Sanjay Kumar	1,822	1.14	
JAP(L)	Sultan Amhad	1,809	1.13	+0.09
NOTA	None of the above	2,388	1.5	−2.26
Majority		33,902	21.25	+1.07
Turnout		159,548	53.47	−1.72
RJD hold		Swing		

=== 2015 ===
2015 Bihar Legislative Assembly election: Jehanabad
Party	Candidate	Votes	%	±%
RJD	Mundrika Singh Yadav	76,458	50.87	
RLSP	Praveen Kumar	46,137	30.69	
CPI(ML)L	Santosh Keshari	6,716	4.47	
Independent	Gopal Sharma	3,065	2.04	
Independent	Bajrangi Yadav	2,171	1.44	
BSP	Arvind Kumar Ray	2,084	1.39	
SS	Sanjay Kumar	1,906	1.27	
Independent	Manish Kumar Mishra	1,597	1.06	
JAP(L)	Ejaz Ahamd	1,566	1.04	
NOTA	None of the above	5,648	3.76	
Majority		30,321	20.18	
Turnout		150,314	55.19	
