= Suchitra Sinha =

Indian politician

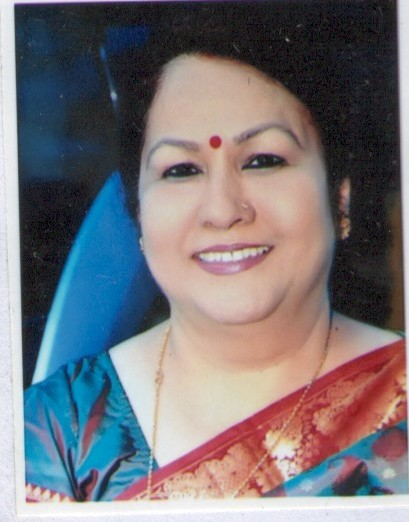

Member of Bihar Legislative Assembly
- In office 2005–2010
- Preceded by: Shivbachan Yadav
- Succeeded by: Satyadev Kushwaha
- Constituency: Kurtha

Minister for Food and Consumer Conservation, Government of Bihar
- In office 2005–2008

Personal details
- Spouse: Nagmani

Suchitra Sinha is an Indian politician and a former member of Bihar Legislative Assembly from Kurtha Assembly constituency. Sinha was elected to Bihar Legislative Assembly in 2005 on the symbol of Lok Janshakti Party. In the re-election conducted same year, she was again elected, but this time on the symbol of Janata Dal (United). She has also served as a minister in Government of Bihar. Sinha belongs to a political family of Bihar. Her father, Satish Prasad Singh was a former Chief Minister of Bihar and her father-in-law Jagdeo Prasad was a former Deputy Chief Minister for a short term in Satish Prasad Singh ministry. Sinha was the Minister for Food and Consumer Conservation in Nitish Kumar government from 2005 to 2008.

== Political career ==
Sinha stepped in politics in the year 2005. In the February 2005 Bihar Legislative Assembly elections, she contested on the symbol of Lok Janshakti Party. She was victorious but political situation in state of Bihar in 2005 resulted in a re-election in the month of October the same year. Sinha got the symbol of Janata Dal (United) and retained the Kurtha Assembly constituency once again. She was made a minister in Government of Bihar and was allowed to continue in this office till 2008. It is opined by political analysts of the Bihar that it was her husband Nagmani, who directed her political career. In 2008, Nagmani let her resign from the ministerial berth and replaced her as minister in Nitish Kumar government. It is believed that he wanted her to contest the Lok Sabha elections. In the meantime Janata Dal United denied her their symbol for the Lok Sabha polls and Nagmani resigned from the JDU. Sinha continued to remain the member of JDU till the end of her term in 2010.

When Nagmani founded his Samras Samaj Party, Sinha was made the president of women wing of the party. Before 2015 Bihar Legislative Assembly elections, Sinha was a part of Nagmani's party (Samras Samaj Party) and a member of third front, a coalition of political parties like Samajwadi Party and Jan Adhikar Party (Loktantrik), having minimal presence in the state. After Nagmani's Samras Samaj Party quit the third front and announced its support to Grand Alliance of Janata Dal (United) and Rashtriya Janata Dal, Sinha was fielded as the candidate of Samras Samaj Party from Morwa Assembly constituency of Samastipur district. She suffered defeat in the 2015 Assembly elections.

She again contested in 2020 Bihar Legislative Assembly elections from the Kurtha Assembly constituency, which has been a traditional seat of her family, represented earlier by her father-in-law and husband. This time she contested on the symbol of Bharatiya Sab Log Party. She, however, lost to Bagi Kumar Verma of Rashtriya Janata Dal.

== See also ==
- Suryadev Singh
