= Maniyawan =

Maniyawan is a place in the Jehanabad district in Bihar state of India. It is situated at a distance of approximately 7 kilometers from Jehanabad.

Notable people from Maniyawan include Arun Kumar.
