= Upendra Nath Verma =

Indian politician and independence activist

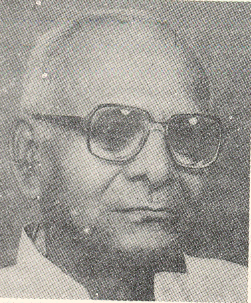

Member of Parliament, Lok Sabha
- In office 1989–1996
- Preceded by: Ranjit Singh
- Succeeded by: Dhirendra Agarwal
- Constituency: Chatra, Bihar

Minister of Land Reforms and Revenue, Government of Bihar
- In office 1977–80

Minister of state for Rural Development, Government of India
- In office 1989–90

Minister for Education, Government of Bihar
- In office 1967–68

Personal details
- Party: Janata Dal
- Other political affiliations: Samyukta Socialist Party
- Children: Bagi Kumar Verma (son)

Upendra Nath Verma, known with the honorific "Lokratna", is an Indian politician from Bihar. He was elected to the lower House of the Indian Parliament, the Lok Sabha from Chatra, [Bihar, as a member of the Janata Dal. He was the Union Minister for State, Rural Development in 1989–90 in the cabinet of Vishwanath Pratap Singh. Verma was a distinguished social reformer and author, who published numerous works on the social issues prevalent in Indian society. In his political career, he was associated with Samyukta Socialist Party besides Janata Dal and has served as Minister of Education and Revenue in Government of Bihar in 1967 and 1977 respectively.

== Life and political career ==
Verma was a member of legislative assembly in Bihar and was considered as an influential leader of Koeris in the Magadh region. Prior to his entry into active politics, he was a teacher by profession. Verma was a social reformer and freedom fighter as well. He is known for active participation in Indian Independence movement. Having served as minister in both Government of Bihar and Government of India, he is known for his work in the education sector. As state minister for education in Government of Bihar, Verma led establishment of 22 High Schools and 2 colleges. He also served as minister for land reforms and revenue. His second son Bagi Kumar Verma is a member of Bihar Legislative Assembly from Kurtha Assembly constituency. His daughter in law, Kumud Verma has served as member of Bihar Legislative Council (Kumud is wife of his third son Abhijat Verma).

Verma was born on 23 August 1921, in Mukhdumpur bloc of Gaya district. The name of his village is Imanbigha. He was a socialist leader and considered as one of the pillars of socialism in the state of Bihar. He, along with Karpoori Thakur, Basawon Singh and others were instrumental in fighting against the feudalism in the state of Bihar. He won his first election from Konch Assembly constituency in 1967, and was appointed as state minister for education in first non-congress government in Bihar. In 1977, he was made revenue minister in Government of Bihar. In 1989 and 1991 General Elections, he won from Chatra constituency and subsequently appointed to Rural Development ministry in the cabinet of V.P Singh. Verma has served as state president of Samyukta Socialist Party for 9 terms, for the state of Bihar.

In 1977, he was elected to Bihar Legislative Assembly from Gurua Assembly constituency, as a candidate of Janata Party. He was also appointed as president of "Bihar State Farmers Commission" by Nitish Kumar, the post, which he held till his death.

Verma also played important role in bringing Bhagwati Devi into active politics. In 1960s, Devi, who belonged to rat-eater Musahar caste, used to work as casual labourer as stone crusher. On one such occasion, while she was breaking the stones with rural women and discussing about the rights of women with other labourers, she was spotted by Verma. Verma informed Ram Manohar Lohia about her, and in 1969, Lohia granted her ticket to contest state assembly elections as a candidate of Samyukta Socialist Party. Thus, in 1969, Devi became a member of Bihar Legislative Assembly.

== Writings ==
Verma also established himself as writer, his works were primarily in Hindi language and dealt with social issues. He authored "Anna Sankat", "Khet Mazdooron Ka Sawat", "Bihar Mein Savinaya Awagya", "Bihar Mein Madhyavadhi Chunav", "Cheeni Hamle Ka Mukabila", "Apani Lathi Apana Raj" in Hindi. Besides this, he was also the editor of 'Mook Awaj', a Hindi Weekly published from Gaya since 1980.

== Legacy ==
To commemorate his work in field of education, several colleges are established in various parts of Bihar and Jharkhand. In Gaya, Bihar, Upendera Nath Verma Inter college has been established, which is named after him.

== See also ==
- Sukhdeo Prasad Verma
