= 1995 Bihar Legislative Assembly election =

Election in India

1995 Bihar Legislative assembly election
- 25 and 28 March 1995

All 324 seats of the Bihar Legislative Assembly 163 seats needed for a majority
- Turnout: 61.79%
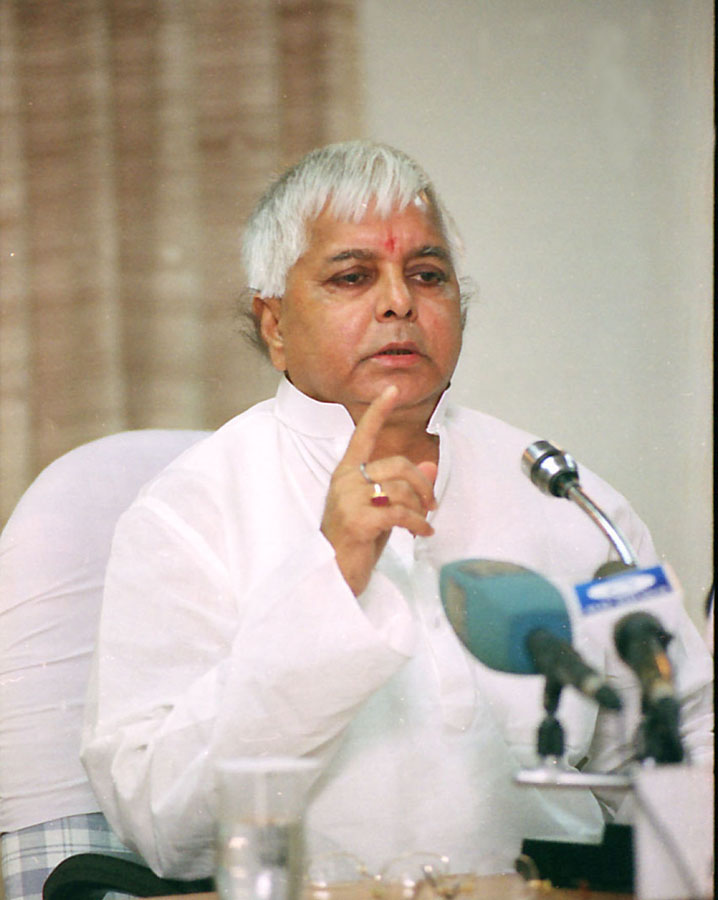

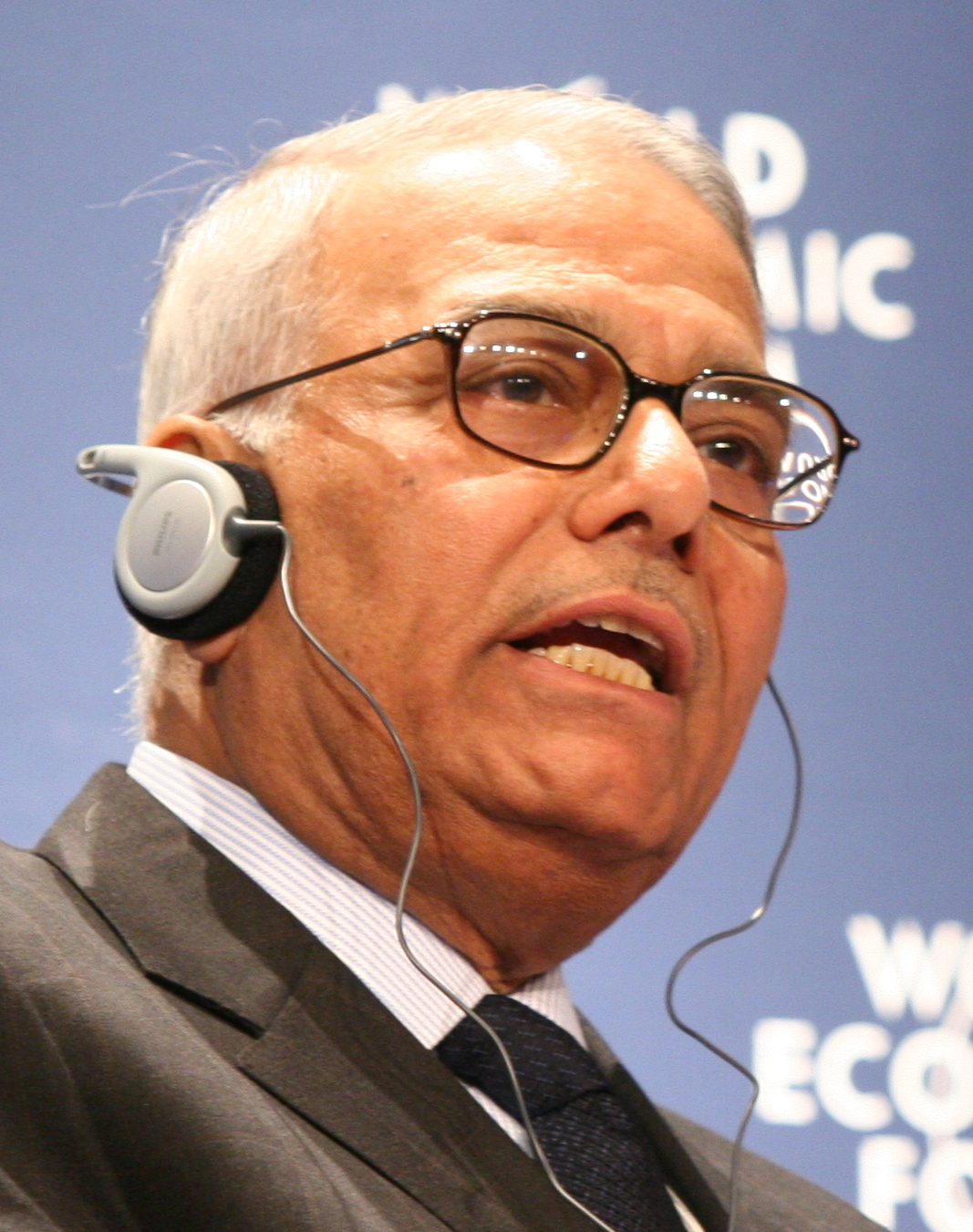

	Majority party	Minority party
Leader	Lalu Prasad Yadav	Yashwant Sinha
Party	JD	BJP
Leader since	1990	1995
Leader's seat	Raghopur (retained), Danapur	Ranchi
Last election	122	39
Seats won	167	41
Seat change	▲45	▲2
Popular vote	9,669,589	4,480,363
Percentage	27.98%	12.96%
Swing	▲2.37%	▲1.35%
	Third party	Fourth party
		CPI
Leader	Jagannath Mishra	Indrajit Gupta
Party	INC	CPI
Leader since	1989	1990
Leader's seat	Did not contest	Did not contest
Last election	71	23
Seats won	29	26
Seat change	▼42	▲3
Popular vote	5,622,952	1,645,765
Percentage	16.27%	4.76%
Swing	▼8.51%	▼1.83%
CM before election
Lalu Prasad
JD
Elected CM
Lalu Prasad
JD

The 11th Bihar Legislative Assembly elections were held in March 1995, to elect the 324 members of the Bihar Legislative Assembly. Janata Dal got a decisive victory in the state; political manoeuvre ensured Lalu Prasad Yadav's victory in the chief ministership. According to political scientist Sanjay Kumar, this election set a different trend in caste based politics of the state of Bihar, as in this election, there were two main political blocs in the state contesting for power. The either side of this power struggle was led by Backward Castes. It was the election in which the Forward Castes were pushed to margins in the politics of state.

In 1997, due to allegation related to Fodder Scam, a leadership revolt surfaced in Janata Dal, consequently Lalu broke away from Janata Dal and formed a new political party Rashtriya Janata Dal (RJD). He handed over the reins of Bihar to his wife Rabri Devi to ensure his de facto rule, who won the trust vote with support from Rashtriya Janata Dal (136), the Congress (28), the Jharkhand Mukti Morcha (S), the Jharkhand Mukti Morcha (M), the Jharkhand People's Party (20) and independents (10).

== Results ==
Source: ECI
Party	Party Flag	Candidates	Seats	Seats Change	Vote Share
Janata Dal		264	167	(+) 45	28.0
Bharatiya Janata Party		315	41	(+) 2	13.0
Indian National Congress		320	29	(−) 42	16.3
Communist Party of India		61	26	(+) 3	4.8
Independent		5674	11	(−) 19	13.8
Jharkhand Mukti Morcha		63	10	(−) 8	2.3
Samata Party		310	7	(+) 7	7.1
Communist Party of India (Marxist–Leninist)		89	6	(+) 6	2.4
Communist Party of India (Marxist)		31	2	(−) 4	1.4
Jharkhand Mukti Morcha		22	6	(+) 6	
JMM (Marandi)		58	3	(+) 3	1.0
Samajwadi Party		176	2	(+) 2	1.7
Marxist Co-ordination Committee		5	2	(+) 0	0.3
Bahujan Samaj Party		161	2	(+) 2	1.3
Jharkhand People's Party		33	2	(+) 2	0.3
Champaran Vikas Party		15	1	(+) 1	0.3
Jharkhand Party		29	1	(+) 1	0.2
Bhartiya Pragatisheel Party		259	1	(+) 1	3.0

=== District wise results ===
District	Seats								
District	Seats	JND	BJP	INC	CPI	JMM	SAP	IND	OTH
Araria	6	2	1	1	0	0	0	0	2
Arwal	2	2	0	0	0	0	0	0	0
Aurangabad	6	2	1	0	2	0	0	0	1
Banka	5	4	0	0	1	0	0	0	0
Begusarai	7	2	0	0	4	0	0	0	1
Bhagalpur	7	5	1	0	1	0	0	0	0
Bhojpur	7	5	0	0	0	0	0	0	2
Buxar	4	2	0	0	1	0	0	0	1
Darbhanga	9	7	1	0	1	0	0	0	0
East Champaran	11	7	1	0	1	0	1	1	0
Gaya	10	6	1	0	0	0	1	2	0
Gopalganj	6	5	0	0	0	0	0	0	1
Jamui	4	1	1	1	1	0	0	0	0
Jehanabad	3	2	0	1	0	0	0	0	0
Kaimur	4	1	0	0	1	0	0	0	2
Katihar	7	3	3	1	0	0	0	0	0
Khagaria	4	2	1	0	1	0	0	0	0
Kishanganj	3	0	2	1	0	0	0	0	0
Lakhisarai	2	1	0	0	0	0	0	1	0
Madhepura	5	5	0	0	0	0	0	0	0
Madhubani	11	5	0	1	4	0	0	1	0
Munger	4	3	0	0	0	0	1	0	0
Muzaffarpur	11	11	0	0	0	0	0	0	0
Nalanda	9	2	1	1	1	0	3	1	0
Nawada	5	2	0	2	0	0	0	1	0
Patna	13	9	3	0	1	0	0	0	0
Purnia	7	2	1	1	1	0	0	0	2
Rohtas	7	6	1	0	0	0	0	0	0
Saharsa	4	3	0	1	0	0	0	0	0
Samastipur	10	9	0	0	0	0	0	0	1
Saran	10	8	0	1	1	0	0	0	0
Sheikhpura	1	0	0	1	0	0	0	0	0
Sheohar	1	1	0	0	0	0	0	0	0
Sitamarhi	8	7	1	0	0	0	0	0	0
Siwan	8	6	0	0	0	0	0	0	2
Supaul	5	3	0	2	0	0	0	0	0
Vaishali	8	8	0	0	0	0	0	0	0
West Champaran	9	5	0	0	1	0	1	1	1
Bokaro	4	1	1	1	0	0	0	1	0
Chatra	2	1	1	0	0	0	0	0	0
Deoghar	3	1	0	1	0	1	0	0	0
Dhanbad	6	1	1	1	0	1	0	0	2
Dumka	6	0	0	1	1	4	0	0	0
East Singhbhum	6	0	2	1	1	2	0	0	0
Garhwa	2	2	0	0	0	0	0	0	0
Giridih	6	1	3	0	0	1	0	0	1
Godda	3	0	0	2	0	1	0	0	0
Gumla	3	0	0	2	0	1	0	0	0
Hazaribagh	4	0	2	1	0	1	0	0	0
Koderma	1	1	0	0	0	0	0	0	0
Latehar	2	2	0	0	0	0	0	0	0
Lohardaga	1	0	1	0	0	0	0	0	0
Pakur	3	0	1	0	0	1	0	0	1
Palamu	5	3	0	1	0	0	0	1	0
Ramgarh	2	0	2	0	0	0	0	0	0
Ranchi	9	0	4	3	0	1	0	0	1
Sahebganj	3	0	1	0	0	1	0	1	0
Seraikela Kharsawan	3	0	0	0	0	2	0	1	0
Simdega	2	0	0	0	0	2	0	0	0
West Singhbhum	5	1	2	0	0	0	0	0	2
Total	324	168	41	29	25	19	7	12	23

== Elected members ==
Constituency		Winner			Runner Up			Margin
#	Name	Candidate	Party	Votes	Candidate	Party	Votes	Margin
West Champaran district
1	Dhanaha	Vishnu Prasad Kushwaha	SAP	13206	Satan Yadav	Ind	10100	3106
2	Bagaha (SC)	Purnmasi Ram	JD	61201	Kailash Baitha	SAP	21422	39779
3	Ramnagar	Ram Prasad Yadav	JD	25554	Chandra Mohan Rai	BJP	12871	12683
4	Shikarpur (SC)	Bhola Ram Toofani	JD	33792	Subodh Kumar	BJP	20698	13094
5	Sikta	Dilip Varma	CVP	50867	Faiyazul Azam	JD	32009	18858
6	Lauriya	Ranvijay Shahi	JD	38778	Vishwa Mohan Sharma	INC	32382	6396
7	Chanpatia	Birbal Sharma	CPI	31858	Bharat Rai	INC	15819	16039
8	Bettiah	Birval Yadav	JD	38861	Madan Prasad Jaiswal	BJP	38356	505
9	Nautan	Satan Yadav	Ind	38387	Baidyanath Prasad Mahto	SAP	11435	26952
East Champaran district
10	Raxaul	Rajnandan Rai	JD	24255	Ajay Kumar Singh	BJP	16815	7440
11	Sugauli	Chandrashekhar Dwivedi	Ind	22492	Ramashray Singh	CPM	18552	3940
12	Motihari	Triveni Tiwary	JD	52684	Laxman Prasad	BJP	33498	19186
13	Adapur	Brij Behari Prasad	JD	51036	Virendra Prasad	Ind	18971	32065
14	Dhaka	Avaneesh Kumar Singh	BJP	49520	Motiur Rahman	INC	24356	25164
15	Ghorasahan	Lal Babu Prasad	JD	32112	Raj Kumar Prasad	INC	12245	19867
16	Madhuban	Sitaram Singh	JD	47614	Krishna Chandra	SAP	18705	28909
17	Pipra (SC)	Sahdeo Paswan	JD	46700	Nandlal Chaudhury	INC	11907	34793
18	Kesaria	Yamuna Yadav	CPI	52003	Kiran Shukla	BPP	26799	25204
19	Harsidhi	Awadhesh Kushwaha	JD	56262	Maheshwar Singh	SAP	24424	31838
20	Govindganj	Devendra Nath Dubey	SAP	41128	Yogendra Pandey	JD	27273	13855

== Winners ==
Constituency	Reserved for (SC/ST/None)	Member	Party
Kateya	None	Sinheshwar Shahi	Janata Dal
Bhore	SC	Indradeo Manjhi	Janata Dal
Mirganj	None	Vishwanath Singh	Communist Party of India
Gopalganj	None	Ramawtar	Janata Dal
Barauli	None	M.nemtullah	Janata Dal
Baikunthpur	None	Lalbabu Prasad Yadav	Janata Dal
Basantpur	None	Manikchand Rai	Janata Dal
Goreakothi	None	Indra Dev Prasad	Janata Dal
Siwan	None	Awadh Bihari Choudhary	Janata Dal
Mairwa	SC	Satyadeo Ram	Communist Party of India (Marxist-Leninist)
Darauli	None	Amar Nath Yadav	Communist Party of India (Marxist-Leninist)
Ziradei	None	M. Sahabuddin	Janata Dal
Maharajganj	None	Baidya Nath Pande	Janata Dal
Raghunathpur	None	Bikram Kuwar	Janata Dal
Manjhi	None	Budhan Prasad Yadav	Indian National Congress
Baniapur	None	Ram Bahadur Rai	Janata Dal
Masrakh	None	Ashok Singh	Janata Dal
Taraiya	None	Ram Das Rai	Janata Dal
Marhaura	None	Yaduvanshi Rai	Janata Dal
Jalalpur	None	Abhay Raj Kishore	Communist Party of India
Chapra	None	Udit Rai	Janata Dal
Garkha	SC	Muneshwar Chaudhari	Janata Dal
Parsa	None	Chandrika Roy	Janata Dal
Sonepur	None	Raj Kumar Rai	Janata Dal
Hajipur	None	Rajendra Rai	Janata Dal
Raghopur	None	Lalu Prasad Yadav	Janata Dal
Mahnar	None	Munshi Lal Ray	Janata Dal
Jandaha	None	Tulsidas Mehta	Janata Dal
Patepur	SC	Mahendra Baitha	Janata Dal
Mahua	SC	Munshi Lal Paswan	Janata Dal
Lalganj	None	Yogendra Pd. Sahu	Janata Dal
Vaishali	None	Raj Kishore Sinha	Janata Dal
Paru	None	Mithilesh Prasad Yadav	Janata Dal
Sahebganj	None	Ram Vichar Ray	Janata Dal
Baruraj	None	Shashi Kumar Rai	Janata Dal
Kanti	None	Mufti Mohammad Quasim	Janata Dal
Kurhani	None	Basawan Prasad Bhagat	Janata Dal
Sakra	SC	Kamal Paswan	Janata Dal
Muzaffarpur	None	Vijendra Chaudhary	Janata Dal
Bochaha	SC	Ramai Ram	Janata Dal
Gaighatti	None	Maheshwar Prasad Yadav	Janata Dal
Aurai	None	Ganesh Prasad Yadav	Janata Dal
Minapur	None	Hind Keshri Yadav	Janata Dal
Runisaidpur	None	Bhola Ray	Janata Dal
Belsand	None	Raghubansh Prasad Singh	Janata Dal
Sheohar	None	Raghunath Jha	Janata Dal
Sitamarhi	None	Hari Shankar Prasad	Bharatiya Janata Party
Bathnaha	None	Suryadev Rai	Janata Dal
Majorganj	SC	Surender Ram	Janata Dal
Sonbarsa	None	Ramjiwan Prasad	Janata Dal
Sursand	None	Nagendra Prasad Yadav	Janata Dal
Pupri	None	Sitaram Yadav	Janata Dal
Benipatti	None	Shaligram Yadav	Independent
Bisfi	None	Ramchandra Yadav	Communist Party of India
Harlakhi	None	Ram Naresh Pande	Communist Party of India
Khajauli	SC	Ram Lashan Ram "raman"	Communist Party of India
Babubarhi	None	Deo Narayan Yadav	Janata Dal
Madhubani	None	Raj Kumar Mahaseth	Janata Dal
Pandaul	None	Naiyar Azam	Janata Dal
Jhanjharpur	None	Ramawtar Chaudhary	Janata Dal
Phulparas	None	Deo Nath Yadav	Indian National Congress
Laukaha	None	Lal Bihari Yadav	Communist Party of India
Madhepur	None	Rup Narayan Jha	Janata Dal
Manigachhi	None	Lalit Kumar Yadav	Janata Dal
Bahera	None	Abdul Bari Siddiqui	Janata Dal
Ghanshyampur	None	Mahabir Prasad	Janata Dal
Baheri	None	Ram Lakhan Yadav	Janata Dal
Darbhanga Rural	SC	Mohan Ram	Janata Dal
Darbhanga	None	Shiv Nath Verma	Bharatiya Janata Party
Keoti	None	Gulam Sarvar	Janata Dal
Jale	None	Abdul Salam	Communist Party of India
Hayaghat	None	Hari Nandan Yadav	Janata Dal
Kalyanpur	None	Sita Sinha	Janata Dal
Warisnagar	SC	Pitamber Paswan	Janata Dal
Samastipur	None	Ashok Singh	Janata Dal
Sarairanjan	None	Ram Ashray Sahni	Janata Dal
Mohiuddin Nagar	None	Ram Chander Rai	Janata Dal
Dalsinghsarai	None	Ram Lakhan Mahato	Janata Dal
Bibhutpur	None	Ramdeo Verma	Communist Party of India
Rosera	SC	Gajendra Prasad Singh	Janata Dal
Singhia	None	Jagdish Paswan	Janata Dal
Hasanpur	None	Sunil Kumar Pushpam	Janata Dal
Balia	None	Srinarayan Yadav	Janata Dal
Matihani	None	Rajendra Rajan	Communist Party of India
Begusarai	None	Rajendra Pd. Singh	Communist Party of India
Barauni	None	Rajendra Prasad Singh	Communist Party of India
Bachwara	None	Abdhesh Kumar Roy	Communist Party of India
Cheria Bariarpur	None	Ram Jeewan Singh	Janata Dal
Bakhri	SC	Ram Binod Paswan	Communist Party of India
Raghopur	None	Lakhan Thakur	Janata Dal
Kishunpur	None	Vijay Kumar Gupta	Indian National Congress
Supaul	None	Bijendra Prasad Yadav	Janata Dal
Tribeniganj	None	Vishwa Mohan Kumar	Indian National Congress
Chhatapur	SC	Bishwa Mohan Bharti	Janata Dal
Kumarkhand	SC	Upendra Nr. Hazra	Janata Dal
Singheshwar	None	Bam Bhola Yadav	Janata Dal
Saharsa	None	Shankar Prasad Tekriwal	Janata Dal
Mahishi	None	Abdul Gafoor	Janata Dal
Simri-bakhtiarpur	None	Choudhary Md. Mehboob Ali Kaiser	Indian National Congress
Madhepura	None	Parmeshwari Pd. Nirala	Janata Dal
Sonbarsa	None	Ashok Kumar Singh	Janata Dal
Kishanganj	None	Rabindra Charan Yadav	Janata Dal
Alamnagar	None	Narendra Narayan Yadav	Janata Dal
Rupauli	None	Bal Kishor Mandal	Communist Party of India
Dhamdaha	None	Dilip Kumar Yadav	Janata Dal
Banmankhi	SC	Chunni Lal Rajbanshi	Janata Dal
Raniganj	SC	Shanti Devi	Janata Dal
Narpatganj	None	Daya Nand Yadav	Janata Dal
Forbesganj	None	Mayanand Thakur	Bharatiya Janata Party
Araria	None	Vijay Kumar Mandal	Bharatiya Pragatisheel Party
Sikti	None	Rameshwar Yadav	Indian National Congress
Jokihat	None	Taslimuddin	Samajwadi Party
Bahadurganj	None	Awadh Bihari Singh	Bharatiya Janata Party
Thakurganj	None	Sikander Singh	Bharatiya Janata Party
Kishanganj	None	Rafique Alam	Indian National Congress
Amour	None	Muzaffar Hussain	Samajwadi Party
Baisi	None	Syed Moinuddin	Indian National Congress
Kasba	None	Pradip Ku. Das	Bharatiya Janata Party
Purnea	None	Ajit Sarkar	Communist Party of India
Korha	SC	Sitaram Das	Janata Dal
Barari	None	Mansoor Alam	Janata Dal
Katihar	None	Jagbandhu Adhikari	Bharatiya Janata Party
Kadwa	None	Bhola Rai	Bharatiya Janata Party
Barsoi	None	Dulal Chandra Goswami	Bharatiya Janata Party
Pranpur	None	Mahendra Narayan Yadav	Janata Dal
Manihari	None	Mubarak Hussain	Indian National Congress
Rajmahal	None	Drub Bhagat	Bharatiya Janata Party
Borio	ST	Lobin Hembrom	Independent
Barhait	ST	Hemlal Murmu	Jharkhand Mukti Morcha
Litipara	ST	Sushila Hasda	Jharkhand Mukti Morcha
Pakaur	None	Beni Prasad Gupta	Bharatiya Janata Party
Maheshpur	ST	Jyotin Soren	Communist Party of India
Sikaripara	ST	Nalin Soren	Jharkhand Mukti Morcha
Nala	None	Bisheshwar Khan	Communist Party of India
Jamtara	None	Furkan Ansari	Indian National Congress
Sarath	None	Uday Shankar Singh	Indian National Congress
Madhupur	None	Hussain Ansari	Jharkhand Mukti Morcha
Deoghar	SC	Suresh Paswan	Janata Dal
Jarmundi	None	Devendra Kunwar	Jharkhand Mukti Morcha
Dumka	ST	Stefan Marandi	Jharkhand Mukti Morcha
Jama	ST	Durga Soren	Jharkhand Mukti Morcha
Poreyahat	None	Prashant Kumar	Jharkhand Mukti Morcha
Godda	None	Rajnish Anand	Indian National Congress
Mahagama	None	Awadh Bihari Singh	Indian National Congress
Pirpainti	None	Ambika Prasad	Communist Party of India
Colgong	None	Mahesh Prasad Mandal	Janata Dal
Nathnagar	None	Lutfar Rahman	Janata Dal
Bhagalpur	None	Ashwini Choube	Bharatiya Janata Party
Gopalpur	None	Rabindra Kr. Rana	Janata Dal
Bihpur	None	Barhmdeo Mandal	Janata Dal
Sultanganj	SC	Fanindra Choudhary	Janata Dal
Amarpur	None	Surendra Prasad Singh Kushwaha	Janata Dal
Dhuraiya	SC	Naresh Das	Communist Party of India
Banka	None	Javed Iqbal Ansari	Janata Dal
Belhar	None	Ramdeo Yadav	Janata Dal
Katoria	None	Giridhari Yadav	Janata Dal
Chakai	None	Phalguni Prasad Yadav	Bharatiya Janata Party
Jhajha	None	Ravindra Yadav	Indian National Congress
Tarapur	None	Shakuni Choudhary	Samata Party
Kharagpur	None	Jay Prakash Narayan Yadav	Janata Dal
Parbatta	None	Vidya Sagar Nishad	Janata Dal
Chautham	None	Satya Narayan Singh	Communist Party of India
Khagaria	None	Chandramukhi Devi	Bharatiya Janata Party
Alauli	SC	Pashupati Kumar Paras	Janata Dal
Monghyr	None	Monazir Hasan	Janata Dal
Jamalpur	None	Upendra Pd. Verma	Janata Dal
Surajgarha	None	Prahlad Yadav	Independent
Jamui	None	Arjun Mandal	Janata Dal
Sikandra	SC	Prayag Choudhary	Communist Party of India
Lakhisarai	None	Yaduvansh Singh	Janata Dal
Sheikhpura	None	Rajo Singh	Indian National Congress
Barbigha	SC	Mahavir Chaudhary	Indian National Congress
Asthawan	None	Satish Kumar	Independent
Biharsharif	None	Deo Nath Prasad	Janata Dal
Rajgir	SC	Satyadeo Narayan Arya	Bharatiya Janata Party
Nalanda	None	Shrawon Kumar	Samata Party
Islampur	None	Krishna Ballabh Prasad	Communist Party of India
Hilsa	None	Vaiju Prasad	Janata Dal
Chandi	None	Anil Singh	Samata Party
Harnaut	None	Nitish Kumar	Samata Party
Mokameh	None	Dilip Kumar Singh	Janata Dal
Barh	None	Vijay Krishna	Janata Dal
Bakhtiarpur	None	Brajnandan Yadav	Janata Dal
Fatwa	SC	Punit Rai	Janata Dal
Masaurhi	None	Ganesh Prasad Singh	Janata Dal
Patna West	None	Navin Kishore Prasad Sinha	Bharatiya Janata Party
Patna Central	None	Sushil Kumar Modi	Bharatiya Janata Party
Patna East	None	Nand Kishore Yadav	Bharatiya Janata Party
Danapur	None	Lalu Prasad Yadav	Janata Dal
Maner	None	Srikant Nirala	Janata Dal
Phulwari	SC	Shyam Rajak	Janata Dal
Bikram	None	Ram Nath Yadav	Communist Party of India
Paliganj	None	Chandradeo Prasad Verma	Janata Dal
Sandesh	None	Rameshwar Prasad	Communist Party of India (Marxist-Leninist)
Barhara	None	Raghwendra Pratap Singh	Janata Dal
Arrah	None	Abdul Malik	Janata Dal
Shahpur	None	Dharampal Singh	Janata Dal
Brahmpur	None	Ajit Choudhary	Janata Dal
Buxar	None	Manju Prakash	Communist Party of India
Rajpur	SC	Arjoon Ram	Communist Party of India
Dumraon	None	Basant Singh	Janata Dal
Jagdishpur	None	Hari Narain Singh	Janata Dal
Piro	None	Kanti Singh	Janata Dal
Sahar	SC	Parasnath	Communist Party of India (Marxist-Leninist)
Karakat	None	Tulsi Singh Yadav	Janata Dal
Bikramganj	None	Dr. Surya Deo Singh	Janata Dal
Dinara	None	Ram Dhani Singh	Janata Dal
Ramgarh	None	Jagda Nand Singh	Janata Dal
Mohania	SC	Suresh Pasi	Bahujan Samaj Party
Bhabhua	None	Ram Lal Singh	Communist Party of India
Chainpur	None	Mahabali Singh	Bahujan Samaj Party
Sasaram	None	Jawahar Prasad	Bharatiya Janata Party
Chenari	SC	Jawahar Paswan	Janata Dal
Nokha	None	Anand Mohan Singh	Janata Dal
Dehri	None	Md. Ilyas Hussain	Janata Dal
Nabinagar	None	Virendra Kumar Singh	Janata Dal
Deo	SC	Suresh Paswan	Janata Dal
Aurangabad	None	Ramadhar Singh	Bharatiya Janata Party
Rafiganj	None	Ram Chandra Singh	Communist Party of India
Obra	None	Raja Ram Singh	Communist Party of India (Marxist-Leninist)
Goh	None	Ram Sharan Yadav	Communist Party of India
Arwal	None	Ravindra Singh	Janata Dal
Kurtha	None	Sahdev Prasad Yadav	Janata Dal
Makhdumpur	None	Bagi Kumar Verma	Janata Dal
Jahanabad	None	Mudrika Singh Yadav	Janata Dal
Ghosi	None	Jagdish Sharma	Indian National Congress
Belaganj	None	Surendra Prasad Yadav	Janata Dal
Konch	None	Shiv Bachan Yadav	Janata Dal
Gaya Mufassil	None	Vinod Kumar Yadvindu	Janata Dal
Gaya Town	None	Prem Kumar	Bharatiya Janata Party
Imamganj	SC	Ramswaroop Paswan	Samata Party
Gurua	None	Ramchandra Singh	Independent
Bodh Gaya	SC	Malti Devi	Independent
Barachatti	SC	Bhagwati Devi	Janata Dal
Fatehpur	SC	Ram Naresh Prasad	Janata Dal
Atri	None	Rajender Prasad Yadav	Janata Dal
Nawada	None	Raj Ballabh Yadav	Independent
Rajauli	SC	Babu Lal	Janata Dal
Gobindpur	None	K.b. Prasad	Janata Dal
Warsaliganj	None	Ramashray Prasad Singh	Indian National Congress
Hisua	None	Aditya Singh	Indian National Congress
Kodarma	None	Ramesh Prasad Yadav	Janata Dal
Barhi	None	Manoj Yadav	Indian National Congress
Chatra	SC	Janardan Paswan	Janata Dal
Simaria	SC	Upendra Nath Das	Bharatiya Janata Party
Barkagaon	None	Loknath Mahto	Bharatiya Janata Party
Ramgarh	None	Shankar Choudhary	Bharatiya Janata Party
Mandu	None	Teklal Mahto	Jharkhand Mukti Morcha
Hazaribagh	None	Deo Dayal	Bharatiya Janata Party
Barkatha	None	Khagendra Prasad	Bharatiya Janata Party
Dhanwar	None	Guru Sahay Mahto	Janata Dal
Bagodar	None	Mahendra Prasad Singh	Communist Party of India (Marxist-Leninist)
Jamua	SC	Sukar Rabidas	Bharatiya Janata Party
Gandey	None	Laxman Swarnkar	Bharatiya Janata Party
Giridih	None	Chandra Mohan Prasad	Bharatiya Janata Party
Dumri	None	Shiva Mahto	Jharkhand Mukti Morcha
Gomia	None	Chhatru Ram Mahto	Bharatiya Janata Party
Bermo	None	Rajendra Prasad Singh	Indian National Congress
Bokaro	None	Aklu Ram Mahto	Janata Dal
Tundi	None	Saba Ahmad	Jharkhand Mukti Morcha
Baghmara	None	Om Prakash Lal	Indian National Congress
Sindri	None	Anand Mahto	Marxist Co-ordination Committee
Nirsa	None	Gurudas Chatterji	Marxist Co-ordination Committee
Dhanbad	None	Pasupatinath Singh	Bharatiya Janata Party
Jharia	None	Abo Devi	Janata Dal
Chandankiyari	SC	Gaur Harijan	Independent
Baharagora	None	Devipada Upadhayay	Communist Party of India
Ghatsila	ST	Pradeep Kumar Balmuchu	Indian National Congress
Potka	ST	Hari Ram Sardar	Jharkhand Mukti Morcha
Jugsalai	SC	Dulal Bhuiyan	Jharkhand Mukti Morcha
Jamshedpur East	None	Raghubar Das	Bharatiya Janata Party
Jamshedpur West	None	Mrigendra Pratap Singh	Bharatiya Janata Party
Ichagarh	None	Arvind Kumar Singh	Independent
Seraikella	ST	Champai Soren	Jharkhand Mukti Morcha
Chaibasa	ST	Jawaharlal Banra	Bharatiya Janata Party
Majhgaon	ST	Gobardhan Nayak	Janata Dal
Jaganathpur	ST	Mangal Singh Bobonga	Jammu and Kashmir Panthers Party
Manoharpur	ST	Joba Majhi	Jammu and Kashmir Panthers Party
Chakradharpur	ST	Laxman Giluwa	Bharatiya Janata Party
Kharasawan	ST	Arjun Munda	Jharkhand Mukti Morcha
Tamar	ST	Kali Charan Munda	Indian National Congress
Torpa	ST	N.e. Horo	All India Jharkhand Party
Khunti	ST	Sushila Kerketta	Indian National Congress
Silli	None	Keshavmahto Kamlesh	Indian National Congress
Khijri	ST	Duti Pahan	Bharatiya Janata Party
Ranchi	None	Yashwant Sinha	Bharatiya Janata Party
Hatia	None	Ramji Lal Sharda	Bharatiya Janata Party
Kanke	SC	Ram Chandra Baitha	Bharatiya Janata Party
Mandar	ST	Vishwanath Bhagat	Jharkhand Mukti Morcha
Sisai	ST	Bandi Oraon	Indian National Congress
Kolebira	ST	Basant Kumar Longa	Jharkhand Mukti Morcha
Simdega	ST	Neil Tirkey	Jharkhand Mukti Morcha
Gumla	ST	Bernard Minj	Jharkhand Mukti Morcha
Bishnupur	ST	Bhukhla Bhagat	Indian National Congress
Lohardaga	ST	Sadhnu Bhagat	Bharatiya Janata Party
Latehar	SC	Baljit Ram	Janata Dal
Manika	ST	Ram Chandra Singh (mongra)	Janata Dal
Panki	None	Sankteshwar Singh	Independent
Daltonganj	None	Inder Singh Namdhari	Janata Dal
Garhwa	None	Girinath Singh	Janata Dal
Bhawanathpur	None	Giriwar Pandey	Janata Dal
Bishrampur	None	Ramchandra Chandravanshi	Janata Dal
Chhatarpur	SC	Radha Krishna Kishore	Indian National Congress
Hussainabad	None	Awadesh Kumar Singh	Janata Dal
