= Ghosi, Bihar Assembly constituency =

Coordinates: 25°10′19″N 85°05′57″E

Ghosi
- Constituency No. - for the Bihar Legislative Assembly

Constituency details
- Country: India
- Region: East India
- State: Bihar
- District: Jehanabad
- Established: 1951
- Total electors: 260,927

Member of Legislative Assembly
- 18th Bihar Legislative Assembly
- Incumbent Rituraj Kumar
- Party: JD(U)
- Alliance: NDA
- Elected year: 2025

Ghosi is one of the 243 assembly constituencies of the Bihar Legislative Assembly. It comes under Jahanabad (Lok Sabha constituency) for parliamentary elections.

== Parts ==
The constituency includes nine panchayats of Kako block, Modanganj block, Ghosi block and Hulasganj block of Jehanabad district.

== Members of the Legislative Assembly ==
Year	Member	Party
1952	Ram Chandra Yadav	Independent politician
1957	Ramashray Prasad Singh	Communist Party of India
1962	Mithileshwar Prasad Singh	Indian National Congress
1967	Ramashray Prasad Singh	Communist Party of India
1969	Kaushlendra Prasad Singh	Indian National Congress
1972	Ramashray Prasad Singh	Communist Party of India
1977	Jagdish Sharma	Janata Party
1980	Jagdish Sharma	Bharatiya Janata Party
1985	Jagdish Sharma	Indian National Congress
1990	Jagdish Sharma	Indian National Congress
1995	Jagdish Sharma	Indian National Congress
2000	Jagdish Sharma	Independent politician
2005	Jagdish Sharma	Independent politician
2005	Jagdish Sharma	Janata Dal (United)
2009^	Shanti Sharma	Independent politician
2010	Rahul Sharma	Janata Dal (United)
2015	Krishna Nandan Prasad Verma	Janata Dal (United)
2020	Ram Bali Singh Yadav	Communist Party of India (Marxist-Leninist) Liberation
2025	Rituraj Kumar	Janata Dal (United)

== Election results ==
=== 2025 ===
Bihar Assembly election, 2025: Ghosi
Party	Candidate	Votes	%	±%
JD(U)	Rituraj Kumar	80,740	47.05	+9.37
CPI(ML)L	Ram Bali Singh Yadav	68,811	40.1	−8.97
BSP	Anuradha Sinha	3,715	2.17	
Independent	Wasif Husnain	3,493	2.04	
Independent	Satyendra Prasad Yadav	3,073	1.79	+0.0
JSP	Prabhat Kumar	3,070	1.79	
Independent	Rajesh Ranjan	1,931	1.13	
SUCI(C)	Indu Kumari	1,842	1.07	
NOTA	None of the above	3,073	1.79	−0.7
Majority		11,929	6.95	−4.44
Turnout		171,592	65.76	+7.74
JD(U) gain from CPI(ML)L		Swing		

=== 2020 ===
Bihar Assembly election, 2020: Ghosi
Party	Candidate	Votes	%	±%
CPI(ML)L	Ram Bali Singh Yadav	74,712	49.07	
JD(U)	Rahul Sharma	57,379	37.68	−9.9
LJP	Rakesh Kumar Singh	4,762	3.13	
Independent	Satyendra Prasad Yadav	2,729	1.79	
Independent	Nityananda	2,328	1.53	
Independent	Arvind Kumar	1,652	1.08	
NOTA	None of the above	3,793	2.49	−1.2
Majority		17,333	11.39	−3.91
Turnout		152,267	58.02	+0.17
CPI(ML)L gain from JD(U)		Swing		

=== 2015 ===
2015 Bihar Legislative Assembly election: Ghosi
Party	Candidate	Votes	%	±%
JD(U)	Krishan Nandan Prasad Verma	67,248	47.58	
HAM(S)	Rahul Kumar	45,623	32.28	
CPI(ML)L	Rambali Yadav	10,894	7.71	
SS	Arvind Kumar Pandey	5,900	4.17	
National Janta Party (Indian)	Vimal Kumar	2,358	1.67	
Independent	Rajnish Kumar	1,705	1.21	
BSP	Javed Alam	1,516	1.07	
NOTA	None of the above	5,212	3.69	
Majority		21,625	15.3	
Turnout		141,330	57.85	
