= Ramashray Prasad Singh (Bihar politician) =

Indian politician from Bihar

- Ramashray Prasad Singh

Leader of the Opposition in the Bihar Legislative Assembly
- In office 29 June 1994 – 15 March 1995
- Preceded by: Jagannath Mishra
- Succeeded by: Yashwant Sinha

Deputy Leader of the ruling party in the Bihar Legislative Council
- In office 2011 – 19 January 2013

Minister of Energy, Government of Bihar
- In office 13 April 2008 – 26 November 2010

Minister of Parliamentary Affairs, Government of Bihar
- In office 2005–2010

Minister of Water Resources, Government of Bihar
- In office 2005–2008

Leader of the Lok Janshakti Party Legislature Party in the Bihar Legislative Assembly
- In office 2005–2005

Member of the Bihar Legislative Council
- In office 2006 – 19 January 2013

Personal details
- Born: 1930 Newari, Jehanabad district, Bihar, British India
- Died: January 19, 2013 Gurgaon, Haryana, India
- Party: Janata Dal (United)
- Other political affiliations: Indian National Congress; Lok Janshakti Party
- Children: 2, including Rajiv Niranjan Singh
- Education: B.A., B. N. College, Patna University
- Occupation: Politician

Ramashray Prasad Singh (1930 – 19 January 2013) was an Indian politician whose legislative and ministerial career in Bihar spanned approximately five decades. A long-serving leader of the Indian National Congress, he later joined the Lok Janshakti Party (LJP) and subsequently the Janata Dal (United) (JD(U)). He served in both houses of the Bihar Legislature, held ministerial office in several state governments, served as Leader of the Opposition in the Bihar Legislative Assembly from 1994 to 1995, led the LJP Legislature Party, and later served as Deputy Leader of the ruling party in the Bihar Legislative Council.

Over the course of his career, Singh held responsibility for departments including Industries, Parliamentary Affairs, Food, Supply and Commerce, Environment, National Savings, Revenue, Land Development, Water Resources and Energy. His political career extended from the Congress-dominated period of Bihar politics through the political realignments of the 1990s and 2000s.

== Early life and education ==
Singh was born in 1930 and hailed from Newari village in the Makhdumpur area of Jehanabad district, Bihar. His father was Lakhan Prasad Singh. His official Bihar Legislative Council election affidavit records his address as Newari, Makhdumpur, Jehanabad, identifies Lakhan Prasad Singh as his father and records his profession as social worker.

Singh completed his Bachelor of Arts degree from Patna University in 1953.

Before entering electoral politics, Singh worked with the Bihar State Road Transport Corporation.

== Personal life ==
Singh was married and had one son and one daughter. Contemporary reporting following his death stated that he was survived by his wife and two children.

His son, Rajiv Niranjan Singh, was identified in contemporary reporting as his son and performed Singh's last rites at Digha Ghat in Patna.

== Political career ==
=== Early political career ===
Singh began his legislative career in 1962 as a member of the Bihar Legislative Council. Contemporary accounts later identified 1962 as the beginning of a legislative career that extended across approximately five decades.

He subsequently entered the Bihar Legislative Assembly. In the 1972 Assembly election, Singh was elected from Kurtha as an Indian National Congress candidate.

Over subsequent decades, his Assembly career included representation of Kurtha, Makhdumpur, Konch and Warisaliganj. Contemporary reporting in 2005 specifically described him as having represented Konch for several years.

=== Ministerial career in Congress governments ===
Singh during an oath-taking ceremony.

Singh served in several Congress governments in Bihar during his long association with the party.

By 1974, Singh had served as a Minister of State in the Bihar government under Chief Minister Abdul Ghafoor.

Following the formation of the Jagannath Mishra ministry in 1980, Singh was appointed a Cabinet Minister with responsibility for Industries (excluding Handloom) and Parliamentary Affairs.

By 1983, Singh's ministerial responsibilities included Food, Supply and Commerce; Environment; Parliamentary Affairs; and National Savings.

Singh returned to the Assembly from Konch in a 1986 by-election as a Congress (I) candidate. The Journal of Parliamentary Information specifically identified Ramashray Prasad Singh of Congress (I) as the winner of the Konch by-election.

In a subsequent Congress government, Singh held responsibility for Revenue, Land Development, the 20-Point Programme, Institutional Finance and Programme Implementation.

In the 1990 Bihar Assembly election, Singh was elected from Konch as the Congress candidate with 83,096 votes, defeating Janata Dal candidate Awadh Singh, who received 47,083 votes.

=== Leader of the Opposition and Congress leadership ===
Singh with Rajiv Gandhi.

Singh served as Leader of the Opposition in the Bihar Legislative Assembly from 29 June 1994 to 15 March 1995 while representing Konch.

In 1995, Singh was elected to the Assembly from Warisaliganj as a Congress candidate. He remained associated with the senior legislative leadership of the Bihar Congress during the later part of his Congress career.

Singh addressing a political rally with Rajiv Gandhi.

=== LJP and the 2005 political realignment ===
After several decades with the Congress, Singh joined the Lok Janshakti Party in January 2005. The Times of India described him at the time as a veteran Congress leader and reported that the LJP would field him from Makhdumpur.

Singh was subsequently elected from Makhdumpur as an LJP candidate in the February 2005 Bihar Assembly election. The official election record identifies Ramashray Prasad Singh as the LJP winner from constituency 226, Makhdumpur.

Following the fractured mandate in the February 2005 election, Singh became leader of the LJP Legislature Party.

During the political realignment later that year, Singh joined the Janata Dal (United). He contested Makhdumpur on the JD(U) ticket in the October 2005 election and was subsequently inducted into the government headed by Chief Minister Nitish Kumar. Contemporary reporting on the formation of the ministry highlighted his previous ministerial experience.

=== Minister in the Nitish Kumar government ===
Singh with Nitish Kumar during his later political career.

Singh was appointed Minister for Water Resources and Parliamentary Affairs in the Nitish Kumar government.

As Water Resources Minister, Singh was involved in Bihar's approach to flood management and river interlinking. Bihar government records identify him as Water Resources Minister during official discussions on these issues in 2006.

The Water Resources Department's 2007 flood report identifies Singh as the department's minister and acknowledges his support for the state's Flood Management Information System.

Singh returned to the Bihar Legislative Council as a JD(U) member. His later Council candidacy records identify him as a JD(U) member elected by members of the Bihar Legislative Assembly.

In April 2008, following a cabinet reorganisation, Singh was entrusted with the Energy portfolio while continuing to handle Parliamentary Affairs.

Singh with President A. P. J. Abdul Kalam.

=== Senior role in the Bihar Legislative Council ===
Following his ministerial tenure, Singh continued to hold a senior position in the Bihar Legislative Council. By 2011, contemporary reporting identified him as Deputy Leader of the ruling party in the Legislative Council.

During Council proceedings in 2011, chairman Tarakant Jha directed Singh, identified as Deputy Leader of the House, to look into a matter raised during zero hour.

In 2012, the JD(U) retained Singh for another term in the Legislative Council. The Times of India again identified him as the deputy leader in the Council.

His election affidavit identifies him as Ramashray Prasad Singh of JD(U), son of the late Lakhan Prasad Singh, and records his B.A. from Patna University.

Singh remained a sitting member of the Bihar Legislative Council until his death.

== Legislative career ==
Singh was elected to both houses of the Bihar Legislature during his political career.

Year	Election
1962	Elected to the Bihar Legislative Council — Congress
1972	Elected from Kurtha — Congress
1980	Elected from Makhdumpur — Congress
1986	Elected from Konch in a by-election — Congress (I)
1990	Re-elected from Konch — Congress
1995	Elected from Warisaliganj — Congress
February 2005	Elected from Makhdumpur — LJP
2006	Elected to the Bihar Legislative Council — JD(U)
2012	Re-elected to the Bihar Legislative Council — JD(U)

The 1972 victory from Kurtha is recorded in the official Bihar election report.

The 1986 Konch by-election victory is recorded by the Journal of Parliamentary Information, which specifically identified Ramashray Prasad Singh of Congress (I) as the winner.

In 1990, Singh was re-elected from Konch with 83,096 votes.

The February 2005 election report records Ramashray Prasad Singh of the LJP as the successful candidate from Makhdumpur.

== Ministerial offices ==
Singh held ministerial office in several Bihar governments during his political career.

Period	Ministerial office
By 1974	Minister of State — Abdul Ghafoor government
1980	Cabinet Minister — Industries (excluding Handloom); Parliamentary Affairs
1983	Cabinet Minister — Food, Supply and Commerce; Environment; Parliamentary Affairs; National Savings
1989	Cabinet Minister — Revenue; Land Development; 20-Point Programme; Institutional Finance; Programme Implementation
2005–2008	Cabinet Minister — Water Resources; Parliamentary Affairs
2008–2010	Cabinet Minister — Energy; Parliamentary Affairs

Singh's service as a Minister of State by 1974 is documented in contemporary parliamentary records.

The 1980 Bihar ministry assigned him Industries (excluding Handloom) and Parliamentary Affairs.

The 1983 record lists Food, Supply and Commerce, Environment, Parliamentary Affairs and National Savings among his responsibilities.

The 1989 Bihar ministry record lists Singh with responsibility for Revenue, Land Development, the 20-Point Programme, Institutional Finance and Programme Implementation.

The Nitish Kumar government assigned Singh Water Resources and Parliamentary Affairs in 2005.

Following the 2008 cabinet reorganisation, he was assigned Energy while continuing to handle Parliamentary Affairs.

== Death and state funeral ==
Singh died on 19 January 2013 while serving as a member of the Bihar Legislative Council and as Deputy Leader of the JD(U) in the upper house. Press Trust of India described him at the time as one of the senior-most leaders of Bihar.

Chief Minister Nitish Kumar announced state mourning following Singh's death.

Singh was cremated at Digha Ghat in Patna with full state honours. His son Rajiv Niranjan Singh lit the funeral pyre. Chief Minister Nitish Kumar, Deputy Chief Minister Sushil Kumar Modi, former Chief Minister Jagannath Mishra, ministers, legislators and leaders from several political parties were among those who paid tribute.

== Legacy ==
Singh's public career encompassed approximately five decades of Bihar's post-independence political history. Beginning his legislative career in the Bihar Legislative Council in 1962, he went on to serve in the Legislative Assembly, hold ministerial responsibility across successive state governments, serve as Leader of the Opposition, lead legislative groups and later serve as Deputy Leader in the Legislative Council.

His career included service with three political parties—Congress, LJP and JD(U)—and ministerial responsibilities in both Congress-led governments and the Nitish Kumar government.

== See also ==
- Bihar Legislative Assembly
- Bihar Legislative Council
- List of leaders of the opposition in the Bihar Legislative Assembly
- Politics of Bihar
