= Rahul Kumar (politician) =

Indian politician (born 1984)

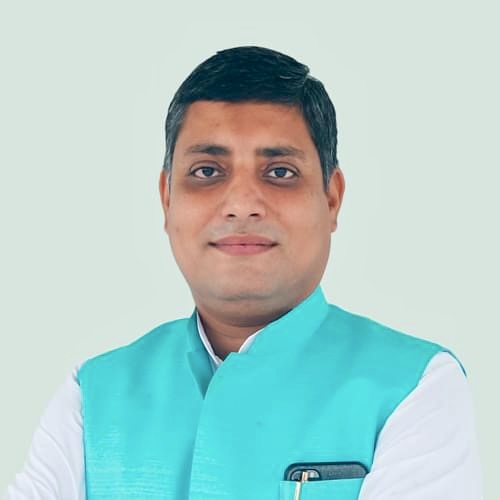

Member of the Legislative Assembly, Vidhan Sabha
- In office 20 November 2010 – 20 November 2015
- Preceded by: Shanti Sharma
- Constituency: Ghosi (Vidhan Sabha constituency)

Member of Bihar Legislative Assembly
- Incumbent
- Assumed office 14 November 2025
- Preceded by: Suday Yadav
- Constituency: Jehanabad

Personal details
- Born: 21 September 1984 (age 42) Korra, Ghosi, Jehanabad, Bihar
- Party: Rashtriya Janata Dal
- Spouse: Shalini Sharma
- Children: 2 daughters
- Education: Ramakrishna Mission Vidyapith

Rahul Kumar (born 21 September 1984) is an Indian politician of Rashtriya Janata Dal from the state of Bihar, India, is a member of the Bihar Legislative Assembly from Jehanabad Vidhan Sabha Constituency, He was also a member of the Bihar Legislative Assembly for Term 2010 - 2015 from Ghosi (Vidhan Sabha constituency). His father, Dr. Jagdish Sharma, was also, a member of the JDU and an MP from Jehanabad Bihar. Kumar defeated Jagdish Prasad alias Kaushal Yadav of LJP in Ghosi (Vidhan Sabha constituency) seat in 2010 Vidhan Sabha elections, in Jehanabad district of Bihar.

== Early life and education ==
Rahul Kumar was born on 21 September 1984 in Korra village in Ghosi area in Jehanabad district of Bihar. His father Dr. Jagdish Sharma was Member of Parliament, and his mother, Shanti Devi, was a Member of the Legislative Assembly. He completed his education Ramakrishna Mission Vidyapith, Deoghar after completing his graduation and Management from Symbiosis University of Applied Sciences, Pune he worked at the Japanese company Sona Koyo in Gurgaon.

== Political career ==
From 2015 to 2019, Kumar was a member of Hindustani Awam Morcha, a centre-left political party associated with the United Progressive Alliance. In 2019, he joined Janata Dal, another centre-left party with socialist ideals.

He was elected to the Bihar Legislative Assembly from the Ghosi (Vidhan Sabha constituency) as a member of the Janata Dal (United) in 2010.

In 2014, he visited United States to participate in ACYPL conference and delivered a lecture on an election exchange programme.
