= Mahesh Singh Yadav =

Indian politician

Member of the Bihar Legislative Assembly
- In office 1998–2000
- Preceded by: Surendra Prasad Yadav
- Succeeded by: Surendra Prasad Yadav
- Constituency: Belaganj
- In office 2000–2005
- Preceded by: Shiv Bachan Yadav
- Constituency: Tikari

Personal details
- Party: Rashtriya Janata Dal
- Parent: Ram Chandra Prasad Yadav (Father)
- Education: Magadh University
- Occupation: Politician; Social work

Mahesh Singh Yadav is an Indian politician from Bihar. He is an MLA from Belaganj Assembly constituency as well as from Tikari Assembly constituency in Gaya district representing Rashtriya Janata Dal. He won the 2000 Bihar Legislative Assembly election.
