= Belaganj Assembly constituency =

Assembly constituency in Bihar

Coordinates: 24.97°N 84.97°E

Belaganj
- Constituency No. 232 for the Bihar Legislative Assembly

Constituency details
- Country: India
- Region: East India
- State: Bihar
- District: Gaya
- Lok Sabha constituency: Gaya
- Established: 1962
- Total electors: 279,839

Member of Legislative Assembly
- 18th Bihar Legislative Assembly
- Incumbent Manorama Devi
- Party: JD(U)
- Alliance: NDA
- Elected year: 2025
- Preceded by: Surendra Prasad Yadav; RJD

Belaganj is an assembly constituency for Bihar Legislative Assembly in Gaya district of Bihar, India. It comes under Gaya (Lok Sabha constituency). After 2009 delimitation, Belaganj Block and most parts of the Sadar Block come under Belaganj Constituency.

== Members of the Legislative Assembly ==
Year	Member	Party
1962	Rameshwar Manjhi	Indian National Congress
1967	Sachchidanand Singh	Samyukta Socialist Party
1969	Mithleshwar Prasad Singh	Indian National Congress
1972	Jitendra Prasad Singh	Indian National Congress
1977	Shambhu Prasad Singh	Janata Party
1980	Shatrughna Sharan Singh	Indian National Congress
1985	Abhiram Sharma	Indian National Congress
1990	Surendra Prasad Yadav	Janata Dal
1995	Surendra Prasad Yadav	Janata Dal
1998^	Mahesh Singh Yadav	Rashtriya Janata Dal
2000	Surendra Prasad Yadav	Rashtriya Janata Dal
2005	Surendra Prasad Yadav	Rashtriya Janata Dal
2005	Surendra Prasad Yadav	Rashtriya Janata Dal
2010	Surendra Prasad Yadav	Rashtriya Janata Dal
2015	Surendra Prasad Yadav	Rashtriya Janata Dal
2020	Surendra Prasad Yadav	Rashtriya Janata Dal
2024^	Manorama Devi	Janata Dal (United)
2025	Manorama Devi	Janata Dal (United)

== Election results ==
=== 2025 ===
Bihar Legislative Assembly Election, 2025: Belaganj
Party	Candidate	Votes	%	±%
JD(U)	Manorama Devi	95,685	46.67	+13.86
RJD	Vishwanath Kumar Singh	92,803	45.27	−1.64
Independent	Lalu Yadav	2,769	1.35	
Independent	Vibhuti Narayan Singh	2,562	1.25	
AAP	Madumala Kumari	2,204	1.08	
NOTA	None of the above	3,074	1.5	−0.31
Majority		2,882	1.4	−12.7
Turnout		205,019	73.26	+11.89
JD(U) hold		Swing	1.4 %	

=== 2024 bypoll ===
Bihar Legislative Assembly by-election 2024: Belaganj
Party	Candidate	Votes	%	±%
JD(U)	Manorama Devi	73,334	45.23	+12.42
RJD	Vishwanath Kumar Singh	51,943	32.03	−14.88
JSP	Mohammad Amajad	17,285	10.66	New
NOTA	None of the Above	5,819	3.59	+1.78
Majority		21,319	13.20	−1.02
Turnout		1,62,149		
JD(U) gain from RJD		Swing	+12.42	

=== 2020 ===
2020 Bihar Legislative Assembly election: Belaganj
Party	Candidate	Votes	%	±%
RJD	Surendra Prasad Yadav	79,708	46.91	▼2.47
JD(U)	Abhay Kumar Sinha	55,745	32.81	
LJP	Ramashray Sharma	12,005	7.07	
Independent	Syed Sharim Ali	4,411	2.6	
Samajwadi Janata Dal Democratic	Mohammed Ekram	3,803	2.24	
Independent	Geeta Devi	2,635	1.55	
Independent	Arun Kumar	1,803	1.06	
Independent	Mohammed Iqbal	1,796	1.06	
NOTA	None of the above	3,071	1.81	▼1.2
Majority		23,963	14.1	▼6.98
Turnout		169,907	61.37	▲3.7
RJD hold		Swing		

=== 2015 ===
2015 Bihar Legislative Assembly election: Belaganj
Party	Candidate	Votes	%	±%
RJD	Surendra Prasad Yadav	71,067	49.38	
HAM(S)	Sharim Ali	40,726	28.3	
CPI	Kumar Jitendra	8,114	5.64	
ABHM	Vibha Devi	3,349	2.33	
BSP	Sheikh Ayub	2,725	1.89	
Krantikari Vikas Dal	Anand Kumar	2,225	1.55	
Independent	Ashok Yadav	2,222	1.54	
Bharat Bhrashtachar Mitao Party	Shahadat Hussain	2,160	1.5	
SP	Sardar Mathura Yadav	2,090	1.45	
National Janta Party (Indian)	Ravindra Prasad Verma	2,009	1.4	
Sarvajan Kalyan Loktantrik Party	Md Yusuf Ahmad	1,559	1.08	
BVM	Kundan Kumar	1,356	0.94	
NOTA	None of the above	4,331	3.01	
Majority		30,341	21.08	
Turnout		143,933	57.67	
