= Kurtha Assembly constituency =

Assembly constituency in Bihar, India

- Constituency No. 215 for the Bihar Legislative Assembly

Constituency details
- Country: India
- Region: East India
- State: Bihar
- District: Arwal
- Established: 1951
- Total electors: 259,061

Member of Legislative Assembly
- 18th Bihar Legislative Assembly
- Incumbent Pappu Kumar Verma
- Party: JD(U)
- Alliance: NDA
- Elected year: 2025

Kurtha Assembly constituency is an assembly constituency in Arwal district of Bihar. It is the part of Jahanabad (Lok Sabha constituency). In Kurtha constituency, Kushwaha, Yadav and Bhumihar voters are descisive in ensuring victory of a candidate, due to their numerical preponderance. In 1969, the Shoshit Samaj Party leader, Jagdev Prasad, who was also called 'Lenin of Bihar', won from this assembly constituency. Satyadev Kushwaha won twice in 2010 and 2015 from here. In 2020, however, he was defeated by Bagi Kumar Verma of Rashtriya Janata Dal.

== Members of the Legislative Assembly ==
Year	Name	Party
1952	Ramacharan Singh Yadav	Socialist Party
1957	Kameshwar Sharma	Indian National Congress
1962	Ramacharan Singh Yadav	Praja Socialist Party
1967	Jagdeo Prasad	Samyukta Socialist Party
1969	Jagdeo Prasad	Shoshit Dal
1972	Ramashray Prasad Singh Yadav	Indian National Congress
1977	Nagmani Kushwaha	Shoshit Samaj Dal
1980	Sahdev Prasad Yadav	Janata Party
1985	Nagmani Kushwaha	Independent politician
1990	Mudrika Singh Yadav	Janata Dal
1995	Sahdev Prasad Yadav	Janata Dal
2000	Shiv Bachan Yadav	Rashtriya Janata Dal
2005	Suchitra Sinha	Lok Janshakti Party
2010	Satyadev Kushwaha	Janata Dal (United)
2015	Satyadev Kushwaha	Janata Dal (United)
2020	Bagi Kumar Verma	Rashtriya Janata Dal
2025	Pappu Kumar Verma	Janata Dal (United)

== Election results ==
=== 2025 ===
Detailed Results at: https://results.eci.gov.in/ResultAcGenNov2025/candidateswise-S04215.htm

2025 Bihar Legislative Assembly election: Kurtha
Party	Candidate	Votes	%	±%
JD(U)	Pappu Kumar Verma	74,466	44.9	+25.64
RJD	Kumar Krishna Mohan (Suday Yadav)	68,985	41.59	+2.05
JSP	Rambali Singh	5,030	3.03	
BSP	Ashok Kumar	3,338	2.01	
Independent	Buddhadev Sav	2,327	1.4	
Independent	Raushan Kumar	1,642	0.99	
NOTA	None of the above	1,783	1.07	+0.2
Majority		5,481	3.31	−16.97
Turnout		165,867	64.03	+8.9
JD(U) gain from RJD		Swing		

=== 2020 ===
Bihar Assembly election, 2020: Kurtha
Party	Candidate	Votes	%	±%
RJD	Bagi Kumar Verma	54,227	39.54	
JD(U)	Satyadeo Singh	26,417	19.26	−18.53
LJP	Bhuwneshwar Pathak	20,509	14.95	
RLSP	Pappu Kumar Verma	16,158	11.78	−13.79
Independent	Santosh Kumar Singh	2,802	2.04	
JAP(L)	Jamaludin Ansari	2,079	1.52	
Independent	Rampravesh Yadav	1,677	1.22	
Independent	Ajay Kumar	1,616	1.18	
Bhartiya Sablog Party	Suchitra Sinha	1,574	1.15	
Independent	Md Abdullah Jamal Malik	1,499	1.09	
Loktantrik Janta Dal	Rajendra Yadav	1,392	1.01	
Independent	Deepak Kumar	1,291	0.94	
NOTA	None of the above	1,200	0.87	−1.34
Majority		27,810	20.28	+8.06
Turnout		137,144	55.13	+5.22
RJD gain from JD(U)		Swing		

=== 2015 ===
2015 Bihar Legislative Assembly election: Kurtha
Party	Candidate	Votes	%	±%
JD(U)	Satyadeo Singh	43,676	37.79	
RLSP	Ashok Kumar Verma	29,557	25.57	
BSP	Rajendra Yadav	8,896	7.7	
Independent	Prof. Ram Jatan Sinha	6,285	5.44	
SS	Bindal Kumar Alias Indal Yadav	5,868	5.08	
CPI(ML)L	Avadhesh Kumar	3,960	3.43	
Garib Janta Dal (Secular)	Dr.Satyendra Prakash Yadav	1,711	1.48	
Independent	Keshav Prasad	1,676	1.45	
Independent	Sunil Kumar	1,301	1.13	
Samras Samaj Party	Nagmani	1,187	1.03	
Independent	Ramnath Prasad	1,070	0.93	
NOTA	None of the above	2,551	2.21	
Majority		14,119	12.22	
Turnout		115,570	49.91	
