= Syed Asghar Hussain =

Indian politician (1956 – 2013)

- Born: 20 October 1956; Jehanabad, Bihar, India
- Died: 25 February 2013 (aged 56)
- Political party: Indian National Congress

Syed Asghar Hussain (20 October 1956 – 25 February 2013) was an Indian politician from Jehanabad, Bihar, representing the Indian National Congress. He served as a Member of the Legislative Assembly (MLA) for Jehanabad and gained prominence in the 1985 state elections. His political legacy is carried forward by his younger brother, Munna Hussain.

== Early life and education ==
Syed Asghar Hussain was born in Jehanabad, Bihar, India. He pursued his education in local schools and later graduated from Magadh University with a degree in Political Science.

== Political career ==
As a member of the Indian National Congress, Hussain entered the political arena in the 1980s. He contested the state legislative election (Vidhan Sabha) and won the Jehanabad Assembly constituency in the 1985 elections, securing 45,857 votes (40.4% of the total votes) and became an MLA. His closest competitor, Hari Lal Prasad Sinha, an independent candidate, received 20,465 votes. This victory marked the beginning of Hussain's political prominence in the region.

=== Subsequent elections ===
In the following elections, Hussain faced stiff competition from emerging regional parties. In the 1995 elections, he lost to Mundrika Singh Yadav of the Janata Dal, who received 60,933 votes compared to Hussain's 38,665 votes. His political career reflects the shifting dynamics in Bihar's political landscape, where the Congress party began to lose its stronghold to regional parties like the Janata Dal (United) and Rashtriya Janata Dal.

== Family ==
Syed Asghar Hussain was married to Rana Suraiya, and they had three children: an eldest daughter, Zainab Fatima; an eldest son, Umar Sani, who is currently an active businessman; and a youngest son, Shish Hussain, who is settled in the UK. Syed Asghar Hussain died due to cancer.

== Political legacy ==
Syed Asghar Hussain's political legacy is being continued by his younger brother, Azhar Jamil, also known as Munna Hussain. Munna is a notable figure in Bihar's political landscape and is committed to addressing local issues and enhancing the welfare of constituents.

Syed Asghar Hussain is remembered for his contributions to the political landscape of Jehanabad and Bihar during a transformative period.
