= Makhdumpur Assembly constituency =

Assembly constituency in Bihar, India

Coordinates: 25.07°N 84.97°E

- Constituency No. - for the Bihar Legislative Assembly

Constituency details
- Country: India
- Region: East India
- State: Bihar
- District: Jehanabad
- Lok Sabha constituency: Jehanabad
- Established: 1951
- Total electors: 249,011

Member of Legislative Assembly
- 18th Bihar Legislative Assembly
- Incumbent Subedar Das
- Party: RJD
- Alliance: MGB
- Elected year: 2025

Makhdumpur Assembly constituency is an assembly constituency for Bihar Legislative Assembly in Jehanabad district of Bihar, India. It comes under Jahanabad (Lok Sabha constituency).

== Members of the Legislative Assembly ==
Year	Member	Party
1952	Rameshwar Yadav	Independent politician
1957	Mithileshwar Prasad Singh	Indian National Congress
1962	Sukhdeo Prasad Verma	Indian National Congress
1967	L. Ram	Samyukta Socialist Party
1969	Mahabir Choudhary	Indian National Congress
1972	Ram Sawroop Ram	Indian National Congress
1977	Ram Jatan Sinha	Janata Party
1980	Ramashray Prasad Singh	Indian National Congress
1985	Ram Jatan Sinha	Indian National Congress
1990	Ram Jatan Sinha	Indian National Congress
1995	Bagi Kumar Verma	Janata Dal
2000	Bagi Kumar Verma	Rashtriya Janata Dal
2005	Ramashray Prasad Singh	Lok Janshakti Party
2005	Krishnandan Prasad Varma	Rashtriya Janata Dal
2010	Jitan Ram Manjhi	Janata Dal (United)
2015	Subedar Das	Rashtriya Janata Dal
2020	Satish Kumar	Rashtriya Janata Dal
2025	Subedar Das	Rashtriya Janata Dal

== Election results ==
=== 2025 ===
Bihar Legislative Assembly Election, 2025: Makhdumpur
Party	Candidate	Votes	%	±%
RJD	Subedar Das	74,769	44.93	−7.08
LJP(RV)	Rani Kumari	72,939	43.83	
JSP	Shankar Swarup	4,803	2.89	
BSP	Sudhir Choudhary	3,517	2.11	−1.54
Independent	Shailendra Chaudhari	2,757	1.66	
RLJP	Chhotelal Paswan	1,733	1.04	
NOTA	None of the above	2,760	1.66	+0.06
Majority		1,830	1.1	−15.29
Turnout		166,399	66.82	+10.14
RJD hold		Swing		

=== 2020 ===
2020 Bihar Legislative Assembly election: Makhdumpur
Party	Candidate	Votes	%	±%
RJD	Satish Kumar	71,571	52.01	+0.85
HAM(S)	Devendra Kumar	49,006	35.62	+5.02
BSP	Byas Muni Das	5,025	3.65	+2.08
Independent	Dharmendra Kumar	3,200	2.33	
Nation First Democratic Party	Avadh Paswan	1,793	1.3	
Independent	Ranjit Paswan	1,580	1.15	
Sanyukt Kisan Vikas Party	Ful Chand Manjhi	1,347	0.98	
NOTA	None of the above	2,196	1.6	−1.11
Majority		22,565	16.39	−4.17
Turnout		137,599	56.68	−1.77
RJD hold		Swing		

=== 2015 ===
2015 Bihar Legislative Assembly election: Makhdumpur
Party	Candidate	Votes	%	±%
RJD	Subedar Das	66,631	51.16	
HAM(S)	Jitan Ram Manjhi	39,854	30.6	
CPI(ML)L	Dhananjay Kishor	4,705	3.61	
Rastriya Sadabahar Party	Kunjan Kumar	2,196	1.69	
NDP	Ramanuj Paswan	2,178	1.67	
BSP	Mritunjay Paswan	2,045	1.57	
Bharatiya Inqalab Party	Arun Kumar	1,843	1.42	
Samras Samaj Party	Kusum Devi	1,375	1.06	
SP	Komal Paswan	1,366	1.05	
Rashtriya Jan Jan Party	Awadh Paswan	1,300	1.0	
RPI	Parmanand Paswan	1,282	0.98	
NOTA	None of the above	3,536	2.71	
Majority		26,777	20.56	
Turnout		130,243	58.45	
