= Ram Chandra Yadav =

Ram Chandra Yadav may refer to:

- Ram Chandra Yadav (Uttar Pradesh politician)
- Ram Chandra Yadav (Bihar politician)
