= Jahanabad Lok Sabha constituency =

Lok Sabha Constituency in Bihar

Coordinates: 25.2°N 85.0°E

Jahanabad
- Lok Sabha constituency

Constituency details
- Country: India
- Region: East India
- State: Bihar
- Assembly constituencies: Arwal; Kurtha; Jehanabad; Ghosi; Makhdumpur; Atri
- Established: 1957
- Reservation: None

Member of Parliament
- 18th Lok Sabha
- Incumbent Surendra Prasad Yadav
- Party: RJD
- Alliance: INDIA
- Elected year: 2024
- Preceded by: Chandeshwar Prasad, JD(U)

Jahanabad Lok Sabha constituency is one of the 40 Lok Sabha (parliamentary) constituencies in Bihar,India.

== Assembly Segments ==
Jahanabad Lok Sabha constituency comprises the following Vidhan Sabha (legislative assembly) segments:

#	Name	District	Member	Party	2024 lead
214	Arwal	Arwal	Manoj Kumar Sharma	BJP	RJD
215	Kurtha	Arwal	Pappu Kumar Verma	JD(U)	RJD
216	Jehanabad	Jehanabad	Rahul Sharma	RJD	RJD
217	Ghosi	Jehanabad	Rituraj Sharma	JD(U)	RJD
218	Makhdumpur (SC)	Jehanabad	Subedar Das	RJD	RJD
233	Atri	Gaya	Romit Kumar	HAM(S)	RJD

== Members of Parliament ==
Year	Name	Party
1957	Satyabhama Devi	Indian National Congress
1962	Satyabhama Devi	Indian National Congress
1967	Chandrasekhar Singh	Communist Party of India
1971	Chandrasekhar Singh	Communist Party of India
1977	Hari Lal Prasad Sinha	Janata Party
1980	Mahendra Prasad	Indian National Congress
1984	Ramashray Prasad Singh	Communist Party of India
1989	Ramashray Prasad Singh	Communist Party of India
1991	Ramashray Prasad Singh	Communist Party of India
1996	Ramashray Prasad Singh	Communist Party of India
1998	Surendra Prasad Yadav	Rashtriya Janata Dal
1999	Arun Kumar	Janata Dal (United)
2004	Ganesh Prasad Singh	Rashtriya Janata Dal
2009	Jagdish Sharma	Janata Dal (United)
2014	Arun Kumar	Rashtriya Lok Samata Party
2019	Chandeshwar Prasad	Janata Dal (United)
2024	Surendra Prasad Yadav	Rashtriya Janata Dal

== Election Results ==
=== 2024 ===
2024 Indian general elections: Jahanabad
Party	Candidate	Votes	%	±%
RJD	Surendra Prasad Yadav	453,035	47.88	▲5.93
JD(U)	Chandeshwar Prasad	3,00,444	32.47	▼9.70
BSP	Dr. Arun Kumar	86,380	9.33	▲6.92
NOTA	None of the above	11,055	1.19	▼2.29
Majority		1,52,591	15.41	
Turnout		9,27,696	55.26	
RJD gain from JD(U)		Swing		

=== 2019 ===
2019 Indian general elections: Jahanabad
Party	Candidate	Votes	%	±%
JD(U)	Chandeshwar Prasad	335,584	42.17	
RJD	Surendra Prasad Yadav	3,33,833	41.95	
RSP(S)	Dr. Arun Kumar	34,558	4.34	
NOTA	None of the Above	27,683	3.48	
BSP	Nitya Nand Singh	19,211	2.41	
Majority		1,751	0.22	−5.00
Turnout		8,22,233	51.76	
JD(U) gain from RLSP		Swing		

=== 2014 ===
2014 Indian general elections: Jahanabad
Party	Candidate	Votes	%	±%
RLSP	Dr. Arun Kumar	322,647	39.76	New
RJD	Surendra Prasad Yadav	2,80,307	34.54	−1.14
JD(U)	Anil Kumar Sharma	1,00,851	12.43	
CPI(ML)L	Ramadhar Singh	34,365	4.23	
IND	Nityanand Singh	10,625	1.31	
Majority		42,340	5.22	+1.6
Turnout		8,11,852	57.04	+10.11
RLSP gain from JD(U)		Swing		

== See also ==
- Arwal district
- Jehanabad district
- List of constituencies of the Lok Sabha
