= Maya Bigha =

- village
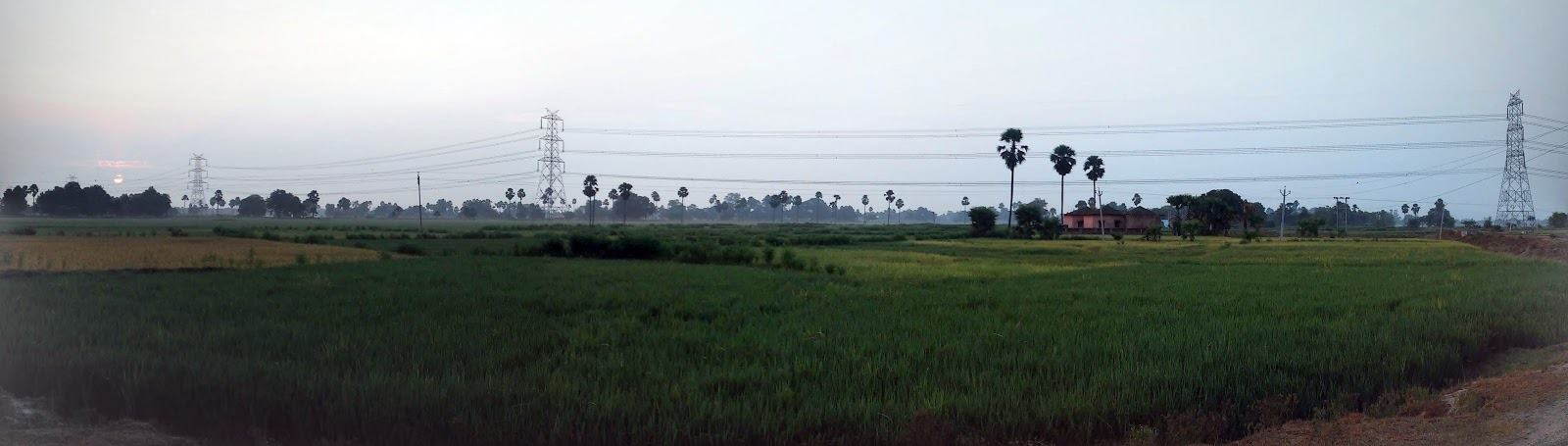
- Interactive map of Maya Bigha
- Coordinates: 25°06′10.9″N 85°05′31.8″E
- Country: India
- State: Bihar
- District: Jehanabad
- Founded by: Ram Ratan Yadav

Area
  - Total: 3 km^{2} (1.2 sq mi)

Population (1500)
  - Total: 1,500
  - Density: 500/km^{2} (1,300/sq mi)

Languages
  - Official: Maghi, Hindi
- Time zone: UTC+5:30 (IST)
- PIN: 804406
- Telephone code: 06114
- ISO 3166 code: IN-BR
- Vehicle registration: BR-25
- Nearest city: Ghosi
- Sex ratio: 970 ♂/♀
- Literacy: 88%%
- Lok Sabha constituency: Jehanabad
- Vidhan Sabha constituency: Ghosi

Maya Bigha is a small village located in Jehanabad district of Bihar state, India. The current population of this village is 1052, and the literacy rate is 84%. Mukhiya of this village is "Asha Devi" from Kurre village. The village is part and part of Kurre Panchayat.

Maya Bigha is a small village in the state of Bihar in Eastern India. It is approximately 15 km west of Islampur town and also 10 km south from Ghoshi town. Barabar hills, which is a tourist destination is about 20 km south of this village. Barabar hills has historical importance and is a pilgrimage shrine for Hindus. Bodhgaya is situated about 50 km south of this village and Rajgir is situated about 60 km east of this small village.

There is a primary school in the village.
