= Jugsalai Assembly constituency =

Constituency of the Jharkhand legislative assembly in India

Coordinates: 22.763°N 86.188°E

Jugsalai
- Constituency No. 47 for the Jharkhand Legislative Assembly

Constituency details
- Country: India
- Region: East India
- State: Jharkhand
- District: East Singhbhum
- Lok Sabha constituency: Jamshedpur
- Established: 2000
- Total electors: 327,048
- Reservation: SC

Member of Legislative Assembly
- 5th Jharkhand Legislative Assembly
- Incumbent Mangal Kalindi
- Party: JMM
- Alliance: MGB
- Elected year: 2024

Jugsalai Assembly constituency is an assembly constituency in the Indian state of Jharkhand.

Most successful parties after separate Jharkhand state.
1. JMM (60.0%)
2. AJSU (40.0%)

== Overview ==
According to the Delimitation of Parliamentary and Assembly Constituencies Order, 2008 of the Election Commission of India, Jugsalai Assembly constituency covers Jugsalai police station (excluding Bagbera town and Karandih-Purihasa, Hargarghutu, Bagbera gram panchayats and Kitadih village), Golmuri and Patamda police stations . It is a reserved constituency for Scheduled Castes. Jugsalai (Vidhan Sabha constituency) is a part of Jamshedpur (Lok Sabha constituency).

== Members of the Legislative Assembly ==
Election	Member	Party
Bihar Legislative Assembly
Before 1957: see Jugsalai cum Potka constituency
1957	V. G. Gopal	Indian National Congress
1962	Sunil Mukherjee	Communist Party of India
1967	Majhi Rasraj Tudu	Indian National Congress
1969	Sanatan Majhi	Independent politician
1972	Sanatan Majhi	Independent politician
1977	Kartik Kumar	Janata Party
1980	Tulsi Rajak	Communist Party of India
1985	Trilochan Kalindi	Indian National Congress
1990	Mangal Ram	Jharkhand Mukti Morcha
1995	Dulal Bhuiyan	Jharkhand Mukti Morcha
2000	Dulal Bhuiyan	Jharkhand Mukti Morcha
Jharkhand Legislative Assembly
2005	Dulal Bhuiyan	Jharkhand Mukti Morcha
2009	Ram Chandra Sahis	All Jharkhand Students Union
2014	Ram Chandra Sahis	All Jharkhand Students Union
2019	Mangal Kalindi	Jharkhand Mukti Morcha
2024	Mangal Kalindi	Jharkhand Mukti Morcha

== Election results ==
=== Assembly election 2024 ===
2024 Jharkhand Legislative Assembly election: Jugsalai
Party	Candidate	Votes	%	±%
JMM	Mangal Kalindi	121,290	48.26	▲7.31
AJSU	Ram Chandra Sahis	77,845	30.97	▲9.35
JLKM	Binod Swansi	36,998	14.72	New
Independent	Vimal Kishor Baitha	2,632	1.05	New
Independent	Biplav Bhuiyan	2,100	0.84	New
NOTA	None of the Above	4,081	1.62	▲0.19
Margin of victory		43,445	17.28	▲7.14
Turnout		2,51,349	71.11	▲4.97
Registered electors		3,53,447		▲8.07
JMM hold		Swing	▲7.31	

=== Assembly election 2019 ===
2019 Jharkhand Legislative Assembly election: Jugsalai
Party	Candidate	Votes	%	±%
JMM	Mangal Kalindi	88,581	40.95	▲12.93
BJP	Muchiram Bauri	66,647	30.81	New
AJSU	Ram Chandra Sahis	46,779	21.63	▼18.65
JVM(P)	Ramchandra Paswan	3,008	1.39	▼0.34
API	Bijay Mukhi	1,922	0.89	New
Independent	Vishal Kumar Das	1,411	0.65	New
SS	Bablu Ruhidas	1,362	0.63	New
NOTA	None of the Above	3,093	1.43	▼0.22
Margin of victory		21,934	10.14	▼2.12
Turnout		2,16,313	66.14	▼1.24
Registered electors		3,27,048		▲7.85
JMM gain from AJSU		Swing	▲0.67	

=== Assembly election 2014 ===
2014 Jharkhand Legislative Assembly election: Jugsalai
Party	Candidate	Votes	%	±%
AJSU	Ram Chandra Sahis	82,302	40.28	▲11.65
JMM	Mangal Kalindi	57,257	28.02	▲4.20
INC	Dulal Bhuiyan	42,101	20.60	▲9.18
CPI	Ramesh Mukhi	4,736	2.32	New
JVM(P)	Vishal Kumar Das	3,544	1.73	New
SUCI(C)	Rajesh Sahis	1,980	0.97	New
BSP	Chaitu Ram	1,449	0.71	New
NOTA	None of the Above	3,368	1.65	New
Margin of victory		25,045	12.26	▲9.93
Turnout		2,04,341	67.38	▲7.38
Registered electors		3,03,248		▲21.67
AJSU hold		Swing	▲11.65	

=== Assembly election 2009 ===
2009 Jharkhand Legislative Assembly election: Jugsalai
Party	Candidate	Votes	%	±%
AJSU	Ram Chandra Sahis	42,810	28.63	▲24.20
BJP	Rakhi Roy	39,328	26.30	▼14.26
JMM	Dulal Bhuiyan	35,629	23.82	▼18.63
INC	Ritika Mukhi	17,087	11.43	New
RJD	Sharda Devi	2,894	1.94	▼2.90
Independent	Haradhan Das	2,798	1.87	New
Independent	Mangal Kalindi	2,501	1.67	New
Margin of victory		3,482	2.33	▲0.44
Turnout		1,49,550	60.00	▲3.37
Registered electors		2,49,247		▲0.45
AJSU gain from JMM		Swing	▼13.82	

=== Assembly election 2005 ===
2005 Jharkhand Legislative Assembly election: Jugsalai
Party	Candidate	Votes	%	±%
JMM	Dulal Bhuiyan	59,649	42.45	▼16.81
BJP	Haradhan Das	56,995	40.56	▲18.00
RJD	Baldeo Hazra	6,796	4.84	▲1.48
AJSU	Rakhi Roy	6,225	4.43	New
BSP	Deepak Kumar Lal	2,674	1.90	New
Independent	Lakhindar Mukhi Alias Vishal Mukhi	2,429	1.73	New
SJP(R)	Tarachand Kalindi	1,616	1.15	New
Margin of victory		2,654	1.89	▼34.81
Turnout		1,40,514	56.63	▲1.57
Registered electors		2,48,132		▲15.69
JMM hold		Swing	▼16.81	

=== Assembly election 2000 ===
2000 Bihar Legislative Assembly election: Jugsalai
Party	Candidate	Votes	%	±%
JMM	Dulal Bhuiyan	69,989	59.26	New
BJP	Mangal Ram	26,648	22.56	New
INC	Hari Mukhi	12,999	11.01	New
RJD	Bhaskar Mukhi	3,961	3.35	New
CPI	Ram Ayodhya Ram	3,685	3.12	New
Margin of victory		43,341	36.70	
Turnout		1,18,096	55.75	
Registered electors		2,14,472		
JMM win (new seat)				

== See also ==
- Vidhan Sabha
- List of states of India by type of legislature
