= Ram Yadav =

Ram Yadav may refer to:

- Ram Baran Yadav (born 1948), Nepali politician and former President of Nepal
- Ram Chandra Yadav (Uttar Pradesh politician) (born 1961), Indian politician
- Ram Chandra Yadav (Bihar politician)
- Ram Gopal Yadav (born 1946), Indian politician and Member of Parliament
- Ram Naresh Yadav (1928–2016), Indian politician and former Chief Minister of Uttar Pradesh
- Ram Sharan Yadav (1926–2005), Indian politician and Member of Parliament
- Ram Yadav, fictional character in the 1997 Indian film Tarazu, played by Akshay Kumar
