= Munni Lal Yadav =

Indian politician

Member of the Bihar Legislative Assembly
- In office 2000–2005
- Preceded by: Mudrika Singh Yadav
- Succeeded by: Sachidanand Yadav
- Constituency: Jehanabad

Personal details
- Party: Rashtriya Janata Dal
- Occupation: Politician social work

Munni Lal Yadav is an Indian politician who was elected as a member of Bihar Legislative Assembly from Jehanabad constituency in 2000 as the candidate of Rashtriya Janata Dal.

== See also ==
- Jehanabad Assembly constituency
