= Pappu Kumar Verma =

Indian politician

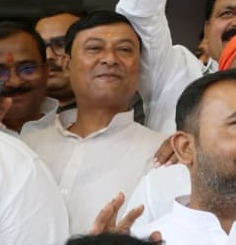

Member of the Bihar Legislative Assembly
- Incumbent
- Assumed office 2020
- Constituency: Kurtha

Personal details
- Party: Janata Dal (United)
- Other political affiliations: Rashtriya Lok Morcha

Pappu Kumar Verma is an Indian politician and a member of Janata Dal (United) political party led by Nitish Kumar. He was associated with Rashtriya Lok Morcha of Upendra Kushwaha, but was fielded as a JDU candidate from Kurtha Assembly constituency in 2025 Bihar Legislative Assembly elections. He won the 2025 Legislative Assembly election by defeating Suday Yadav of Rashtriya Janata Dal.

== Legislative career ==
In his first term as legislator, he raised the issue of poor condition of community health centres in his constituency. He further highlighted the issues such as lack of surgeons and female doctors in these centres and insufficient stocks of generic medicines. He demanded from the Government of Bihar to address these issues so that the beneficiaries shouldn't move to town areas for availing even basic medical facilities.
