= Ram Bali Singh Yadav =

Indian politician

Member of Bihar Legislative Assembly (MLA)
- Preceded by: Krishna Nandan Prasad Verma
- Succeeded by: Rituraj Kumar
- Constituency: Ghosi

Personal details
- Party: CPI(M–L)L
- Occupation: Politics

Ram Bali Singh Yadav is an Indian politician from Bihar and a Member of the Bihar Legislative Assembly. Yadav won the Ghosi (Vidhan Sabha constituency) on the CPI(M–L)L ticket in the 2020 Bihar Legislative Assembly election.
