= Arun Kumar (Bihar politician) =

Indian politician

Member of the Lok Sabha
- In office 1999–2004
- In office 2014–2019
- Constituency: Jahanabad

Member of the Bihar Legislative Council
- In office 1993–1999

Personal details
- Born: 2 October 1959 (age 67) Maniyawan, Jehanabad, Bihar, India
- Party: Janata Dal (United)
- Other political affiliations: Bahujan Samaj Party (2024–2025); Lok Janshakti Party (Ram Vilas) (2021–2024)
- Spouse: Nirmala Kumari
- Children: 1 son, 1 daughter
- Education: Magadh University (PhD)
- Website: www.drarunkumar.in

Arun Kumar (born 2 October 1959) is an Indian politician. He represented Jahanabad constituency in Lok Sabha.

== Career ==
Kumar won the seat in 1999 and again in the 2014 Indian general election. He is a founding member of the Rashtriya Samata Party (Secular).

He is the founder and head of Gyan Bharti Model Residential Complex school in Hisua, Nawada. He often visits the school during Annual Day functions as chief guest. He was a close friend of Bihar ex-MP Anand Mohan Singh of Saharsa. He founded Bharatiya Sab Log Party in 2020.

== Personal life ==
His brother Anil Kumar is a member of legislative assembly from Tikari assembly constituency in Bihar.

== Bhartiya Sab Log Party ==
Bhartiya Sab Log Party (BSLP) was founded by Kumar and Yashwant Sinha before the 2020 Bihar Legislative Assembly elections. BSLP contested 30 seats in 2020 Bihar Elections, losing every race. In January 2022, BSLP merged with Lok Janshakti Party (Ram Vilas).

Bharatiya Sab Log Party
- Leader: Yashwant Sinha
- President: Arun Kumar
- Founder: Arun Kumar
- Founded: 2020
- Split from: Rashtriya Lok Samta Party
- Merged into: Lok Janshakti Party (Ram Vilas)
- ECI status: Registered

Website
- www.bhartiyasablogparty.in
