= Sachidanand Yadav =

Indian politician

Member of the Bihar Legislative Assembly
- In office 2005–2010
- Preceded by: Munni Lal Yadav
- Succeeded by: Abhiram Sharma
- Constituency: Jehanabad

Personal details
- Party: Rashtriya Janata Dal
- Occupation: Politician social work

Sachidanand Yadav was an Indian politician who was elected as a member of Bihar Legislative Assembly from Jehanabad constituency in February 2005 and October 2005 as the candidate of Rashtriya Janata Dal.

== See also ==
- Jehanabad Assembly constituency
