= Sahdev Prasad Yadav =

Indian politician

Bihar Legislative Assembly
- In office 1990–1995
- Preceded by: Mudrika Singh Yadav
- Succeeded by: Shiv Bachan Yadav
- Constituency: Kurtha

Personal details
- Born: Vill+Post Kamalpur, Tekari, Gaya, Bihar
- Died: 15 June 2009
- Resting place: Sahdev Prasad Yadav High School Kamalpur, Tekari, Gaya, Bihar
- Party: Janata Dal; Rashtriya Janata Dal
- Parent: Saudagar Yadav (Father)
- Occupation: Agriculturist
- Profession: Politician

Sahdev Prasad Yadav was an Indian politician, an excise minister in the Government of Bihar and a member of Bihar Legislative Assembly of India. He represented the Kurtha constituency in Arwal district of Bihar. He had been a Mukhiya of Chitaukhar-Jalalpur Panchayat for almost 25 years. First he became an MLA (Member of Legislative Assembly) in 1980 while being in Lok Dal party. He was elected in 1995 as a member of Janata Dal. Yadav started his political career in 1957 as an independent candidate from Tikari constituency but lost. Later this constituency named as Konch (Vidhan Sabha constituency), now again becomes Tikari constituency from 2010 onwards. He also fought from here as a candidate of Indian National Congress in 1967 but lost to U. N. Verma of Samyukta Socialist Party and in 1969 lost to Ram Balav Saran Singh.

== Other institutions and monuments ==
- Sahdev Prasad Yadav High School Kamlalpur, Tekari, Gaya, Bihar
- Sahdev Prasad Yadav Balika High School Manikpur Kurtha, Arwal, Bihar
- Sahdev Prasad Yadav College Karpi, Arwal, Bihar
