= Satyabhama Devi =

Indian politician

Member of Parliament, Lok Sabha
- In office 1957–1967
- Preceded by: Maharaj Gopal Sharan Tekari
- Succeeded by: Chandrasekhar Singh
- Constituency: Jahanabad, Bihar

Personal details
- Born: 14 March 1911 Barahiya
- Died: Majhway Estate
- Party: Indian National Congress
- Spouse: Shree Triveni Prasad Singh
- Children: No Children

Satyabhama Devi was an Indian politician. She was elected to the Lok Sabha, the lower house of the Parliament of India from the Jahanabad in Bihar as a member of the Indian National Congress. She donated 5000 bighas(to Vinoba bhabhe) of land in bhoodan movement for the Upliftment of depressed class.
