= Satish Kumar (Bihar politician) =

Indian politician (born 1982)

Member of the Bihar Legislative Assembly
- In office 2020–2025
- Constituency: Makhdumpur Assembly constituency

Personal details
- Born: 1982 (age 43–44) Barachatti, Gaya district, Bihar, India
- Party: Rashtriya Janata Dal
- Parent: Rajendra Kumar Das (father)
- Education: LL.B.
- Occupation: Politician

Satish Kumar (born 1982) is an Indian politician from Bihar. He is a member of the Bihar Legislative Assembly from Makhdumpur Assembly constituency which is reserved for Scheduled Caste community in Jahanabad District. He won the 2020 Bihar Legislative Assembly election representing Rashtriya Janata Dal.

== Early life and education ==
Kumar is from Barachatti, Gaya district, Bihar. He is the son of Rajendra Kumar Das. He completed his L.L.B. in 2009 at Anugrah Memorial Law College, Gaya. Earlier, he passed B.A. in 2005 at S.P.Y. College and intermediate at R.P.S College, Patna.

== Career ==
Kumar won from Makhdumpur Assembly constituency representing Rashtriya Janata Dal in the 2020 Bihar Legislative Assembly election. He polled 71,571 votes and defeated his nearest rival, Devendra Kumar of Hindustani Awam Morcha (Secular), by a margin of 22,565 votes.
