= Ajay Kumar Dangi =

Indian politician

Ajay Kumar popularly known as Ajay Kumar Dangi is an Indian politician and a member of Bihar Legislative Assembly from Tikari Assembly constituency. He is a member of Rashtriya Janata Dal political party. He won the 2025 Bihar Legislative Assembly election to become an MLA for the first time.

== Early life and education ==
Ajay Kumar Dangi was born as Ajay Kumar to Sarayu Mahto.

He graduated in History from William Carey University Shillong Meghalaya in 2016.
