= Ramashray Prasad Singh =

Indian politician

Member of Parliament, Lok Sabha
- In office 1984–1998
- Preceded by: Mahendra Prasad
- Succeeded by: Surendra Prasad Yadav
- Constituency: Jahanabad, Bihar

Personal details
- Born: 25 March 1924 Jehanabad district, Bihar and Orissa Province, British India
- Died: 5 December 2015 (aged 91) Patna, Bihar, India
- Party: Communist Party of India
- Spouse: Monako Devi
- Children: Two sons and six daughters

Ramashray Prasad Singh (25 March 1924 – 5 December 2015) was an Indian politician. He was elected to four terms 6th, 7th, 8th and 9th to the Lok Sabha, the lower house of the Parliament of India from Jahanabad in Bihar as a member of the Communist Party of India, and twice elected member of the Bihar assembly from Ghosi constituency.
