= Ram Chandra Sahis =

Indian politician

Ram Chandra Sahis is an Indian politician and a former Minister from Jharkhand. He is the principal general secretary of the All Jharkhand Students Union. Sahis was a member of the Jharkhand Legislative Assembly from the Jugsalai constituency in East Singhbhum district.
