= Subedar Das =

Member of the Bihar Legislative Assembly
- Incumbent
- Assumed office 14 November 2025
- Preceded by: Satish Kumar
- Constituency: Makhdumpur

Personal details
- Party: Rashtriya Janata Dal
- Profession: Politician

Subedar Das is an Indian politician from Bihar. He was elected as a Member of Legislative Assembly in 2025 Bihar Legislative Assembly election, representing the Makhdumpur constituency. He is a member of the Rashtriya Janata Dal.
