= Shiv Bachan Yadav =

Indian politician

Mahesh Singh Yadav

Member of the Bihar Legislative Assembly
- In office 1995–2000
- Preceded by: Ramashraya Prasad Singh
- Succeeded by: Mahesh Singh Yadav
- Constituency: Tikari
- In office 2000–2005
- Preceded by: Sahdev Prasad Yadav
- Succeeded by: Suchitra Sinha
- Constituency: Kurtha

Personal details
- Party: Janata Dal; Rashtriya Janata Dal
- Parent: Jagdish Yadav (Father)
- Education: Magadh University
- Occupation: Politician; Social work

Shiv Bachan Yadav is an Indian politician from Bihar. He is an MLA from Tikari as well as from Kurtha in Gaya district and Arwal district representing Rashtriya Janata Dal. He won the 2000 Bihar Legislative Assembly election. In 2020 Bihar Legislative Assembly election lost Tikari Assembly constituency as a candidate of Bahujan Samaj Party.
