= Chandeshwar Prasad =

Indian politician and member of the 17th Lok Sabha

Member of Parliament, Lok Sabha
- In office 23 May 2019 – 4 June 2024
- Preceded by: Arun Kumar
- Succeeded by: Surendra Prasad Yadav
- Constituency: Jahanabad, Bihar

National Vice-President of Janata Dal (United)
- Incumbent
- Assumed office 22 April 2026
- National President: Nitish Kumar
- Preceded by: Bashistha Narain Singh

Personal details
- Born: 13 July 1951 (age 75) Nadwan, Patna, Bihar
- Party: Janata Dal (United)
- Other political affiliations: Janata Dal
- Spouse: Lalti Devi

Chandeshwar Prasad is an Indian politician. He was elected to the Lok Sabha, lower house of the Parliament of India from Jahanabad, Bihar, in the 2019 Indian general election as member of the Janata Dal (United).

Chandeshwar Prasad is a native of Nadwan village in the Patna district of Bihar. He was involved in coal business before joining active politics. In 1995, he started his political career with Samata Party. He contested his first assembly election from the Obra Assembly constituency of the Aurangabad district, Bihar in the year 2000.
