= Kurtha =

Village development committee in Janakpur Zone, Nepal

kurtha Kurtha janakpur 21
- Village development committee
- Location in Nepal
- Coordinates: 26.76°N 85.90°E
- Country: Nepal
- Zone: Janakpur Zone
- District: Dhanusa District

Population (2022)
  - Total: 5,985,421
- Time zone: UTC+5:45 (Nepal Time)

Kurtha is a part of Janakpur sub metropolitan city in Dhanusa District in the Janakpur Zone of south-eastern Nepal. At the time of the 2022 Nepal census it had a population of 7,815 persons living in 250000+ individual households. Ramanand Chowk and parade chowk are in the east of Kurtha. Mahadaiya is in the west of Kurtha. Bispitti is in the south of Kurtha. Kurtha is most populated of Dhanusha district.
