= Jagdish Sharma =

Indian politician (born 1950)

Dr. Jagdish Sharma

Member of Parliament – Lok Sabha
- In office 16 May 2009 – 16 May 2014; Member of legislative assembly from ghosi 1977–2009
- Constituency: Jahanabad

Personal details
- Born: 1 October 1950 (age 76) Korra, Jehanabad, Bihar
- Party: Rashtriya Janata Dal present
- Children: 3 (2 Sons & 1 Daughter) Rahul Kumar, Rohit Kumar, Aparna Sharma
- Education: Magadh University and Rajendra Agricultural University
- Occupation: Agriculturist; advocate; ex-MLA; former Member of Parliament

Dr. Jagdish Sharma (born 1 October 1950) is an Indian politician. He was a vice president of the Hindustani Awam Morcha, a political party. His wife Shanti Sharma was MLA from Ghosi. His son Rahul Kumar became MLA from Ghosi constituency. After being found guilty in criminal conspiracy to save bureaucrats involved in Fodder Scam, Sharma was sentenced to four years rigorous imprisonment and disqualified as an MP along with RJD Supremo Lalu Prasad Yadav.

== Political career ==
Sharma entered in politics with the Bihar Movement, also known as JP Movement, led by Jayaprakash Narayan in 1974.

Political roles
Year	Notes
1977–2008	Member, Bihar Legislative Assembly (eight terms)
2009	Elected to 15th Lok Sabha
August 2009	Member, Standing Committee on Rural Development; Member, Consultative Committee, Ministry of Chemical and Fertilizer

== See also ==
- Politics of Bihar
- List of members of the 15th Lok Sabha of India
