= Rituraj Kumar =

Indian politician

Member of the Bihar Legislative Assembly
- Incumbent
- Assumed office 14 November 2025
- Preceded by: Ram Bali Singh Yadav
- Constituency: Ghosi

Personal details
- Party: Janata Dal (United)
- Profession: Politician

Rituraj Kumar is an Indian politician from Bihar. He is elected as a Member of Legislative Assembly in 2025 Bihar Legislative Assembly election from Ghosi constituency.

== Political career ==
Rituraj Kumar won from Ghosi constituency representing Janata Dal (United) in the 2025 Bihar Legislative Assembly election. He polled 80,740 votes and defeated his nearest rival, Ram Bali Singh Yadav of Communist Party of India (Marxist–Leninist) Liberation, by a margin of 11,929 votes.
