= Suryadev Singh =

Indian politician and convicted criminal

Member of the Bihar Legislative Assembly
- In office 1990–1995
- Constituency: Bikramganj Assembly constituency
- In office 1995–2000
- Constituency: Bikramganj Assembly constituency

Personal details
- Party: Indian People's Front; Rashtriya Janata Dal
- Other political affiliations: Janata Dal (United)
- Spouse: Kusum Devi

Suryadev Singh (also known as Suryadev Singh Kushwaha) is a former Indian politician based in Bihar, who was elected to Bihar Legislative Assembly twice from Bikramganj Assembly constituency of Rohtas district. He was first elected to Bihar Legislative Assembly as the candidate of Indian People's Front in 1990 Bihar Legislative Assembly election. Later, he defected to Rashtriya Janata Dal and in a run up to 1995 Bihar Legislative Assembly election, he was again elected to Bihar Legislative Assembly, this time, on the symbol of Rashtriya Janata Dal. Before his retirement from politics, following his conviction in a murder case, he was a member of Janata Dal (United). The Bikramganj Assembly constituency ceased to exist after 2005, after the delimitation of constituencies.

== Life ==
Suryadev Singh is a resident of Rohtas district of Bihar. He was born to Sitaram Singh in Tenduni village of Bikramganj Police Station area. He was one of the three sons of his father, other being, Chandrama Singh and Chandradip Singh. Singh was associated with Indian People's Front, the open mass front of CPI-ML liberation (liberation). He was elected to Bihar Legislative Assembly on the symbol of IPF in 1990. He was one of the pillars of Koeri support base of liberation and author Ranabir Samaddar has written that liberation in Bihar, drew its strength from castes like Koeri and Yadav at the upper echelon of its leadership, with Dalits serving as foot soldiers in large numbers. When Lalu Prasad Yadav became premier of the state of Bihar in the 1990s, many of the Maoist leaders were attracted towards him, being enamoured by thought of sharing power in the democratic set-up of state. Yadav started giving plum posts in Janata Dal and later Rashtriya Janata Dal to such leaders, who were defecting from left wing organisations, having association with class war in the state. In this phase, several leaders of CPI-ML liberation (Indian People's Front) joined Yadav. Suryadev Singh was one such leader, who did so along with four other legislators of liberation, which included Shri Bhagwan Singh Kushwaha, K.D Yadav and Umesh Singh.

In 1995, Singh once again contested Bihar Assembly elections and was elected on the symbol of Rashtriya Janata Dal. This was his second term in the State Assembly.

== Conviction ==
Singh had a land dispute with his relatives in his ancestral village Tenduni. In 2017, a clash happened between him and his relatives, which included his nephew and their supporters. This incident resulted in exchange of bullets. According to media reports, provocation by his wife lead to Singh using arms against the disputants. In this cross fire incident, the bullet hit one minor girl from nearby Muslim inhabited locality, who died. There others suffered from severe injury and were taken to nearby hospital. Singh along with his supporters left the scene fearing backlash from the victim's family.

Following the incident, Janata Dal (United), the party to which Singh was associated then, suspended him from the membership. The ensuing police investigation seized a rifle, a double barrelled gun and an air gun from Singh's residence. Singh and his wife Kusum Devi were arrested along with some of their men later.
