= Anil Kumar (Bihar politician) =

Indian politician

Dr. Anil Kumar
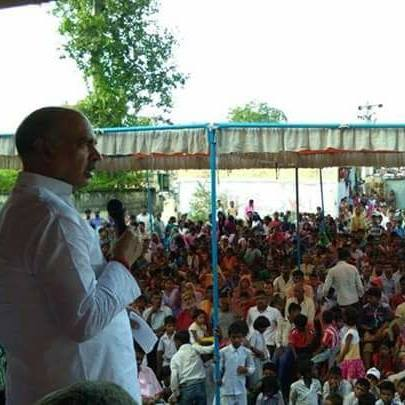
- In office 2005–2015

Bihar Legislative Assembly
- Constituency: Tikari
- In office 2020–2026

Personal details
- Born: 2 August 1960 (age 66) Jehanabad
- Party: HAM (Secular)
- Spouse: Meena Singh
- Children: 1 son, 1 daughter
- Education: Magadh University (PHD)
- Occupation: Member of Legislative Assembly Tekari

Anil Kumar (born 1960) is an Indian politician from Bihar. He currently serves as a Member of Bihar State Implementation Committee ranked as a Deputy Minister in Government of Bihar. He was a member of the Bihar Legislative Assembly from Tikari Assembly constituency and a former Minister of State in the Government of Bihar.

== Early life and education ==
Kumar is from Makhdumpur, Bihar. He is the son of Brajnandan Sharma. He completed his post graduation in 1983 from Patna University. His brother, Arun Kumar, is a former Member of Parliament from Jehanabad.

== Career ==
Kumar is also the State President of HAM (Secular) party headed by Jitan Ram Manjhi, former Chief Minister of Bihar.

Kumar won from Tekari Assembly constituency in the 2010 Bihar Legislative Assembly election representing the Janata Dal (United). Earlier, he won from Konch Assembly constituency in the February 2005 Bihar Legislative Assembly election representing LJP. Assembly was dissolved during the period and a group was formed named break away LJP under the leadership of Narendra Singh state president of LJP. He sought re-election with JDU ticket and won the October 2005 Bihar Legislative Assembly election from Konch Assembly constituency.

Kumar won as an MLA for the fourth time in 2020 Bihar Legislative Assembly election representing BHMS and defeated his nearest rival from Congress Party by 2800 votes.

Earlier, Kumar lost the 1990 Bihar Legislative Assembly election from Makhdumpur Assembly constituency on Janta Dal ticket to Ram Jatan Sinha of Congress Party.

Anil Kumar is also the Bihar State President for HAM (Secular) party headed by Jitan Ram Manjhi.
