= Surendra Prasad Yadav =

Indian politician (born 1959)

Member of Parliament, Lok Sabha
- Incumbent
- Assumed office 4 June 2024
- Preceded by: Chandeshwar Prasad
- In office 10 March 1998 – 26 April 1999
- Preceded by: Ramashray Prasad Singh
- Succeeded by: Arun Kumar
- Constituency: Jahanabad, Bihar

Member of Bihar Legislative Assembly
- In office 1990-1998, 2000-2024
- Preceded by: Abhiram Sharma
- Constituency: Belaganj

GRDA Chairman
- In office 1991–1997

Industrial Minister of Bihar & Jharkhand
- In office 1997–1998

Excise Minister of Bihar
- In office 2000 – 2003; Cabinet Minister in Rabri Devi government

Minister of Co-operative Government of Bihar
- In office 16 August 2022 – 28 January 2024
- Chief Minister: Nitish Kumar
- Preceded by: Subhash Singh
- Succeeded by: Prem Kumar

Personal details
- Born: 2 January 1959 (age 67) Gaya, Bihar, India
- Party: Rashtriya Janata Dal
- Other political affiliations: Janata Dal
- Education: Magadh University

Surendra Prasad Yadav (born 2 January 1959) is an Indian politician from the Rashtriya Janata Dal, and a Member of Parliament representing Jahanabad (Lok Sabha constituency) in Bihar, India and former Member of the Bihar Legislative Assembly. He also served as a member of 12th Lok Sabha of India from Jahanabad (Lok Sabha constituency). He was consecutively elected eight times since 1990 to 2020 in the Bihar Legislative Assembly.

He served as Co-operative Minister of Bihar Government, Minister of Excise, Minister of Industry and very close to Indian politician Lalu Prasad Yadav. According to his election filings he has 9 criminal cases against him.

In 2024 Indian General Election, he won the MP seat of Jahanabad against the JDU leader Chandeshwar Prasad with the margin of 142591 votes.

== Early life and education ==
Surendra Prasad Yadav was born to a family of farmers in Gaya, Bihar. Yadav had his early education in Gaya and has attended Magadh University.

== Political career ==
Surendra Prasad Yadav came in contact with Lalu Prasad Yadav in 1981 when Lalu Prasad Yadav was a member of Lok Dal Party. In 1985, Surendra Prasad Yadav has been given a ticket from Lok Dal Party to contest General Election from Jehanabad parliamentary constituency but he lost it. Later in 1990, he was given a ticket for Bihar Legislative Assembly election from Belaganj constituency and he won.

Yadav repeated his electoral victory in assembly elections and became the member of Bihar Legislative Assembly from Belaganj Assembly constituency eight times. In 1998, he was elected as member of Lok Sabha from Jahanabad Lok Sabha constituency. He defeated Samata Party candidate Arun Kumar in this election. In the year 2024, he was again made a candidate for Lok Sabha polls from Jahanabad Lok Sabha constituency by Rashtriya Janata Dal. He defeated Chandeshwar Prasad of Janata Dal (United) by a margin of 1,42,426 votes and became the member of Indian Parliament (Lok Sabha) for the second time, after a margin of twenty five years.

== Offices held ==
- Member of Advisory Committee of Coal Ministry
- Member of Standing Committee, Industry Ministry of India
- Member of Library Committee, Bihar
- Member of Housing Committee, Bihar
- Member of Request Committee, Bihar

== External ==
- Bihar Legislative Assembly
- Rashtriya Janta Dal
- Official biographical sketch in Parliament of India website
