= Hulasganj =

- Community development block
- Location in Bihar, India
- Coordinates: 25.0835°N 85.1478°E
- Country: India
- State: Bihar
- District: Jehanabad

Languages
  - Official: Magadhi, Hindi
- Time zone: UTC+5:30 (IST)
- ISO 3166 code: IN-BR

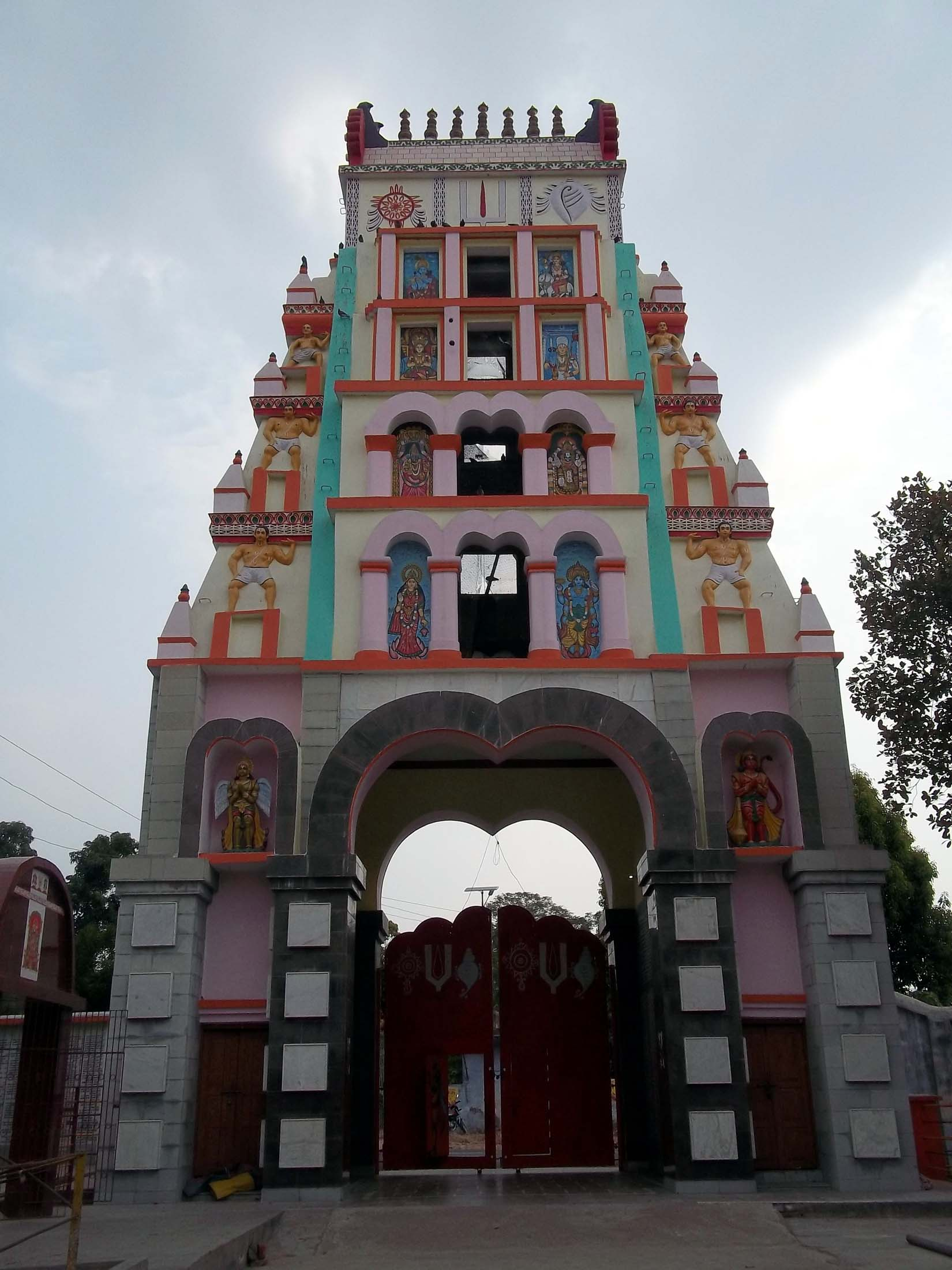
Sri Lakshmi Narayan Temple, Hulasganj

Hulasganj is a block in Jehanabad district of Bihar state, India. The block is situated 20 km east from the district Jehanabad. The place is well connected with Gaya and Patna through road network. This place is famous for its Sanskrit College all over India. Students from all over India come here to get Sanskrit education. The Sanskrit College is operated by Human Resource Department, Govt. of India. Food and lodging is absolutely free for all students. Students of all castes and religion get here Sanskrit education and get placed in Govt. jobs. They are also working as "Purohit" and perform worship for their clients all over India. Students of this 'Sanskrit Vidyalaya' are high in demand as they are known for their fluency in Sanskrit. Hulasganj is rich agricultural producer. In recent time, some renowned educational institutes have come up in existence. Some of them are:' ''

- Swami Prankushacharya Adarsh Sanskrit Mahavidyalya (up to Post Graduation)
- Late Kamta Prasad B. Ed. College, Hulasganj
- Hulasganj Inter College, Hulasganj
- Saraswati Shishu Mandir
- 10+2 High school Hulasganj
- Hulasganj Private ITI
- Manas International School

Hulasganj is a famous pilgrimage place for Hindus, especially Vaishnav Communities. There are lot of temples established by Swami Ji (Shree Swami Parankushacharya). The Credit for developing Hulasganj goes to Hulasganj Ashram, an educational and research hub for Sanskrit.
