= Kumud Verma =

Indian politician

Member of the Bihar Legislative Council
- Incumbent
- Assumed office 29 June 2020
- Constituency: Elected by Legislative Assembly

Personal details
- Born: 13 August 1967 (age 59)
- Party: JDU
- Education: Magadh University
- Profession: Politician

Kumud Verma is an Indian politician from Bihar. She is serving as a member of the Bihar Legislative Council since 29 June 2020. She is a member of the Janata Dal (United)
