= Bagi Kumar Verma =

Indian politician (1948/1949–2026)

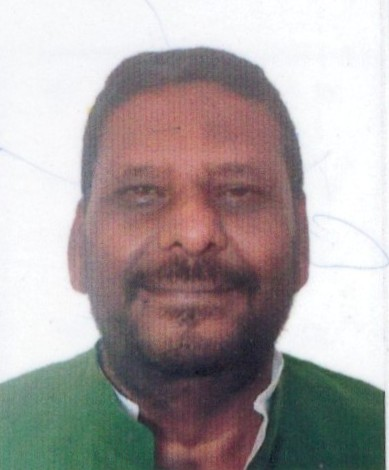

Member of the Bihar Legislative Assembly
- In office 2020–2025
- Constituency: Kurtha
- In office 1995–2005
- Constituency: Makhdumpur

Personal details
- Born: 1948 or 1949
- Died: 11 May 2026 (aged 77) Delhi, India
- Party: Rashtriya Janata Dal
- Other political affiliations: Janata Dal (United)
- Parent: Upendra Nath Verma

Bagi Kumar Verma (1948 or 1949 – 11 May 2026) was an Indian politician from Bihar. He was a member of Bihar Legislative Assembly for three terms, two times from Makhdumpur Assembly constituency and once from Kurtha Assembly constituency. A former minister in Government of Bihar under Lalu Prasad Yadav, Verma was a member of both Rashtriya Janata Dal and Janata Dal (United) at different occasions. In 2020 Bihar Assembly elections, he defeated Satyadev Kushwaha, the two times MLA from Kurtha Assembly to enter Bihar Assembly for his third term.

== Life and career ==
Verma was the son of another Bihar politician Upendra Nath Verma. His younger brother's wife has served as a member of Bihar Legislative Council as a candidate of Janata Dal (United). He contested 2020 Bihar Assembly elections from Kurtha constituency in Arwal district and secured 54227 votes, which was far higher than 26417 votes secured by second runner-up, Satyadev Kushwaha, who was elected previously from this constituency for two terms. Verma had also contested 1995 Bihar Assembly elections from Makhdumpur constituency of Gaya district. He secured 61,143 votes in this election, defeating Ram Jatan Sinha of Indian National Congress. Sinha secured 36,250 votes and got second position. Verma was a member of Janata Dal then. In 2000 Bihar Assembly elections, he again contested, this time as a member of Rashtriya Janata Dal. He defeated Ram Jatan Sinha of Congress once again, who was first runner-up in this election too. Verma secured 62,996 votes, while Sinha got 55,626 votes.

Verma died on 11 May 2026, at the age of 77.
