= Dulal Bhuiyan =

Indian politician

Dulal Bhuiyan is an Indian politician and member of the Jharkhand Mukti Morcha. Bhuiyan is a member of the Jharkhand Legislative Assembly from the Jugsalai constituency in East Singhbhum district in 1995, 2000 and 2005, and also a minister in Jharkhand Government in 2005-2009.
