= Satyadev Kushwaha =

Indian politician

- Constituency: Kurtha

Member of Bihar Legislative Assembly
- In office 2010–2015

Member of Bihar Legislative Assembly
- In office 2015–2020

Personal details
- Born: 20 June 1950 (age 76) Bhilichak, Aurangabad district, Bihar
- Party: Janata Dal (United)
- Spouse: Tinku Devi
- Parent: Ramanand Singh (father)

Satyadev Kushwaha is an Indian politician who is a leader of Janata Dal (United) party and a former member of the Bihar Legislative Assembly. He was elected to the assembly from Kurtha in Arwal district. In 2015 Bihar Legislative Assembly Elections he defeated Ashok Kumar Verma of Rashtriya Lok Samata Party.

== Early life ==
Satyadev Singh alias Satyadev Kushwaha was born to Ramanand Singh on 20 June 1950. His father was an agriculturist by profession. He completed his education from Tekari college Magadh University Bodhgaya. Singh hails from Aurangabad district where his native village Bhimlichak is located. He is active in social work besides politics. Singh has been embroiled in many controversies. In October 2015 he was caught on a video accepting bribe from a businessman.

== Political career ==
Satyadev Singh entered into politics in 1974 and had been associated with several political parties like Lok Dal, Janata Party, Janata Dal, Rashtriya Janata Dal and Janata Dal (United) at different times. In 1984 he was involved in protecting Sikhs residing in Bokaro steel city from the anti-Sikh riots that was followed up after the assassination of Indira Gandhi by her Sikh bodyguards. Satyadev helped to protect life of thousands of Sikh people for which he was later awarded by Sikh society at the Model Town Gurudwara in 1986 at Delhi. He was arrested and tortured by the incumbent government for this. In 1998 he contested the Lok Sabha election on the ticket of Janata Dal from Aurangabad Lok Sabha constituency but was defeated. He later contested the election to Bihar Legislative Assembly in 2010 and won, assuming office from 2010 to 2015. He again successfully contested the Bihar Assembly Elections in 2015 from Kurtha constituency. In the 2015 Assembly Election to Kurtha he received 43,676 votes and defeated his opponent by a large margin. In 2020 Bihar Assembly Election Janata Dal (United) once again made him its candidate from Kurtha while many other sitting MLAs were ousted from the party.

In this election Satyadev was defeated by Bagi Kumar Verma of Rashtriya Janata Dal with a high victory margin.
