= Mudrika Singh Yadav =

Indian politician

Member of Bihar Legislative Assembly
- In office 2015–2017
- Preceded by: Abhiram Sharma
- Succeeded by: Suday Yadav
- Constituency: Jehanabad
- In office 1990–1995
- Preceded by: Nagmani
- Succeeded by: Sahdev Prasad Yadav
- Constituency: Kurtha

Personal details
- Born: Mudrika Singh Yadav Soanbhadra, Karpi, Arwal India
- Died: 24 October 2017 (Age 74) Patna, Bihar
- Party: Rashtriya Janata Dal
- Children: Suday Yadav
- Education: B.A., Gaya College, Magadh University
- Profession: Politician, Agriculturist

Mudrika Singh Yadav was a senior most leader of the Rashtriya Janata Dal from Bihar. He was the Principal General Secretary of RJD. He had served in the Lalu Prasad Yadav ministry as Health minister. He was elected to Bihar Vidhan Sabha from Jehanabad in 2015 as a member of Rashtriya Janata Dal and from Kurtha as a member of Janata Dal in 1990. Yadav died on 24 October 2017 due to a head injury as well as dengue in Patna.
