= Suday Yadav =

Indian politician

Member of Bihar Legislative Assembly
- In office 2018–2025
- Preceded by: Mudrika Singh Yadav
- Succeeded by: Rahul Kumar
- Constituency: Jehanabad

Personal details
- Party: Rashtriya Janata Dal
- Occupation: Politician

Suday Yadav is an Indian politician from Bihar and a Member of the Bihar Legislative Assembly. He won the Jehanabad constituency after the death of his father Mudrika Singh Yadav in 2018 and was also elected to 2020 assembly.
