= Ram Chandra Yadav (Bihar politician) =

Indian politician

Member of the Bihar Legislative Assembly
- In office 1951–1962
- Preceded by: Position established
- Succeeded by: Mithileshwar Prasad Singh
- Constituency: Ghosi
- In office 1977–1980
- Preceded by: Mahabir Chaudhary
- Succeeded by: Tara Gupta
- Constituency: Jehanabad

Personal details
- Party: Janata Party; Independent
- Occupation: Politician social work

Ram Chandra Yadav was an Indian politician who was elected as a member of Bihar Legislative Assembly from Ghosi constituency in 1951 as the Independent candidate and in 1977 elections he won from Jehanabad constituency as the candidate of Janata Party.

== See also ==
- Ghosi, Bihar Assembly constituency
- Jehanabad Assembly constituency
