= Tikari Assembly constituency =

Assembly constituency in Bihar, India

Coordinates: 24.94°N 84.84°E

Tikari
- Constituency No. 231 for the Bihar Legislative Assembly

Constituency details
- Country: India
- Region: East India
- State: Bihar
- District: Gaya
- Lok Sabha constituency: Aurangabad
- Established: 1951
- Reservation: None

Member of Legislative Assembly
- 18th Bihar Legislative Assembly
- Incumbent Ajay Kumar Dangi
- Party: RJD
- Alliance: MGB
- Elected year: 2025

Tikari is a constituency of the Bihar Legislative Assembly in Bihar, India. It comprises the Konch and Tekari CD Blocks in Gaya district and comes under Aurangabad Lok Sabha constituency. As of 2020, its representative is Anil Kumar of the Hindustani Awam Morcha party.

== Members of the Legislative Assembly ==
Year	Member	Party
2010	Anil Kumar	Janata Dal (United)
2015	Abhay Kushwaha	Janata Dal (United)
2020	Anil Kumar	Hindustani Awam Morcha
2025	Ajay Kumar Dangi	Rashtriya Janata Dal

== Election results ==
=== 2025 ===
2025 Bihar Legislative Assembly election: Tikari
Party	Candidate	Votes	%	±%
RJD	Ajay Kumar Dangi	97,550	45.79	
HAM(S)	Anil Kumar	95,492	44.83	+7.14
Independent	Subodh Kumar Singh	3,730	1.75	
BSP	Uday Paswan	2,807	1.32	−2.59
JSP	Shashi Kumar	2,552	1.2	
Independent	Munna Kumar	2,170	1.02	
NOTA	None of the above	4,268	2.0	+1.37
Majority		2,058	0.96	−0.45
Turnout		213,025	70.31	+10.15
RJD gain from HAM(S)		Swing		

=== 2020 ===
2020 Bihar Legislative Assembly election: Tikari
Party	Candidate	Votes	%	±%
HAM(S)	Anil Kumar	70,359	37.69	+5.01
INC	Sumant Kumar	67,729	36.28	
LJP	Kamlesh Sharma	16,385	8.78	
BSP	Shiv Bachan Yadav	7,296	3.91	+2.32
BJKD (D)	Ravish Kumar Raj	2,872	1.54	
JAP(L)	Ajay Yadav	2,397	1.28	
Shoshit Samaj Dal	Punam Kumari	2,370	1.27	+0.68
Aam Janta Party Rashtriya	Santosh Kumar	2,075	1.11	
NOTA	None of the above	1,171	0.63	−3.87
Majority		2,630	1.41	−17.43
Turnout		186,667	60.16	+0.17
HAM(S) gain from JD(U)		Swing		

=== 2015 ===
2015 Bihar Legislative Assembly election: Tikari
Party	Candidate	Votes	%	±%
JD(U)	Abhay Kumar Sinha	86,975	51.52	
HAM(S)	Anil Kumar	55,162	32.68	
SS	Arun Kumar Singh	5,927	3.51	
Independent	Archana Devi	2,702	1.6	
BSP	Amit Kumar	2,682	1.59	
Independent	Bhola Paswan	1,826	1.08	
NOTA	None of the above	7,604	4.5	
Majority		31,813	18.84	
Turnout		168,816	59.99	
