= Jehanabad district =

District in Bihar, India

- District of Bihar
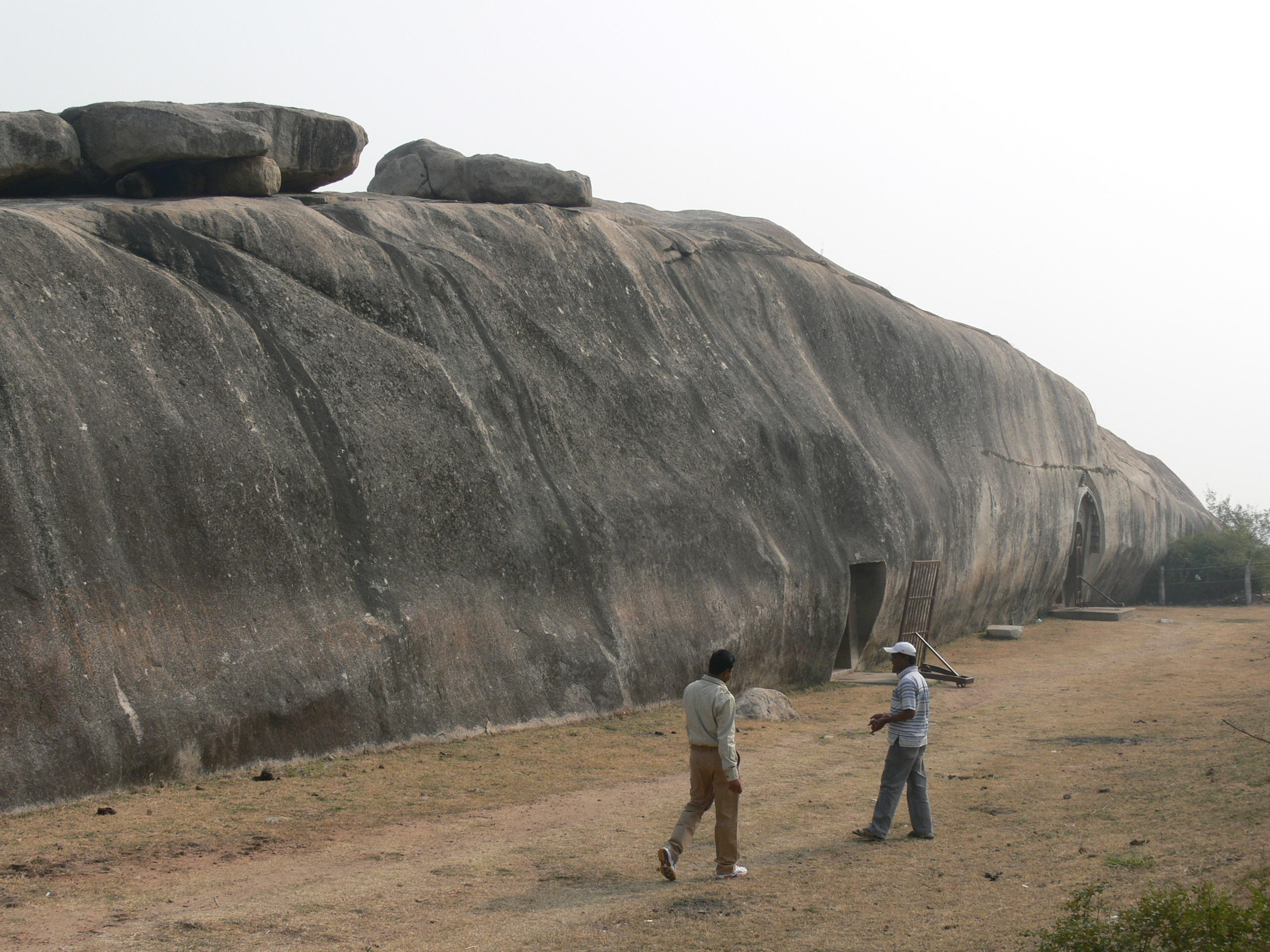
- Barabar Caves
- Interactive map of Jehanabad district
- Country: India
- State: Bihar
- Division: Magadh
- Headquarters: Jehanabad

Government
  - Lok Sabha constituencies: Jahanabad

Area
  - Total: 932 km^{2} (360 sq mi)

Population (2011)
  - Total: 1,125,313
  - Density: 1,210/km^{2} (3,130/sq mi)

Demographics
  - Sex ratio: 918
- Time zone: UTC+05:30 (IST)
- PIN: 8044xx (Jehanabad)
- Major highways: NH 83
- Average annual precipitation: 1074 mm
- Website: https://jehanabad.nic.in/en/

Jehanabad district is one of the thirty-eight districts of Bihar state, India. Jehanabad town is the administrative headquarters of this district. Jehanabad district is a part of Magadh Division, and is located on the confluence of two small rivers called Dardha and Yamunaiya.

== History ==
The territory of the present-day district became Jehanabad sub-division of Gaya district in 1872. The district came into existence on 1 August 1986. It is surrounded by Patna in north, Arwal in west, Nalanda in east and Gaya in south.

== Geography & Climate ==
Jehanabad lies in the southern Gangetic Plain. Elevation is low and flat; the district headquarters at Jehanabad town sits near the confluence of the Dardha and Jamuna rivers. The climate is humid subtropical (monsoon-influenced): summers are very hot (up to ~44 °C) and winters cool (down to ~5 °C). The southwest monsoon (June–September) brings most rain (roughly 1,100–1,300 mm annually). Spring and autumn are brief transitional seasons. The soil is broadly fertile alluvial loam. These conditions favor intensive cultivation; however, irrigation depends on monsoon rains and local tube wells (groundwater), since most rivers (Dardha, Phalgu, etc.) are seasonal.

Vegetation is that of the Indo-Gangetic plains (agricultural fields, patches of scrub or sal on higher ground). The landscape is largely cleared for farming; forest cover in the district is negligible.

== Demographics ==
Historical population
Year	Pop.	±% p.a.
1901	237,802	—
1911	249,238	+0.47%
1921	248,306	−0.04%
1931	275,471	+1.04%
1941	320,093	+1.51%
1951	354,133	+1.02%
1961	415,062	+1.60%
1971	495,614	+1.79%
1981	599,143	+1.92%
1991	709,862	+1.71%
2001	926,489	+2.70%
2011	1,125,313	+1.96%

Religions in Jehanabad district (2011)
Religion	Percent
Hindus	92.87%
Muslims	6.73%
Other or not stated	0.40%

According to the 2011 census Jehanabad district has a population of 1,125,313, roughly equal to the nation of Cyprus or the US state of Rhode Island. This gives it a ranking of 412th in India (out of a total of 640). The district has a population density of 1,206 inhabitants per square kilometre (3,120/sq mi). Its population growth rate over the decade 2001–2011 was 21.34%. Jehanabad has a sex ratio of 918 females for every 1000 males, and a literacy rate of 78.27%. 12.01% of the population lives in urban areas. Scheduled Castes and Scheduled Tribes make up 19.81% and 0.11% of the population respectively.

Languages in Jehanabad district (2011)
1. Magahi (79.5%)
2. Hindi (18.0%)
3. Urdu (2.00%)
4. Others (0.16%)

At the time of the 2011 Census of India, 79.5% of the population in the district spoke Magahi, 18.01% Hindi and 2.00% Urdu as their first language.

== Politics ==
District	No.	Constituency	Name	Party	Alliance	Remarks
Jehanabad	216	Jehanabad	Rahul Sharma	RJD	MGB	
Jehanabad	217	Ghosi	Rituraj Kumar	JD(U)	NDA	
Jehanabad	218	Makhdumpur (SC)	Subedar Das	RJD	MGB	

== Administrative units ==
Sl. no.	Name of the Gram Panchayats	Name of the Blocks	No. of Gram Panchayats
1	Ammain	Jehanabad	14
2	Kalpa	Jehanabad	14
3	Kinari	Jehanabad	14
4	Gonwa	Jehanabad	14
5	Jamuk	Jehanabad	14
6	Nauru	Jehanabad	14
7	Pandui	Jehanabad	14
8	Muther	Jehanabad	14
9	Mandil	Jehanabad	14
10	Mande Bigaha	Jehanabad	14
11	Larsa	Jehanabad	14
12	SurangaparBhavanichak	Jehanabad	14
13	Sewanan	Jehanabad	14
14	Sikariya	Jehanabad	14
15	Ahiasa	Ghosi	10
16	Uber	Ghosi	10
17	Kurre	Ghosi	10
18	Gopalpur	Ghosi	10
19	Ghosi	Ghosi	10
20	Parawan	Ghosi	10
21	Bharthu	Ghosi	10
22	Lakhawar	Ghosi	10
23	Shahpur	Ghosi	10
24	Saho Bigaha	Ghosi	10
25	Amathua	Kako	16
26	Uttar Sherthua	Kako	16
27	Khalispur	Kako	16
28	Dedhsaiya	Kako	16
29	Damuha	Kako	16
30	Nerthua	Kako	16
31	Nonhi	Kako	16
32	Purbi Kako	Kako	16
33	Paschimi Kako	Kako	16
34	Pinjaura	Kako	16
35	Badauna	Kako	16
36	Barawa	Kako	16
37	Bara	Kako	16
38	Maniawa	Kako	16
39	Saidabad	Kako	16
40	Sulemanpur	Kako	16
41	Kachnawa	Makhdumpur	22
42	Kamardiha	Makhdumpur	22
43	Kalanour	Makhdumpur	22
44	Kohra	Makhdumpur	22
45	Chhariyari	Makhdumpur	22
46	Jagapura	Makhdumpur	22
47	Jamanganj	Makhdumpur	22
48	Dakra	Makhdumpur	22
49	Dharnaee	Makhdumpur	22
50	Dharauphat	Makhdumpur	22
51	Punahda	Makhdumpur	22
52	Purvi Saren	Makhdumpur	22
53	Paschimi Saren	Makhdumpur	22
54	Bhaikh	Makhdumpur	22
55	Makarpur	Makhdumpur	22
56	Manjhaous	Makhdumpur	22
57	Malathi	Makhdumpur	22
58	Rampur	Makhdumpur	22
59	Bela Birra	Makhdumpur	22
60	Sugaon	Makhdumpur	22
61	Sumera	Makhdumpur	22
62	Solhanda	Makhdumpur	22
63	Gandhar	Modnaganj	8
64	Jaitipur	Modnaganj	8
65	Dewara	Modnaganj	8
66	Naima	Modnaganj	8
67	Bandhuganj	Modnaganj	8
68	Modnaganj Govindpur	Modnaganj	8
69	Vishnupur Okari	Modnaganj	8
70	Saistabad	Modnaganj	8
71	Uchita	Ratnifaridpur	14
72	Kansua	Ratnifaridpur	14
73	Kaswan	Ratnifaridpur	14
74	Jhunathi	Ratnifaridpur	14
75	Nehalpur	Ratnifaridpur	14
76	Narayanpur	Ratnifaridpur	14
77	Noama	Ratnifaridpur	14
78	Pandaul	Ratnifaridpur	14
79	Murhera	Ratnifaridpur	14
80	Ratni	Ratnifaridpur	14
81	Lakhapur	Ratnifaridpur	14
82	Sesamba	Ratnifaridpur	14
83	Sikandarpur	Ratnifaridpur	14
84	Sohraiya	Ratnifaridpur	14
85	Keuafar	Hulasganj	9
86	Kokarsa	Hulasganj	9
87	Khadauri	Hulasganj	9
88	Chiri	Hulasganj	9
89	Tirra	Hulasganj	9
90	Dawathu	Hulasganj	9
91	Bauri	Hulasganj	9
92	Murgaon	Hulasganj	9
93	Surajpur	Hulasganj	9
Total number of Gram Panchayats			93

- Number of Revenue Division(s)- 1
- Number of Blocks- 7
- Number of Police Stations- 12
- Number of Gram Panchayats- 93
- Number of Census Villages- 584
- Number of Municipalities- 2
- Number of Municipal Corporation- 1

See also - Literacy In Bihar

== Notable people ==
- Samprada Singh (1925–2019) – Born in Okri village (Modanganj block), Jehanabad, he was the co-founder of Alkem Laboratories, one of India’s largest pharmaceutical companies. Coming from a small farming family, Dr. S. N. (Samprada) Singh built Alkem into a multi-thousand-crore enterprise and was a noted philanthropist. (The official Alkem website notes: “Mr. Singh was born … in Okri village of Jehanabad district”.)
- Jagdev (Jagdeo) Prasad (1922–1974) – A socialist leader and reformer, born in Kurtha sub-division, Jehanabad. He founded the Shoshit Dal and fought for OBC/Dalit rights in Bihar, even briefly becoming Deputy Chief Minister in 1968. Jagdev Prasad is celebrated by some as the “Lenin of Bihar” for his role in mobilizing backward classes.
