= Jehanabad =

- City
- Nickname: Jahana
- Location within Bihar
- Coordinates: 25°12′45″N 84°59′07″E
- Country: India
- State: Bihar
- District: Jehanabad

Government
  - Type: Nagar Parishad
  - Body: Jehanabad Municipal Council

Population (2011)
  - Total: 103,282

Languages
  - Official: Magahi, Hindi
- Time zone: UTC+5:30 (IST)
- PIN: 804408
- ISO 3166 code: IN-BR
- Vehicle registration: BR-25
- Website: https://www.jehanabad.nic.in

Jehanabad is a town and a municipal council in the Indian state of Bihar. It serves as the administrative headquarters of Jehanabad district. Jehanabad was separated from Gaya and became a district on August 1, 1986. According to the 2011 Census of India, the town had a population of 103,202. Jehanabad lies on the Patna–Gaya corridor and is connected by both road and rail; Jehanabad railway station serves the town and provides regular connectivity to Patna, Gaya and other cities.

== Demographics ==
According to the 2011 Census of India, Jehanabad town had a population of 103,202. Males constituted approximately 53% of the population and females about 47%. The effective literacy rate of the town was higher than the Bihar state average.

In terms of religion, Hindus form the majority of the population, while Muslims constitute a significant minority community in the town, according to Census 2011 data. Smaller numbers of people follow other religions.

== Transport ==
Jehanabad is situated on the Patna–Gaya railway line and is served by Jehanabad railway station. Road connectivity is provided through the Patna–Gaya highway and district roads linking nearby towns and villages. The nearest major airport is Jay Prakash Narayan International Airport in Patna.

== Economy ==
The town functions as the administrative and commercial centre of the surrounding agricultural district. The local economy is supported by retail markets, small businesses, service providers, and agro-based activities.

== Education ==
Jehanabad has several government and private educational institutions, including primary and secondary schools, higher secondary schools, undergraduate colleges, teacher training institutes, and technical and vocational institutions serving the town and nearby rural areas.
