= List of people from Patna =

This is a list of notable residents of the Indian city of Patna (formerly Pataliputra), Bihar.

== Historical ==
- Aryabhata, mathematician-astronomer
- Ashoka, Indian emperor of the Maurya Dynasty
- Shad Azimabadi, 18th- and 19th-century poet
- Chanakya, teacher, philosopher, and royal advisor
- Ali Ibrahim Khan, 18th-century statesmen and poet
- Dean Mahomed (1759–1851), British Indian traveller, soldier, surgeon, and entrepreneur
- Chandragupta Maurya, founder of the Mauryan Empire
- Samudragupta, second ruler of the Gupta Dynasty
- Bhai Jiwan Singh, Sikh General and friend of Guru Gobind Singh
- Guru Gobind Singh, tenth of the ten Sikh Gurus
- Moggaliputta-Tissa, Buddhist monk and scholar
- Sheikh Zainuddin, 18th-century painter

== Nationalists and independence activists ==
- Syed Abuzar Bukhari, prominent figure of the freedom movement of undivided India; Pakistani Muslim scholar, orator, poet, writer, former president of Majlis-e Ahrar-e Islam
- Bindeshwari Dubey, freedom fighter and former chief minister of Bihar
- Ram Dulari Sinha, Freedom Fighter, Former Union Minister and Former Governor. She has also represented Patna Lok Sabha in 1962 and her house is located in Nageshwar Colony where her son Dr. Madhurendra Kumar Singh, senior leader of Congress lives along with his family
- K. P. Jayaswal, also a historian and lawyer
- Shah Ozair Munemi, independence activist
- Jayaprakash Narayan, independence activist, social reformer and political leader
- K. B. Sahay, former chief minister of unified Bihar
- Jagannath Sarkar, leader, freedom fighter, and writer
- Yogendra Shukla, nationalist and freedom fighter
- Thakur Ramapati Singh, freedom fighter, politician, former MLA and Minister of Bihar, former member of Parliament
- Indradeep Sinha, freedom fighter and communist leader
- Tarkeshwari Sinha, had active role in the Quit India Movement

== Writers and scholars ==
- Muhammad Shams-ul-Haq Azimabadi, Islamic scholar
- HMJ Sir Khan Bahadur Khuda Bakhsh, Persian, Arabic and Hindustani scholar; founder of the Khuda Bakhsh Oriental Library
- Abdul-Qādir Bīdel, representative of Persian poetry and Sufism in India and Central Asia
- Syed Ata Ullah Shah Bukhari, Islamic Hanafi Deobandi scholar
- Bhabatosh Datta, economist, academic and writer
- Talib Jauhari, Pakistani Islamic scholar, religious leader
- Acharya Kishore Kunal, retired Indian Police Service officer and Sanskrit scholar
- Sulaiman Nadvi, historian, biographer, litterateur and scholar of Islam
- Ram Avatar Sharma, Sanskrit scholar and academic
- Ram Karan Sharma, Sanskrit poet and scholar
- R. K. Sinha, English scholar
- Hrishikesh Sulabh, Hindi writer
- Siyaram Tiwari, Hindi scholar and author
- Raza Naqvi Wahi, Urdu-language poet; known for Tanz-o-Mazah Shayari

== Writers ==
- Anurag Anand
- Satinath Bhaduri, novelist and politician
- Hetukar Jha, writer, professor, researcher, and Fulbright scholar
- Saurav Jha, writer
- Kalanath Mishra
- Sahajanand Saraswati
- Vikram Seth, novelist and poet

== Holders of high constitutional offices ==
- HMJ Sir Khan Bahadur Khuda Bakhsh, former Chief Justice of Hyderabad State, Founder of khuda bakhsh oriental library
- Abdul Ghafoor, former chief minister of Bihar
- Anugrah Narayan Sinha, first Deputy Chief Minister of Bihar
- Arun Singh, former union minister of state for defence in the Government of India
- Ashok Sekhar Ganguly, industry expert and former chairman of Hindustan Lever, former member of Rajya Sabha
- Bali Ram Bhagat, former speaker of Lok Sabha
- Balmiki Prasad Singh, 14th Governor of Sikkim
- Bhuvaneshwar Prasad Sinha, 6th Chief Justice of India
- Bidhan Chandra Roy, second chief minister of West Bengal
- Dilip Sinha, Ambassador and Permanent Representative of India to United Nations in Geneva
- Dinesh Nandan Sahay, former Governor of Tripura and Governor of Chhattisgarh
- Hamoodur Rahman, seventh Chief Justice of Pakistan
- Lalit Mohan Sharma, 24th Chief Justice of India
- Lieutenant General (Retd.) Srinivas Kumar Sinha, former Governor of the states of Jammu & Kashmir and Assam
- Mohammad Yunus, first Prime Minister (Premier) of Bihar province in British India
- Muni Lall, minister of state for labour and employment in Third Vajpayee Ministry
- Nikhil Kumar, former governor of Nagaland and Governor of Kerala
- Nitish Mishra, former Minister of the Department of Rural Development, Government of Bihar
- Ram Dulari Sinha, former Union Minister and former Governor of Kerala
- R. N. Ravi, Governor of Tamil Nadu and former deputy NSA of India
- Shyam Saran, former foreign secretary, Government of India
- Tejendra Khanna, former lieutenant governor of Delhi

== Politicians ==
=== CM of Bihar ===
- Krishna Ballabh Sahay, Former Chief Minister of Bihar
- Mahamaya Prasad Sinha, Former Chief Minister of Bihar, Former MP Patna

=== Central Cabinet Minister ===
- Yashwant Sinha, former finance minister of India
- Ravi Shankar Prasad, Ex-Cabinet Minister in Narendra Modi Ministry, Member of Parliament, Patna Sahib
- Shatrughan Sinha, Member of Parliament, Asansol, Ex-Member of Parliament Patna Sahib, Former Cabinet Minister in Third Vajpayee Ministry
- Rita Verma, former Minister of State of Mines and Minerals in the Indian government

=== Other ===
- Sarangdhar Sinha Former MP of Patna
- Ramavatar Shastri Former MP of Patna
- Kiran Ghai, national vice president of the Bharatiya Janata Party
- Syed Hasan Imam, former president of the Indian National Congress
- Madan Prasad Jaiswal, founding member of the Bharatiya Janata Party, former member of Parliament
- Ashok Kumar, Bihar MLA
- Putul Kumari, former member of Parliament
- Sushil Kumar Modi, former deputy chief minister and finance minister of Bihar
- Digvijay Narain Singh, former member of Parliament
- Ganesh Prasad Singh, former member of Parliament
- Ganga Sharan Singh (Sinha), former member of Parliament
- Rajiv Ranjan Singh, former member of Parliament
- Shyama Singh, former member of Parliament
- Uday Singh, former member of Parliament
- Nitin Nabin, Cabinet Minister in Ninth Nitish ministry
- Ram Kripal Yadav, member of Parliament
- Ranjan Prasad Yadav, former member of Parliament
- Arun Kumar Sinha, MLA Kumhrar
- Baba Siddique, Member of Legislative Assembly in Maharashtra
- Vishwajeet Kumar (politician), Former National General Secretary AISF

== Entertainment ==
- Imtiaz Ali, film director, actor and writer
- Manoj Bajpayee, actor
- Prasun Banerjee, singer
- Nitu Chandra, actress
- Sandeep Das, tabla player and composer
- Amardeep Jha, film actress and television personality
- Kranti Prakash Jha, Bollywood film actor
- Pankaj Jha, television actor and painter
- Prakash Jha, filmmaker
- Kabeer Kaushik, Bollywood film director and screenwriter
- Rajesh Kumar, television actor
- Vineet Kumar, actor
- Daler Mehndi, singer
- Sanjai Mishra, comedian and film actor
- Anando Mukerjee, opera singer
- Suhasini Mulay, actress
- Chhavi Pandey, television and film actress and singer
- Pranati Rai Prakash, winner of India's Next Top Model 2016 edition; a finalist of Miss India 2015
- Pariva Pranati, actress
- Sushant Singh Rajput, theater, television and film actor
- Bijoya Ray, filmmaker
- Roshan Seth, British actor
- Abhimanyu Singh, actor
- Anshuman Singh, actor
- Mika Singh, singer, composer, performer and songwriter
- Manjul Sinha, television director
- Poonam Sinha, actress
- Prachi Sinha, Bollywood actress
- Shatrughan Sinha, actor and member of parliament
- Sonakshi Sinha, actress
- Shekhar Suman, film actor and television personality
- Siyaram Tiwari, classical singer
- Pankaj Tripathi, actor

== Visual arts ==
- Subodh Gupta, painter
- Pranava Prakash, pop artist, installation artist
- Shambhavi Singh, painter

== Sports ==
- Subroto Banerjee, cricketer
- Kunal Datta, cricketer
- Saba Karim, cricketer
- Ishan Kishan, cricketer
- Ashish Sinha, cricketer
- Moin-ul-Haq, former general secretary, Indian Olympic Association
- Christopher Oldfield, cricketer
- Veer Pratap Singh, cricketer

== Bureaucracy ==
- Abhayanand, Bihar Director General of Police; educationalist
- S. K. Majumdar, Indian Air Force officer
- Prasun Mukherjee, former commissioner of police in the Kolkata Police department
- N. K. Singh, former Indian Administrative Service officer and now member of Parliament
- Jyoti Kumar Sinha, former director general of the Central Reserve Police Force and former special secretary of the Research and Analysis Wing (RAW)

== Businesspeople ==
- Ravindra Kishore Sinha, Founder of Security and Intelligence Services
- Anil Agarwal, founder and executive chairman of the United Kingdom-based Vedanta Resources PLC
- Iqbal Z. Ahmed, Pakistani businessman and philanthropist

== Journalists ==
- Amitava Kumar, journalist and academic
- Ravish Kumar, works at the NDTV
- Robert Loughnan, New Zealand farmer, journalist and politician
- Mammen Mathew, works at the Hindustan Times
- Nivedita Jha, journalist and women's rights activist

== Scientists ==
- Gopal Prasad Sinha, neurologist, politician, member of the Institutional Ethical Committee of the Indian Council of Medical Research
- Amita Das, physicist
- Shaibal Gupta, social scientist; founder member-secretary of the Asian Development Research Institute
- A. A. Khan, physicist
- Anand Kumar, mathematician; founding member of Super 30
- Sanjaya Lall, development economist
- Shahn Majid, mathematician and theoretical physicist
- Bindeshwar Pathak, sociologist
- Tathagat Avatar Tulsi, physicist

== Doctors ==
- Vinay Kumar – Psychiatrist and former president of the Indian Psychiatric Society

== Others ==
- Gauri Ayyub, social worker, activist, writer and teacher
- Syed Ata-ul-Muhaimin Bukhari, Pakistani; president of Majlis-e Ahrar-e Islam
- Syed Ata-ul-Mohsin Bukhari, leader of Majlis-e Ahrar-e Islam
- Creighton Carvello, British mnemonist
- Papiya Ghosh, historian and professor
- Sujoy K. Guha, biomedical engineer
- Faz Husain, pizza shop owner, Muslim community leader, and politician
- Sake Dean Mahomed, traveller, surgeon and entrepreneur
- Makhdoom Yahya Maneri, Sufi saint
- Manish Mehrotra, award-winning chef
- Marshall D. Moran, American Jesuit priest, missionary
- Mukesh Hissariya, blood donation activist and social worker
- Ashutosh Mukherjee, educator
- Narendra Kumar Pandey, Padma Shri awardee (2014), medical surgeon, founder of the Asian Institute of Medical Sciences
- Brajkishore Prasad, lawyer
- Ram Sharan Sharma, historian and academic
- Pravrajika Shraddhaprana, third president of Sri Sarada Math
- T. Sher Singh, lawyer
- Ratan Kumar Sinha, chairman of the Atomic Energy Commission of India
- Subhav Sinha, innovator
- Nidhi Yasha, costume designer

== See also ==
- List of people from Bihar
