= Road Construction Department (Bihar) =

Indian state government

- पथ निर्माण विभाग

Agency overview
- Jurisdiction: State of Bihar
- Headquarters: Vishweshwaraiya Bhawan, Bailey Road, Patna-15; 25.60716°N 85.11574°E
- Minister responsible: Kumar Shailendra, Road Construction Minister
- Agency executive: Pankaj Kumar Pal, Secretary
- Website: state.bihar.gov.in/rcd

The Road Construction Department (Hindi: पथ निर्माण विभाग) is a department of Government of Bihar.

== Ministers ==
#	Portrait	Name	Constituency	Tenure			Assembly	Chief Minister	Party
		Furqan Ansari		25 March 2000	15 November 2000		12th	Rabri Devi	Indian National Congress
		Nand Kishore Yadav	Patna East	24 November 2005	13 April 2008	2 years, 141 days	14th	Nitish Kumar	Bharatiya Janata Party
		Prem Kumar	Gaya Town	13 April 2008	26 November 2010	2 years, 227 days	14th	Nitish Kumar	Bharatiya Janata Party
		Nand Kishore Yadav	Patna Sahib	26 November 2010	16 June 2013	2 years, 202 days	15th	Nitish Kumar	Bharatiya Janata Party
		Nitish Kumar	MLC	16 June 2013	20 May 2014	338 days	15th	himself	Janata Dal (United)
		Jitan Ram Manjhi	Makhdumpur	20 May 2014	2 June 2014	13 days	15th	himself	Janata Dal (United)
		Lalan Singh	MLC	2 June 2014	22 February 2015	1 year, 171 days	15th	Jitan Ram Manjhi	Janata Dal (United)
		Lalan Singh	MLC	22 February 2015	20 November 2015	1 year, 171 days	15th	Nitish Kumar	Janata Dal (United)
		Tejashwi Yadav	Raghopur	20 November 2015	27 July 2017	1 year, 249 days	16th	Nitish Kumar	Rashtriya Janata Dal
		Nand Kishore Yadav	Patna Sahib	29 July 2017	16 November 2020	3 years, 110 days	16th	Nitish Kumar	Bharatiya Janata Party
		Mangal Pandey	MLC	16 November 2020	9 February 2021	85 days	17th	Nitish Kumar	Bharatiya Janata Party
		Nitin Nabin	Bankipur	9 February 2021	10 August 2022	1 year, 182 days	17th	Nitish Kumar	Bharatiya Janata Party
		Tejashwi Yadav	Raghopur	10 August 2022	28 January 2024	1 year, 171 days	17th	Nitish Kumar	Rashtriya Janata Dal
		Vijay Sinha	Lakhisarai	28 January 2024	26 February 2025	1 year, 29 days	17th	Nitish Kumar	Bharatiya Janata Party
		Nitin Nabin	Bankipur	26 February 2025	20 November 2025	1 year, 232 days	17th	Nitish Kumar	Bharatiya Janata Party
		Nitin Nabin	Bankipur	20 November 2025	16 December 2025	1 year, 232 days	18th	Nitish Kumar	Bharatiya Janata Party
		Dilip Jaiswal	MLC	16 December 2025	14 April 2026	119 days	18th	Nitish Kumar	Bharatiya Janata Party
		Kumar Shailendra	Bihpur	08 May 2025	Incumbent	161 days	18th	Samrat Choudhary	Bharatiya Janata Party

== See also ==
- Energy Department (Bihar)
- Revenue and Land Reforms Department (Bihar)
