= Patna Sahib Lok Sabha constituency =

Lok Sabha Constituency in Bihar

Coordinates: 25.596°N 85.230°E

Patna Sahib
- Lok Sabha constituency

Constituency details
- Country: India
- Region: East India
- State: Bihar
- Assembly constituencies: Bakhtiarpur; Digha; Bankipur; Kumhrar; Patna Sahib; Fatuha
- Established: 2008
- Total electors: 21,42,842

Member of Parliament
- 18th Lok Sabha
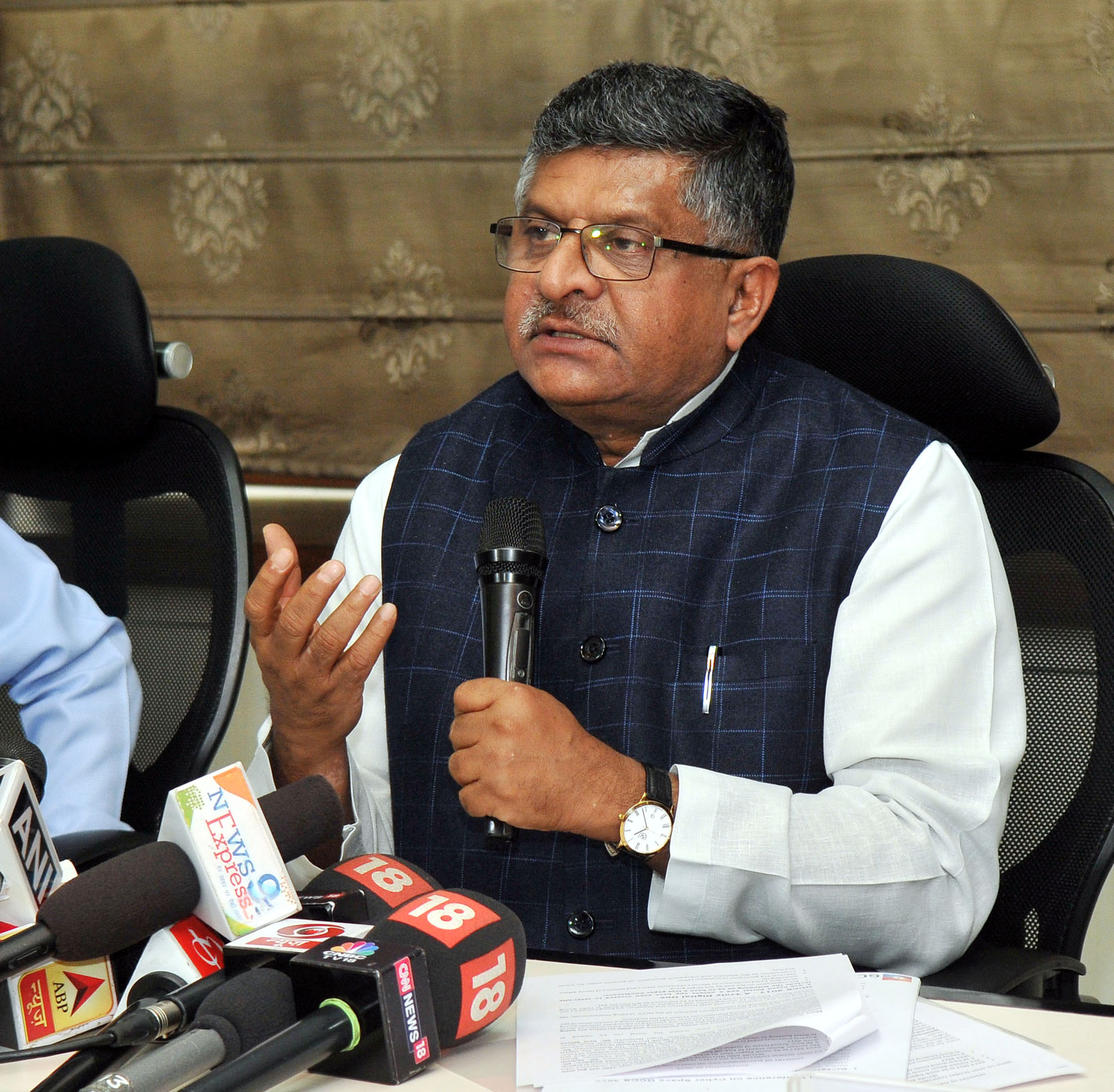
- Incumbent Dr. Ravi Shankar Prasad
- Party: BJP
- Alliance: NDA
- Elected year: 2024
- Preceded by: Shatrughan Sinha

Patna Sahib is one of the 543 parliamentary constituencies in India. The constituency is located in Patna district in Bihar. Until 2008, there was only one Lok Sabha seat for Patna, capital of Bihar. In the reorganisation effected that year, the city was awarded two seats, named Pataliputra (after the city's ancient name) and Patna Sahib. It also shares border with Munger Lok Sabha constituency. This Loksabha Constituency and this seat is dominated by Kayastha Caste. The Voter-verified paper audit trail (VVPAT) system with EVMs was used for the first time in this Lok Sabha constituency in 2014 elections.

Most Successful parties from Patna Sahib Lok Sabha
1. BJP (4 Times) (100.0%)

== Vidhan Sabha segments ==
#	Name	District	Member	Party	2024 lead
180	Bakhtiarpur	Patna	Arun Kumar	LJP(RV)	INC
181	Digha	Patna	Sanjeev Chaurasiya	BJP	BJP
182	Bankipur	Patna	Prashant Kishor	JSP	BJP
183	Kumhrar	Patna	Sanjay Kumar Gupta	BJP	BJP
184	Patna Sahib	Patna	Ratnesh Kumar Kushwaha	BJP	BJP
185	Fatuha	Patna	Rama Nand Yadav	RJD	BJP

== Members of Parliament ==
Year	Name	Party
1957-2009 : See Patna Lok Sabha constituency
2009	Shatrughan Sinha	Bharatiya Janata Party
2014	Shatrughan Sinha	Bharatiya Janata Party
2019	Ravi Shankar Prasad	Bharatiya Janata Party
2024	Ravi Shankar Prasad	Bharatiya Janata Party

== Election results ==
=== 2024 ===
2024 Indian general elections: Patna Sahib
Party	Candidate	Votes	%	±%
BJP	Ravi Shankar Prasad	588,270	54.7	▼7.15
INC	Anshul Avijit Kushwaha	434,424	40.4	▲7.53
NOTA	None of the above	5,559	0.5	
Majority		153,846	14.3	
Turnout		1,075,992	46.87	
BJP hold		Swing		

=== 2019 ===
2019 Indian general elections: Patna Sahib
Party	Candidate	Votes	%	±%
BJP	Ravi Shankar Prasad	607,506	61.85	▲6.78
INC	Shatrughan Sinha	322,849	32.87	▲7.92
Majority		284,657	28.98	1.14
Turnout		982,939	45.80	▲0.47
BJP hold		Swing	▲6.78	

=== 2014 ===
2014 Indian general elections: Patna Sahib
Party	Candidate	Votes	%	±%
BJP	Shatrughan Sinha	485,905	55.07	▼2.23
INC	Kunal Singh	220,100	24.95	▲13.85
JD(U)	Dr. Gopal Prasad Sinha	91,024	10.32	N/A
AAP	Parveen Amanullah	16,381	1.86	N/A
SP	Umesh Kumar	10,836	1.23	N/A
NOTA	None of the Above	7,727	0.88	N/A
Majority		265,805	30.12	▼0.07
Turnout		882,262	45.33	▲11.69
BJP hold		Swing	▼2.23	

=== 2009 ===
2009 Indian general elections: Patna Sahib
Party	Candidate	Votes	%	±%
BJP	Shatrughan Sinha	316,549	57.30	
RJD	Vijay Kumar	149,779	27.11	
INC	Shekhar Suman	61,308	11.10	
CPI(ML)L	Ram Narayan Rai	5,483	0.99	
IND.	Hemant Kumar Singh	4,588	0.83	
IND.	Sanjay Verma	2,463	0.45	
Majority		166,770	30.19	
Turnout		552,416	33.64	
BJP win (new seat)				

== See also ==
- List of constituencies of the Lok Sabha
- Patna (Lok Sabha constituency)
- Pataliputra (Lok Sabha constituency)
