= Ramdeo Mahto =

Indian politician and assembly member

Ramdeo Mahto was an Indian politician, who served as Member of Bihar Legislative Assembly in undivided Bihar. Mahto was elected as a candidate of Bhartiya Jana Sangh to Bihar Legislative Assembly in 1969 Assembly elections from Patna East Assembly constituency. He was also elected for his second term in Bihar Legislative Assembly in 1977 Bihar Assembly elections, this time, as a candidate of Janata Party. Mahto was considered one of the pillars of Bhartiya Jana Sangh in 1960s and he went on to become a minister from Jana Sangh quota in Mahamaya Prasad Sinha's government in 1967. He was the founding leader of Bharatiya Jana Sangh in Bihar.

== Biography ==
Ramdeo Mahto was one of the initial leaders of Bhartiya Jana Sangh, the parent organisation of Bhartiya Janata Party in Bihar. He was a member of Koeri caste. He emerged as a significant leader of Jana Sangh in the decade of 1960s, when Jana Sangh was making inroads into Bihar. Earlier in 1962, Jana Sangh showed its presence in Bihar by winning three legislative assembly constituencies. By 1967, its role in Bihar's politics was enhanced and it got an opportunity to share power with Communist Party of India in Mahamaya Prasad Sinha's government. Being one of the pillars of party in contemporary Bihar, Mahto was chosen for ministerial berth in Government of Bihar by Jana Sangh leadership. Consequently, Mahto along with his party colleagues, Rudra Pratap Sarangi and Vijay Mitra became the first ministers from Bharatiya Jana Sangh in Bihar.

According to BJP leader Mangal Pandey, Mahto was known for his austerity and he had done significant work for strengthening the party within state of Bihar. Before becoming an MLA and a minister, Mahto used to work as a teacher. Mahto also played significant role in expansion of organisation of BJP and Jana Sangh in Bihar. Former Mines and Geology minister for Bihar, Binod Singh Kushwaha had made public statements regarding role of Mahto in bringing him into BJP from the student wing of party called Akhil Bhartiya Vidyarthi Parishad. As a member of Jana Sangh, Mahto was elected twice from Patna East Assembly constituency, which is known as Patna Sahib Assembly constituency after 2008. In 1977, he contested as a candidate of Janata Party and secured his third term as an MLA. Political analysts have consented that after the election of Mahato from Patna East Assembly constituency, the influence of Communist Party of India went down in Patna region, which was earlier considered a strong political party in this region. It is stated that after 1967, the dominant political ideology of the constituency swapped from Left to Right.

Mahto is recognised as political mentor of many of the second generation Bhartiya Janata Party leaders. Prominent BJP leader and several times Member of Legislative Assembly from Patna Sahib Assembly constituency, Nand Kishore Yadav had spoken of role of Mahto in nurturing him, during his initial days in state's politics.
