= Revenue and Land Reforms Department (Bihar) =

Indian state government

- राजस्व एवं भूमि सुधार विभाग

Agency overview
- Jurisdiction: State of Bihar
- Headquarters: Patna Secretariat, Patna; 25.599°N 85.117°E
- Minister responsible: Dilip Kumar Jaiswal, Revenue Minister
- Agency executive: Jai Singh, Secretary
- Website: state.bihar.gov.in/lrc

The Revenue and Land Reforms Department (Hindi: राजस्व एवं भूमि सुधार विभाग) is a department of Government of Bihar.

== Ministers ==
| # | Portrait | Name | Constituency | Tenure | | | Assembly (election) | Chief Minister | Party |
|---|---|---|---|---|---|---|---|---|---|
| | | Ram Nath Thakur | Samastipur | 24 November 2005 | 13 April 2008 | 2 years, 141 days | 14th (2005 election) | Nitish Kumar | Janata Dal (United) |
| | | Narendra Narayan Yadav | Alamnagar | 13 April 2008 | 26 November 2010 | 2 years, 227 days | 14th (2005 election) | Nitish Kumar | Janata Dal (United) |
| | | Ramai Ram | Bochahan | 26 November 2010 | 20 May 2014 | 3 years, 188 days | 15th (2010 election) | Nitish Kumar | Janata Dal (United) |
| | | Ramai Ram | Bochahan | 20 May 2014 | 2 June 2014 | 3 years, 188 days | 15th (2010 election) | Jitan Ram Manjhi | Janata Dal (United) |
| | | Narendra Narayan Yadav | Alamnagar | 2 June 2014 | 22 February 2015 | 1 year, 171 days | 15th (2010 election) | Jitan Ram Manjhi | Janata Dal (United) |
| | | Narendra Narayan Yadav | Alamnagar | 22 February 2015 | 20 November 2015 | 1 year, 171 days | 15th (2010 election) | Nitish Kumar | Janata Dal (United) |
| | | Madan Mohan Jha | MLC | 20 November 2015 | 27 July 2017 | 1 year, 249 days | 16th (2015 election) | Nitish Kumar | Indian National Congress |
| | | Ramnarayan Mandal | Banka | 29 July 2017 | 16 November 2020 | 3 years, 110 days | 16th (2015 election) | Nitish Kumar | Bharatiya Janata Party |
| | | Ram Surat Rai | Aurai | 16 November 2020 | 10 August 2022 | 1 year, 267 days | 17th (2020 election) | Nitish Kumar | Bharatiya Janata Party |
| | | Alok Kumar Mehta | Ujiarpur | 10 August 2022 | 20 January 2024 | 1 year, 163 days | 17th (2020 election) | Nitish Kumar | Rashtriya Janata Dal |
| | | Lalit Kumar Yadav | Darbhanga Rural | 20 January 2024 | 28 January 2024 | 8 days | 17th (2020 election) | Nitish Kumar | Rashtriya Janata Dal |
| | | Vijay Sinha | Lakhisarai | 28 January 2024 | 15 March 2024 | 47 days | 17th (2020 election) | Nitish Kumar | Bharatiya Janata Party |
| | | Dilip Jaiswal | MLC | 15 March 2024 | 26 February 2025 | 348 days | 17th (2020 election) | Nitish Kumar | Bharatiya Janata Party |
| | | Sanjay Saraogi | Darbhanga | 26 February 2025 | 20 November 2025 | 267 days | 17th (2020 election) | Nitish Kumar | Bharatiya Janata Party |
| | | Vijay Sinha | Lakhisarai | 20 November 2025 | 14 April 2026incumbent | 260 days | 18th (2025 election) | Nitish Kumar | Bharatiya Janata Party |
| | | Dilip Kumar Jaiswal | MLC | 07 May 2026 | incumbent | 91 days | 18th (2025 election) | Samrat Choudhary | Bharatiya Janata Party |

== See also ==
- Energy Department (Bihar)
- Road Construction Department (Bihar)
