= Patna West Assembly constituency =

Constituency of the Bihar legislative assembly in India

Coordinates: 25.631°N 85.033°E

Patna West
- Former constituency for the Bihar Legislative Assembly

Constituency details
- Country: India
- Region: East India
- State: Bihar
- Lok Sabha constituency: Patna
- Established: 1957
- Abolished: 2008

Patna West was an Assembly constituency in Bihar which existed till 2008. It came under Patna Lok Sabha constituency. From 2008 the seat was succeeded by Bankipur Assembly constituency. Nitin Nabin was the last MLA from this seat.

== Members of Legislative Assembly ==
Year	Name	Party
1957	Ramsaran Sao	Indian National Congress
1962	Krishna Ballabh Sahay	Indian National Congress
1967	Mahamaya Prasad Sinha	Jan Kranti Dal
1969	A. K. Sen	Communist Party of India
1972	Sunil Mukherjee	Communist Party of India
1977	Thakur Prasad	Janata Party
1980	Ranjeet Sinha	Indian National Congress
1985	Rama Nand Yadav	Independent
1990	Rama Nand Yadav	Independent
1995	Navin Kishore Prasad Sinha	Bharatiya Janata Party
2000	Navin Kishore Prasad Sinha	Bharatiya Janata Party
2005	Navin Kishore Prasad Sinha	Bharatiya Janata Party
2005	Navin Kishore Prasad Sinha	Bharatiya Janata Party
2006^	Nitin Nabin	Bharatiya Janata Party
2010 onwards: See Bankipur Assembly constituency

== Election results ==
=== 2006 by-election ===
By-election, 2006: Patna West
Party	Candidate	Votes	%	±%
BJP	Nitin Nabin	76,025	82.31	
INC	Ajay Kumar Singh	10,858	11.76	
SP	Chandan Rai	1,484	1.61	
Independent	Surendra Kumar Upadhyay	657	0.71	
RLD	Anjani Kumar	580	0.63	
Majority		65,167	70.55	
Turnout		92,364	18.02	
BJP hold		Swing		

=== October 2005 Vidhan Sabha ===
Bihar Legislative Assembly Election, October 2005: Patna West
Party	Candidate	Votes	%	±%
BJP	Nabin Kishor Prasad Sinha	1,17,915	69.33	
INC	Rajesh Kumar Sinha	31,796	18.69	
LJP	Satya Nand Sharma	8,651	5.08	
Independent	Kavi Kumar	2,606	1.53	
CPI(ML)L	Anita Kumari	1,773	1.04	
Majority		86,119	50.64	
Turnout		1,70,072	33.18	
BJP hold		Swing		

== See also ==
- Patna East Assembly constituency
- Patna Central Assembly constituency
