= Fatuha Assembly constituency =

Coordinates: 25°51′6″N 85°31′6″E

Fatuha
- Constituency No. - for the Bihar Legislative Assembly

Constituency details
- Country: India
- Region: East India
- State: Bihar
- District: Patna
- Established: 1957
- Total electors: 286,297

Member of Legislative Assembly
- 18th Bihar Legislative Assembly
- Incumbent Rama Nand Yadav
- Party: RJD
- Alliance: MGB
- Elected year: 2025
- Preceded by: Arun Manjhi, JD(U)

Fatuha Assembly constituency is one of 243 constituencies of legislative assembly of Bihar. It comes under Patna Sahib Lok Sabha constituency.

== Overview ==
Fatuha comprises CD Blocks Fatuha & Sampatchak; Gram Panchayats Marchi, Mahuli, Fatehpur, Sonwan, Punadih & Sabalpur of Patna Rural CD Block.

== Members of the Legislative Assembly ==
Year	Name	Party
1957	Shiv Mahadeo Prasad	Praja Socialist Party
1962	Kauleshwar Das	Indian National Congress
1967	R. C. Prasad	Jana Sangh
1969	Kauleshwar Das	Indian National Congress
1972	Kameshwar Paswan	Bharatiya Jana Sangh
1977	Kameshwar Paswan	Janata Party
1980	Punit Rai	Janata Party (Secular)
1985	Punit Rai	Lok Dal
1990	Punit Rai	Janata Dal
1995	Punit Rai	Janata Dal
2000	Dinesh Chaudhary	Rashtriya Janata Dal
2003^	Om Prakash Paswan	Rashtriya Janata Dal
2005	Saryug Paswan	Janata Dal (United)
2005	Saryug Paswan	Janata Dal (United)
2009^	Arun Manjhi	Janata Dal (United)
2010	Rama Nand Yadav	Rashtriya Janata Dal
2015	Rama Nand Yadav	Rashtriya Janata Dal
2020	Rama Nand Yadav	Rashtriya Janata Dal
2025	Rama Nand Yadav	Rashtriya Janata Dal

== Election results ==
=== 2025 ===
Bihar Legislative Assembly Election, 2025: Fatuha
Party	Candidate	Votes	%	±%
RJD	Dr. R. N. Yadav	90,558	45.69	▼5.18
LJP(RV)	Rupa Kumari	82,566	41.66	
JSP	Raju Kumar	8,598	4.34	
Independent	Sanjeet Kumar	4,802	2.42	
NOTA	None of the above	3,938	1.99	▲1.54
Majority		7,992	4.03	▼7.46
Turnout		198,180	69.22	▲7.06
RJD hold		Swing		

=== 2020 ===
Bihar Assembly election, 2020: Fatuha
Party	Candidate	Votes	%	±%
RJD	Dr. R. N. Yadav	85,769	50.87	+0.36
BJP	Satyendra Kumar Singh	66,399	39.38	
Independent	Rakesh Sharma	2,819	1.67	
Independent	Shakti Paswan	2,374	1.41	
Independent	Dhirendra Kumar	1,572	0.93	
NOTA	None of the above	762	0.45	−1.84
Majority		19,370	11.49	−8.4
Turnout		168,600	62.16	+2.07
RJD hold		Swing		

=== 2015 ===
Bihar Assembly election, 2015: Fatuha
Party	Candidate	Votes	%	±%
RJD	Rama Nand Yadav	77,210	50.51	
LJP	Satyendra Kumar Singh	46,808	30.62	
SP	Satish Kumar	5,854	3.83	
CPI(ML)L	Shalendra Kumar	4,263	2.79	
BSP	Ranjan Kumar Singh	4,101	2.68	
Independent	Devendra Prasad Singh	3,370	2.2	
Independent	Sri Kant Prasad	2,153	1.41	
NOTA	None of the above	3,493	2.29	
Majority		30,402	19.89	
Turnout		152,865	60.09	
RJD hold		Swing		

=== 2010 ===
Bihar Assembly election, 2010: Fatuha
Party	Candidate	Votes	%	±%
RJD	Dr. Ramanand Yadav	50,218	44.93	
JD(U)	Ajay Kumar Singh	40,562	36.29	
Independent	Deo Kumar	4,299	3.85	
CPI(ML)L	Umesh Singh	3,533	3.16	
Independent	Ram Pravesh Singh	3,479	3.11	
Majority		9,656	8.64	
Turnout		1,11,774	56.47	
RJD gain from JD(U)		Swing		

== See also ==
- List of Assembly constituencies of Bihar
- Fatuha
