= Bankipur Assembly constituency =

Assembly constituency in Bihar, India

Coordinates: 25°38′28″N 85°5′26″E

Bankipur
- Constituency No. 182 for the Bihar Legislative Assembly

Constituency details
- Country: India
- Region: East India
- State: Bihar
- District: Patna
- Lok Sabha constituency: Patna Sahib
- Established: 2008
- Total electors: 379,402
- Reservation: None

Member of Legislative Assembly
- 18th Bihar Legislative Assembly
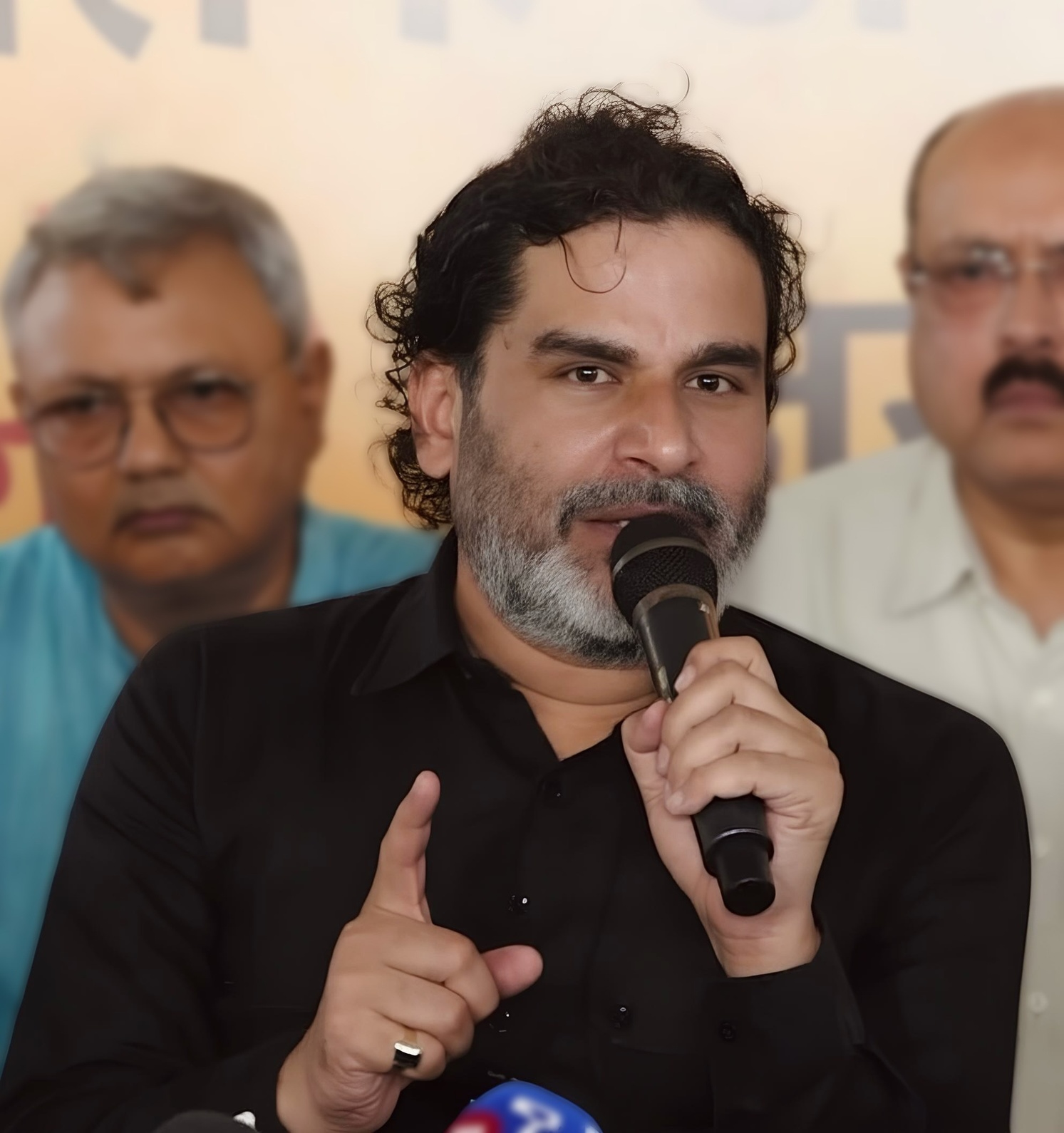
- Incumbent Prashant Kishor
- Party: JSP
- Elected year: 2026
- Preceded by: Nitin Nabin

Bankipur Assembly constituency is one of the 243 constituencies of the Bihar legislative assembly. It is a segment of the Patna Sahib Lok Sabha constituency.

== Overview ==
The Bankipur Assembly constituency was created following the implementation of the Delimitation of Parliamentary and Assembly Constituencies Order, 2008. It was formed primarily from the former Patna West Assembly constituency, while also incorporating parts of the erstwhile Patna Central Assembly constituency. As part of the same delimitation exercise, the remaining areas of Patna West were included in the newly created Digha Assembly constituency. The constituency's boundaries were redrawn to reflect changes in population and urban expansion within Patna.

Bankipur comprises Ward Nos. 4, 5, 7 to 13 & 15 in Patna Municipal Corporation of Patna Rural CD Block. (Note: These are the ward numbers defined by the 2008 Delimitation Order for Assembly constituency boundaries. Even if the Patna Municipal Corporation has renumbered or reorganised municipal wards for civic administration since then, the Assembly constituency boundaries continue to follow the delimitation notified by the Election Commission until a fresh delimitation is carried out.) The constituency has diversified voters group consisting as of 64000 Baniya (all sub castes), 57000 Kayastha caste, 33000 Ahir, 31000 Muslims, 27000 Kurmi, 23000 Bhumihar, 21000 Rajputs, 18000 Kushwaha, 14000 Dhanuk, 14000 Chandrawanshi and rest comprises other EBC groups and dalits in this constituency.

Bankipur is bordered by Digha, Kumhrar and Patna Sahib assembly constituencies, all within the Patna Sahib Lok Sabha constituency, while the Ganges forms its northern boundary with Sonepur constituency.

== Members of the Legislative Assembly ==
Year	Name	Party
Before 2008: See Patna West
2010	Nitin Nabin	Bharatiya Janata Party
2015	Nitin Nabin	Bharatiya Janata Party
2020	Nitin Nabin	Bharatiya Janata Party
2025	Nitin Nabin	Bharatiya Janata Party
2026^	Prashant Kishor	Jan Suraaj Party

== Election results ==
=== 2026 by-election ===
2026 Bihar Legislative Assembly by-election: Bankipur
Party	Candidate	Votes	%	±%
JSP	Prashant Kishor	64,151	49.23	+44.31
BJP	Neeraj Kumar	44,827	34.40	−28.26
RJD	Rekha Kumari	14,273	10.95	−18.60
NOTA	None of the above	646	0.50	−0.43
Majority		19,324	13.43	−18.28
Turnout		130,313	34.30	−7.05
JSP gain from BJP		Swing		

=== 2025 ===
2025 Bihar Legislative Assembly election: Bankipur
Party	Candidate	Votes	%	±%
BJP	Nitin Nabin	98,299	62.66	+3.61
RJD	Rekha Kumari	46,363	29.55	
JSP	Vandana Kumari	7,717	4.92	
NOTA	None of the above	1,464	0.93	+0.07
Majority		51,936	33.11	+5.36
Turnout		156,885	41.35	+5.44
BJP hold		Swing		

=== 2020 ===
2020 Bihar Legislative Assembly election: Bankipur
Party	Candidate	Votes	%	±%
BJP	Nitin Nabin	83,068	59.05	−1.14
INC	Luv Sinha	44,032	31.30	−1.30
PP	Pushpam Priya Choudhary	5,189	3.69	
NOTA	None of the above	1,213	0.86	+0.15
Majority		39,036	27.75	+0.16
Turnout		140,683	35.91	−4.33
BJP hold		Swing		

=== 2015 ===
Bihar Assembly election, 2015: Bankipur
Party	Candidate	Votes	%	±%
BJP	Nitin Nabin	86,759	60.19	
INC	Ashish Kumar	46,992	32.60	
CPI	Shaukat Ali	1,542	1.07	
NOTA	None of the above	1,021	0.71	
Majority		39,767	27.59	
Turnout		144,152	40.24	
BJP hold		Swing		

=== 2010 ===
Bihar Legislative Assembly Election, 2010: Bankipur
Party	Candidate	Votes	%	±%
BJP	Nitin Nabin	78,771	72.06	
RJD	Binod Kumar Srivastava	17,931	16.40	
INC	Durga Prasad	6,018	5.51	
NCP	Jakir Hussain	1,259	1.15	
Independent	Sunita Preetam	940	0.86	
Majority		60,840	55.66	
Turnout		109,309	36.96	
BJP win (new seat)				

== See also ==
- List of constituencies of the Bihar Legislative Assembly
- Bankipore
- Kumhrar Assembly constituency
- Digha Assembly constituency
