= Energy Department (Bihar) =

Indian state government

- ऊर्जा विभाग

Agency overview
- Jurisdiction: State of Bihar
- Headquarters: 2nd Floor, Vidyut Bhawan-II, Bailey Road, Patna-01; 25°36′36″N 85°07′40″E
- Minister responsible: Shailesh Kumar Mandal, Energy Minister
- Agency executive: Ajay Yadav, Secretary
- Website: state.bihar.gov.in/energy

The Energy Department (Hindi: ऊर्जा विभाग) is a department of Government of Bihar.

== Ministers ==
#	Portrait	Name	Constituency	Tenure			Assembly (election)	Chief Minister	Party
		Bijendra Yadav	Supaul	24 November 2005	13 April 2008	2 years, 141 days	14th (2005 election)	Nitish Kumar	Janata Dal (United)
	Portrait of Ramashray Prasad Singh	Ramashray Prasad Singh	MLC	13 April 2008	26 November 2010	2 years, 227 days	14th (2005 election)	Nitish Kumar	Janata Dal (United)
		Bijendra Yadav	Supaul	26 November 2010	20 May 2014	3 years, 175 days	15th (2010 election)	Nitish Kumar	Janata Dal (United)
		Jitan Ram Manjhi	Makhdumpur	20 May 2014	2 June 2014	13 days	15th (2010 election)	himself	Janata Dal (United)
		Bijendra Yadav	Supaul	2 June 2014	22 February 2015	12 years, 168 days	15th (2010 election)	Jitan Ram Manjhi	Janata Dal (United)
		Bijendra Yadav	Supaul	22 February 2015	20 November 2015	12 years, 168 days	15th (2010 election)	Nitish Kumar	Janata Dal (United)
		Bijendra Yadav	Supaul	20 November 2015	29 July 2017	12 years, 168 days	16th (2015 election)	Nitish Kumar	Janata Dal (United)
		Bijendra Yadav	Supaul	29 July 2017	16 November 2020	12 years, 168 days	16th (2015 election)	Nitish Kumar	Janata Dal (United)
		Bijendra Yadav	Supaul	16 November 2020	10 August 2022	12 years, 168 days	17th (2020 election)	Nitish Kumar	Janata Dal (United)
		Bijendra Yadav	Supaul	10 August 2022	28 January 2024	12 years, 168 days	17th (2020 election)	Nitish Kumar	Janata Dal (United)
		Bijendra Yadav	Supaul	28 January 2024	20 November 2025	12 years, 168 days	17th (2020 election)	Nitish Kumar	Janata Dal (United)
		Bijendra Yadav	Supaul	20 November 2025	14 April 2026	12 years, 168 days	18th (2025 election)	Nitish Kumar	Janata Dal (United)
		Shailesh Kumar Mandal	Gopalpur	07 May 2026	incumbent	194 days	18th (2025 election)	Samrat Choudhary	Janata Dal (United)

== See also ==
- Road Construction Department (Bihar)
- Revenue and Land Reforms Department (Bihar)
