= MPSC =

MPSC may stand for:

- Military Prison Staff Corps
- Maharashtra Public Service Commission
- Manipur Public Service Commission
- Michigan Public Service Commission
- Mutual Defense Pact of the Southeastern Provinces
- Mohammadpur Preparatory School & College
