= Ashish Sinha =

Indian cricketer and politician (born 1990)

Ashish Sinha (born 16 September 1990) is an Indian cricketer, politician and advocate. He is the son of Arun Kumar Sinha, BJP MLA from Kumhrar Assembly seat. He is the former president of Patna University Students Union (PUSU). He made his first-class debut for Jharkhand against Rajasthan in 2010-11 Ranji Trophy on 8 December 2010. Ahead of the 2018–19 Ranji Trophy, he transferred from Jharkhand to Bihar. He made his List A debut for Bihar in the 2018–19 Vijay Hazare Trophy on 20 September 2018. He was in controversy when he was selected as a player in Vijay Hazare Trophy for Bihar.
