= Patna Central Assembly constituency =

Bihar Assembly constituency

Coordinates: 25.60°N 85.14°E

Patna Central
- Former constituency for the Bihar Legislative Assembly

Constituency details
- Country: India
- Region: East India
- State: Bihar
- Lok Sabha constituency: Patna
- Established: 1977
- Abolished: 2008

Patna Central was an Assembly constituency in Bihar which existed till 2008. It came under Patna Lok Sabha constituency. From 2008 the seat was succeeded by Kumhrar Assembly constituency. Arun Kumar Sinha was the last MLA from this constituency.

== Members of Legislative Assembly ==
Year	Name	Party
1977	Mohammad Shahabuddin	Janata Party
1980	Shailendra Nath Shrivastava	Bharatiya Janata Party
1985	Aquil Haider	Indian National Congress
1990	Sushil Kumar Modi	Bharatiya Janata Party
1995	Sushil Kumar Modi	Bharatiya Janata Party
2000	Sushil Kumar Modi	Bharatiya Janata Party
2005	Arun Kumar Sinha	Bharatiya Janata Party
2005	Arun Kumar Sinha	Bharatiya Janata Party
2010 onwards: See Kumhrar Assembly constituency

== Election results ==
=== October 2005 ===
October 2005 Bihar Legislative Assembly election: Patna Central
Party	Candidate	Votes	%	±%
BJP	Arun Kumar Sinha	89,614	69.29	
NCP	Aquil Haider	29,574	22.83	
CPI	Mohan Prasad	2,962	2.29	
SS	Om Prakash Awtar	1,909	1.47	
Independent	Saroj Kant Tripathi	1,079	0.83	
Majority		60,040	46.46	
Turnout		1,29,329	35.82	
BJP hold		Swing		

== See also ==
- Patna East Assembly constituency
- Patna West Assembly constituency
- Patna Central Lok Sabha constituency
