= Thakur Prasad =

Indian politician and lawyer

Cabinet Minister, Department of Industries, Bihar

Personal details
- Born: India
- Party: Bharatiya Jana Sangh
- Children: Ravi Shankar Prasad
- Profession: Lawyer

Thakur Prasad was an eminent lawyer of Patna High Court, Bihar. He was one of the founding member of Bharatiya Jana Sangh and was its state president for 10 years. He also held the Industry portfolio in the state cabinet of Bihar and was a cabinet minister in Karpoori Thakur ministry in 1977.

== Early life and education ==
He was the father of Ravi Shankar Prasad, the ex Law Minister of India and Anuradha Prasad, editor in chief of News 24 (India).

== Law career ==
He was a senior advocate at Patna High Court.

== Political career ==
Thakur prasad was a member of Bihar Legislative Assembly from Patna West Assembly constituency from 1977 to 1980.
