= Ratnesh Kumar Kushwaha =

Indian politician and lawyer

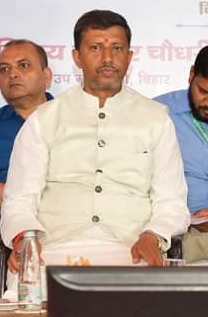

Member of Bihar Legislative Assembly
- Incumbent
- Assumed office 2025
- Preceded by: Nand Kishore Yadav
- Constituency: Patna Sahib

State Secretary of Bharatiya Janata Party – Bihar
- Incumbent
- Assumed office 9 August 2023
- President: Samrat Choudhary; Dilip Jaiswal

Personal details
- Party: Bharatiya Janata Party
- Education: Patna University
- Profession: Politician, Advocate

Ratnesh Kumar Kushwaha is an Indian politician and lawyer from Bihar. He is elected as a Member of Legislative Assembly in 2025 Bihar Legislative Assembly election from Patna Sahib constituency. He is a member of the Bharatiya Janata Party

== Life ==
He is a resident of Kumhrar Assembly constituency region of Patna near Musallapur. He was associated with Bharatiya Janata Party's parent organisation Rashtriya Swayamsevak Sangh from his early life and was a close accomplice of veteran BJP leader Sushil Kumar Modi.

In 2025 Bihar Legislative Assembly elections, he defeated Shashant Shekhar of Indian National Congress by a fair margin of nearly 39,000 votes.

Being an Advocate by profession, he represented centre in a case related to an Artificial Intelligence generated video featuring PM Narendra Modi's mother in Patna High Court.
