= Sanjay Kumar Gupta (BJP politician) =

Indian politician

Member of Bihar Legislative Assembly
- Incumbent
- Assumed office 14 November 2025
- Preceded by: Arun Sinha
- Constituency: Kumhrar

State Secretary of Bharatiya Janata Party – Bihar
- Incumbent
- Assumed office 9 August 2023
- President: Samrat Choudhary; Dilip Jaiswal; Sanjay Saraogi

Personal details
- Party: Bharatiya Janata Party
- Profession: Politician

Sanjay Kumar Gupta is an Indian politician from Bihar. He has been elected as a Member of Bihar Legislative Assembly in 2025 from Kumhrar Assembly constituency. He was appointed as State Secretary of Bharatiya Janata Party – Bihar on 9 August 2023 under the Presidency of Samrat Choudhary.
