= Shah Ozair Munemi =

Indian independence activist

Syed Shah Muhammad Ozair Munemi (1899–1961) was an Indian independence activist. He was born into a wealthy Zamindar family of Phulwari Sharif, Bihar, son of Deputy Magistrate Syed Abdul Aziz.
