= Patna East Assembly constituency =

Former Assembly constituency in Bihar, India

Coordinates: 25.588°N 85.204°E

Patna East
- Former constituency for the Bihar Legislative Assembly

Constituency details
- Country: India
- Region: East India
- State: Bihar
- Lok Sabha constituency: Patna
- Established: 1957
- Abolished: 2008

Patna East was an Assembly constituency in Bihar which existed until 2008. It came under Patna Lok Sabha constituency. From 2008 the seat was succeeded by Patna Sahib Assembly constituency. Nand Kishore Yadav was the last MLA from this constituency.

== Members of Legislative Assembly ==
Year	Name	Party
1957	Zahra Ahmad	Indian National Congress
1962	Zahra Ahmad	Indian National Congress
1967	Ramdeo Mahto	Bharatiya Jana Sangh
1969	Ramdeo Mahto	Bharatiya Jana Sangh
1972	Jamil Ahmed	Indian National Congress
1977	Ramdeo Mahto	Janata Party
1980	Sharat Kumar Jain	Indian National Congress (I)
1985	Sharat Kumar Jain	Indian National Congress
1990	Mahtab Lal Singh	Janata Dal
1995	Nand Kishore Yadav	Bharatiya Janata Party
2000	Nand Kishore Yadav	Bharatiya Janata Party
2005	Nand Kishore Yadav	Bharatiya Janata Party
2005	Nand Kishore Yadav	Bharatiya Janata Party
2010 onwards: See Patna Sahib Assembly constituency

== Election results ==
=== October 2005 Vidhan Sabha ===
October 2005 Vidhan Sabha election: Patna East
Party	Candidate	Votes	%	±%
BJP	Nand Kishore Yadav	70,148	59.33	
RJD	Bharti Devi	34,178	28.91	
LJP	Ramesh Chandra	5,677	4.80	
Majority		35,790		
Turnout		1,18,219		
BJP hold		Swing		

== See also ==
- Patna West Assembly constituency
- Patna Central Assembly constituency
- Patna East Lok Sabha constituency
