= Prashant Kishor =

Indian politician (born 1977)

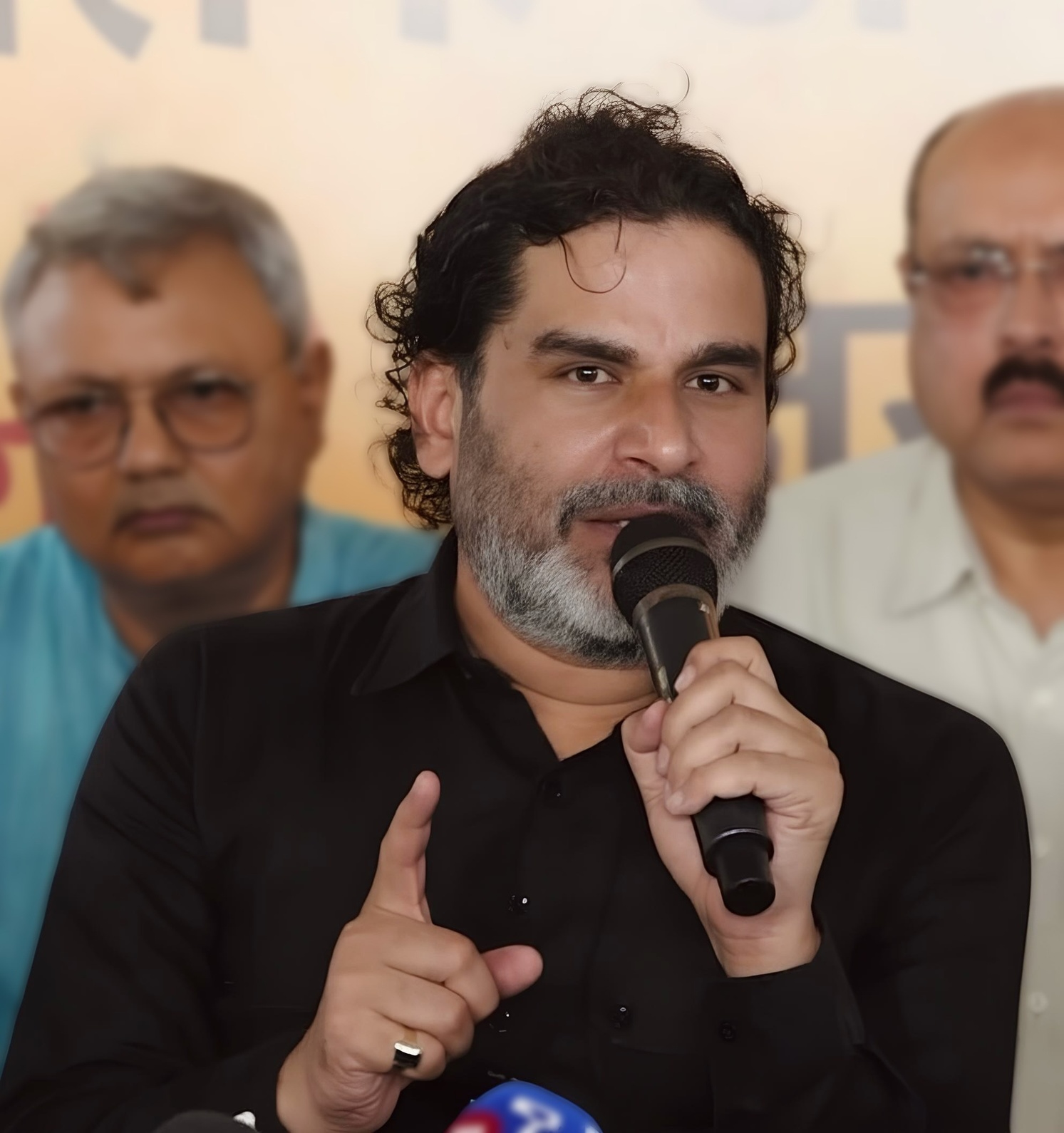
- Kishor in 2025

Member of the Bihar Legislative Assembly
- Incumbent
- Assumed office 3 August 2026
- Preceded by: Nitin Nabin
- Constituency: Bankipur

Founder of Jan Suraaj Party
- Incumbent
- Assumed office 2 October 2024
- Preceded by: Position established

Leader of Jan Suraaj Party Legislature Party
- Incumbent
- Assumed office 3 August 2026

Personal details
- Born: 20 March 1977 (age 49) Konar, Rohtas, Bihar, India
- Party: Jan Suraaj Party (2022–present)
- Other political affiliations: Janata Dal (United) (2018–2020)
- Spouse: Jahnavi Das
- Children: 1
- Education: • University of Lucknow, Uttar Pradesh (BBA) • ASCI, Hyderabad (MHA; Programme developed in collaboration with Johns Hopkins University, USA, and Hinduja Hospital)(Post Graduation) • CAVILAM Vichy, University of Clermont-Ferrand, France (Intensive French Language Course)
- Occupation: Politician; Political strategist (former); Public Health Specialist (former)
- Website: www.jansuraaj.org

Prashant Kishor (Note: Pronounced /prəˈʃɑːnt kɪˈʃɔːr/ pruh-SHAHNT ki-SHOR; Hindi: [prəˈʃɑːnt̪ kɪˈʃoːɾ]) (born 20 March 1977), colloquially known as PK, is an Indian politician currently serving as the Member of Bihar Legislative Assembly representing Bankipur assembly constituency, Patna, Bihar. He is a former political strategist, political advisor, consultant, and the founder of the Jan Suraaj Party. He worked in public health in a United Nations funded programme for eight years before venturing into Indian politics and working as a political strategist.

Kishor has worked as a successful political strategist for several political parties including the BJP, JD(U), INC, AAP, YSRCP, DMK and TMC. His first major political campaign was in 2011 to help Narendra Modi, then Chief Minister of Gujarat get re-elected to the CM Office for a third time in the Gujarat Assembly Elections 2012. In 2024, he launched the Jan Suraaj Party in Bihar and contested the 2025 Bihar Legislative Assembly election. In 2026, he won the by-election for Bankipur assembly constituency.

== Early life ==
Kishor was born on 20 March 1977, Konar village of Rohtas district, Bihar to Shrikant Pandey, a physician and Sushila Pandey, a homemaker.

He later moved to Buxar where he completed his secondary education. He earned Bachelor of Business Administration degree from Department of Business Studies at University of Lucknow in 1999. Then he completed his Master of Healthcare Management (MHA) from Administrative Staff College of India (ASCI), Hyderabad SHMPD in Collaboration with Johns Hopkins University, USA & Hinduja Hospital in 2001-2003.

== Personal life ==
Kishor is married to Jahnavi Das, a physician hailing from Guwahati, Assam. The couple have a son together.

== Work at United Nations ==
Kishor worked in public health programs funded by the United Nations for eight years till 2011. He worked as the head of social policy and planning at UNICEF in Chad, heading a UN aid mission, when he prepared a paper documenting economic prosperity and malnutrition in India. The paper reportedly was sent to then prime minister Manmohan Singh, and also caught the attention of Narendra Modi, the then chief minister of Gujarat, who invited Kishor for a meeting which led to Kishor joining Modi's team as a political strategist.

== Work as a political strategist ==
Kishor has worked as a political strategist for many Indian political parties helping them win elections. It is said that he has been a Kingmaker, ensuring the victory of six chief ministers within six years of his work.

He started his work with the BJP in 2011. Kishor worked reportedly pro bono, and without holding any office in the Bharatiya Janata Party (BJP) or Gujarat Government, Kishor worked as a political strategist for BJP's pre-election campaign in 2012 Gujarat Legislative Assembly election and 2014 Lok Sabha election. In 2013, Kishor co-founded Citizens for Accountable Governance (CAG), a media and publicity company in preparation for the May 2014 general election of India, with Robbin Sharrma and others. Kishor and his team were credited with formulating an innovative marketing and advertising campaign for Narendra Modi, the Chai Pe Charcha discussions, 3D rallies, Run for Unity, Manthan and several social media programs.

In 2015, he helped Nitish Kumar led Mahagathbandhan win the 2015 Bihar Legislative Assembly election. Kishor joined the Janata Dal (United) on 16 September 2018 as the vice-president of the party. Kishor and other CAG members regrouped as I-PAC to work with Nitish Kumar, in a bid to win a third term as chief minister in the Bihar Legislative Assembly election. The claims were that Kishor dramatically influenced the strategy, resources and alliances for the campaign. Upon winning the Bihar elections, Chief Minister Nitish Kumar named Kishor as his advisor for planning and program implementation, tasked with identifying ways to implement the seven-point agenda that was promised during Kumar's election campaign. In 2020, Kishor was involved with the 2020 Bihar Legislative Assembly election.

In 2016 the Indian National Congress employed Kishor for the 2017 Uttar Pradesh Legislative Assembly election. However, these elections were a failure for Congress and Kishor as BJP won more than 300 seats and Congress could only manage seven seats. This was also the first and only time Kishor failed to help a party win the elections.

Kishor has successfully worked with several other political parties in India as well including Amarinder Singh for the 2017 Punjab Legislative Assembly election, Y. S. Jagan Mohan Reddy for the 2019 Andhra Pradesh Legislative Assembly election, Arvind Kejriwal for the 2020 Delhi Legislative Assembly election, Mamata Banerjee for the 2021 West Bengal Legislative Assembly election, and M. K. Stalin for the 2021 Tamil Nadu Legislative Assembly election as well.

After announcing his retirement from election strategy work in 2021, Kishor began informally advising TVK president Vijay ahead of the 2026 Tamil Nadu Legislative Assembly election, working alongside the party's existing strategist John Arokiasamy. At TVK's first-anniversary event in Mahabalipuram in February 2025, Kishor said, "I am not here to help my brother, my friend, Vijay. Because he doesn't need that help. He is a new hope for Tamil Nadu and that is why I am here" framing his involvement as personal rather than strategic. TVK, contesting its first election, won 108 of 234 seats, short of a majority but enough to become the state's single-largest party, a result widely credited in Indian media to Kishor's involvement.

=== Electoral debut ===
Kishor contested his first election from Bankipur in the 2026 by-election, which he won by a margin of 19,324 votes. The seat was vacated when the previous MLA Nitin Nabin resigned after his election to the Rajya Sabha, following his elevation as the BJP national president. Kishor thanked the voters of the constituency and stated his intention to work towards Bihar's development. He further remarked that the election result reflected the public's expectations for leadership focused on improving education and generating employment in the state.

=== Retirement ===
After the win of the All India Trinamool Congress in the 2021 West Bengal Legislative Assembly election and Dravida Munnetra Kazhagam in the 2021 Tamil Nadu Legislative Assembly election, Kishor declared that he was quitting as an election strategist. In an interview with NDTV on 2 May 2021, Kishor told anchor Sreenivasan Jain on live TV, "I do not want to continue what I am doing. I have done enough. Time for me to take a break and do something else in life. I want to quit this space."

== Political career ==
=== Jan Suraaj ===
A year later on 2 May 2021, Kishor hinted toward the formation of a political outfit of his own with a tweet that said that it was time to go to the "Real Masters, The People" and on the path of "Jan Suraaj-Peoples Good Governance [sic]"similar to his previous campaign titled "Baat Bihar Ki". Kishor announced a 3,000 km Padyatra which would take place across Bihar, and would involve Kishor meeting with people from all across the state. The "Padayatra" took place under his "Jan Suraaj Padayatra" campaign. One of the stated goals of the campaign was to form a political party, which he estimated would fight its first election in the 2025 Bihar Legislative Assembly.

On 2 October 2024, Kishor announced the Jan Suraaj campaign as a formal political party, which was named as the Jan Suraaj Party (JSP). On 9 October 2025, JSP released its first candidate list of 51 candidates for the 2025 Bihar Legislative Assembly, followed by the second list with 71 more candidates. It was speculated that he would contest an election from the Raghopur assembly constituency, but on 14 October, Kishor confirmed that he will not contest.The party did not win any seats in the 2025 Bihar Legislative Assembly. The party won its first seat when Kishor won the Bankipur by-election in 2026.

=== Electoral performance ===
Kishor won his first election in a by-election from Bankipur in 2026 and became a Member of the Bihar Legislative Assembly. He took oath as a Member of the Bihar Legislative Assembly on 17th August 2026.
