= Dilip Sinha =

Indian diplomat

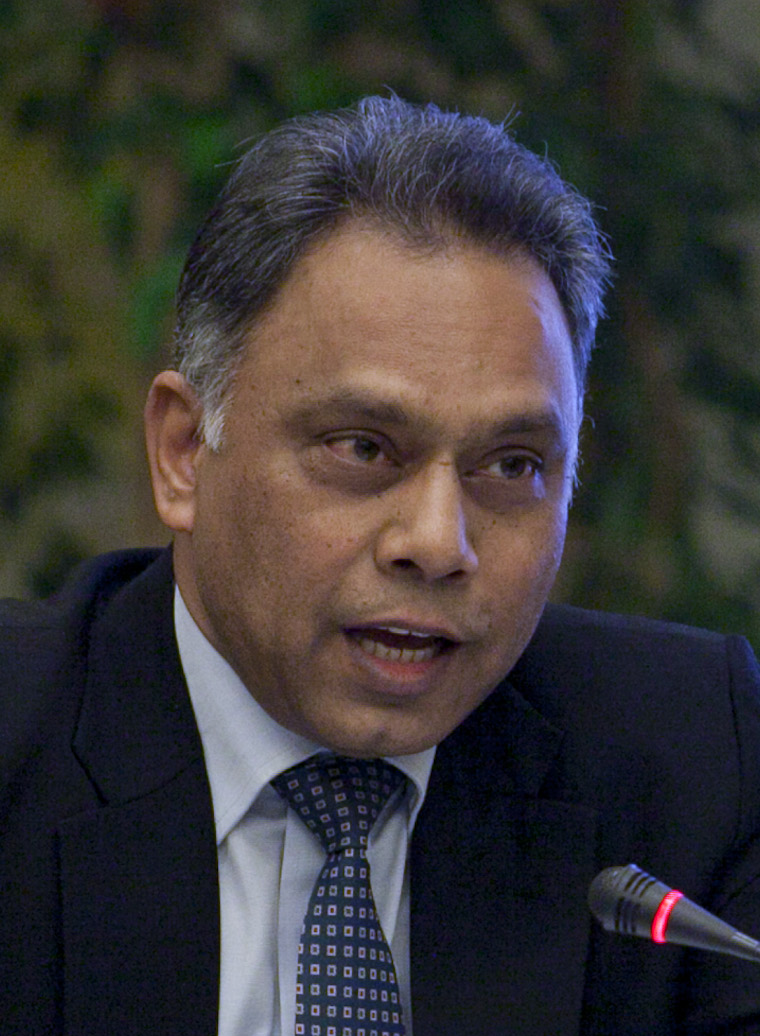

Public Speaker, Writer, Diplomat

Chairman of Manipur Public Service Commission, India
- In office 2015–2016
- Succeeded by: Lt Gen Konsam Himalaya Singh

Permanent Representative of India to the United Nations in Geneva
- In office 2012–2014

Vice President of the United Nations Human Rights Council, Geneva
- In office 2013–2014

Ambassador of India to Greece
- In office 2007–2010

Personal details
- Born: 8 November 1954 (age 71) India
- Spouse: Shrimi Sinha
- Children: 2
- Education: Patna University, Patna
- Profession: Civil Servant (Indian Foreign Service)

Dilip Sinha (born 1954) is an Indian diplomat and former public administrator. He served in the Indian Foreign Service from 1978 to 2014 and as chairman of the Manipur Public Service Commission, India, from 2015 to 2016. Ambassador Sinha is a public speaker on international security, Afghanistan-Pakistan-Iran and environmental diplomacy. He is the author of Legitimacy of Power: The Permanence of Five in the Security Council (2018, Vij Books). The book traces the origins of international security cooperation and scrutinizes the moorings of the UN Security Council's powers in international law.

Dilip Sinha was head of India's UN affairs during its membership of the Security Council in the eventful period, 2011–2012. He was ambassador to the UN in Geneva, where he was elected vice president of the UN Human Rights Council in 2014 and vice chairman of the South Centre. Sinha steered India's response to the crises in Libya and Syria in the Security Council and to Sri Lanka in the Human Rights Council. During his diplomatic career, Sinha headed India's relations with Pakistan, Afghanistan, and Iran and served in Germany, Egypt, Pakistan, Brazil, Bangladesh, and Greece.

Sinha currently serves on the board of the Asian Development Research Institute Society.

In August 2023, Pan Macmillan India announced the acquisition of IMPERIAL GAMES IN TIBET: The Battle for Survival and Sovereignty by Dilip Sinha. The book will be published in spring/summer 2024. .

Dilip Sinha is represented by literary agent, A Suitable Agency .

== Indian Foreign Service ==
Dilip Sinha is a member of the 1978 batch of the Indian Foreign Service. He served as India's Ambassador and Permanent Representative to the United Nations in Geneva from 2012 to 2014 and as India's Ambassador to Greece from 2007 to 2010.

As part of his multilateral assignments, Sinha represented India in its three-year term on the United Nations Human Rights Council and was the first Indian to be elected as vice-president of the Human Rights Council Bureau. Sinha was also elected Vice Convener of the South Centre Council of Representatives in Geneva.

Prior to taking up his assignment in Geneva, Sinha served as Special Secretary for International Organizations and Environmental Diplomacy in the Government of India. He was responsible for coordinating India diplomacy at the multilateral level, including its 2011–2012 term on the UN Security Council and on climate change negotiations.

Sinha was Deputy High Commissioner of India to Bangladesh from 2002 to 2004 and Deputy Chief of Mission at the Embassy of India in Brazil from 1999 to 2002. Earlier international postings include counsellor and minister (economic) in the Permanent Mission of India to the UN Offices in Geneva, first secretary at the High Commission of India in Pakistan and second secretary at the Embassy of India in Egypt and in Germany.

At the Ministry of External Affairs (India), apart from serving as Special Secretary and Additional Secretary from 2010 to 2012, Sinha was joint secretary in charge of the Pakistan, Afghanistan and Iran desk from 2005 to 2007, deputy secretary for press relations from 1990 to 1991 and director in the Prime Minister's Office (India) from 1992 to 1995.

== Books and journals ==
Dilip Sinha is the author of Legitimacy of Power: The Permanence of Five in the Security Council (2018, Vij Books).

The book traces the origins of international security cooperation and scrutinizes the moorings of the UN Security Council's powers in international law. It critiques the permanent five's manipulation of the council to aggressively strengthen their global dominance and legitimise their exercise of power.

Notable reviews include that of:

Shyam Saran, India's Foreign Secretary (2004-2006)

Dilip Sinha combines his experience in multilateral diplomacy with research t produce a work on the United Nations Security Council and its evolving role in international security.

Betty E. King, US Ambassador to the UN in Geneva (2009-2013)

The cover of The Legitimacy of Power is an apt reflection of the operations of the United Nations. Despite its increase in country memberships across the globe since its inception, the most powerful and important arm of the organization, i.e. the Security Council, has resisted numerical changes in its permanent memberships. Legitimacy of power should be an apt beginning for the legitimacy of change.

Vijay K. Nambiar, Chef de Cabinet to the UN secretary-general (2007-2012)

Has historical detail, legal rigor as well as a nuanced awareness of the normative compulsions and practical politics driving this institution. Sinha rightly warns us that a Security Council rendered unpredictable or unreliable by P-5 vagaries could affect its own credibility and ultimately the legitimacy of the UN itself.

== Personal life ==
Dilip Sinha is married to Shrimi Sinha and has two sons. He speaks English, Hindi and German fluently.

== Early life and education ==
Dilip Sinha was born in Kanpur, India. He obtained his master's degree in Political Science from Patna University in Patna, Bihar.
