= Anando Mukerjee =

Indian singer (born 1977)

The Reverend Anando Mukerjee
- Born: 14 April 1977 (age 49); Patna, Bihar, INDIA
- Occupation: Opera singer (Tenor)
- Years active: 2006–present
- Website: www.anandomukerjee.com

Anando Mukerjee (born 1977) is an Indian tenor and deacon. He is considered to be the only internationally recognized operatic tenor from India and has been described as 'India's finest tenor'. He is also a self-supporting curate in the Church of England parish of St James Church, Muswell Hill.

== Early life ==
Anando Mukerjee was born in Patna, Bihar, India, on April 14, 1977. A native of India, he received degrees in Zoology & Natural Sciences from Delhi and Cambridge Universities respectively, where he was an Inlaks scholar.

== Study ==
He pursued his vocal studies privately in London but has said that the highlight of his vocal training was seven years of discipleship under legendary Swedish tenor Nicolai Gedda. He was granted a Charles Wallace India Trust British Council Award in 2001 and was a finalist in the UK National Mozart Competition in 2007 and the Wagner Society Bayreuth Bursary Competition in 2012.

== Career ==
Anando Mukerjee's significant operatic debut took place in 2006 when he sang Rodolfo (La bohème) at the Belgrade National Opera, Serbia at the personal invitation of HRH Princess Elizabeth of Yugoslavia. It was followed by the period of intense learning of new roles and performing across the UK, including Beppe (Pagliacci, Dorset Opera), Tobias (Tobias and the Angel, New Sussex Opera), Macduff (Macbeth, White Horse Opera), Nemorino (L’elisir d’amore, Somerset Opera), Alfred (Die Fledermaus, Surrey Opera), Don Jose (Carmen, Plymouth Operatic Society, Windsor & Eton Opera Royal Command Performance), Alfredo (La traviata, Stentorphon Opera, Somerset Opera, Windsor & Eton Opera), The Duke of Mantua (Rigoletto, Bury Court Opera, Anghiari Festival, Scottish Opera), Cavaradossi (Tosca, Little Venice Music Festival, Philharmonia Britannica), Riccardo (Un ballo in maschera, Windsor & Eton Opera).

Mukerjee made his Italian debut at the Teatro dei Rozzi, Sienna, taking part in the Concordia International Ensemble Gala. Other concert appearances include his Cadogan Hall debut in London Lyric Opera's cycle A Feast of Orchestral Songs; the opening of the 9th season of the Symphony Orchestra of India at the NCPA Bhabha Opera House, Bombay; the Maximum India Festival, Kennedy Center, Washington DC, with the Washington National Opera; and his debut at the Al-Madinat Opera House in Dubai. His notable recitals include his Wigmore Hall appearance accompanied by Leslie Howard and featured on BBC Radio 3's In Tune; the Maria Callas International Club's 30th Anniversary Celebration at the Royal Opera House; and a lieder programme performed with the pianist Babette Hierholzer at the Allensbach Festival, Germany.

Anando Mukerjee gave the orchestral world premiere of Ian Venables’ Venetian Songs accompanied by the Orchestra of St. John Bromsgrove which he repeated at the English Music Festival.

Mukerjee has also been featured by the BBC World Service, All India Radio & Radio 3 In-Tune.

On the oratorio stage Anando's repertoire encompasses Handel, Bach, Mendelssohn, Rossini, Gounod, Verdi and Puccini. As the tenor soloist he has appeared in Puccini's Messa di Gloria with the Birmingham Philharmonic Orchestra; in Verdi's Requiem and Rossini's Petite Messe Solennelle at the Great Hall, Dartington; in Stanford's Requiem with the Birmingham Choral Union; and in William Lloyd-Webber's The Saviour, performed in celebration of the composer's centenary at Westminster Central Hall.

Mukerjee is a self-supporting curate at St James Church, Muswell Hill, having trained for ordination at Wycliffe Hall, Oxford, completing his studies in 2025. He was made deacon by the Bishop of Ebbsfleet at St James's Church, Clerkenwell on 30 June 2025, and ordained priest at St John's Downshire Hill on 29 June 2026.
