= Ravi Shankar Prasad =

Indian politician and lawyer (born 1954)

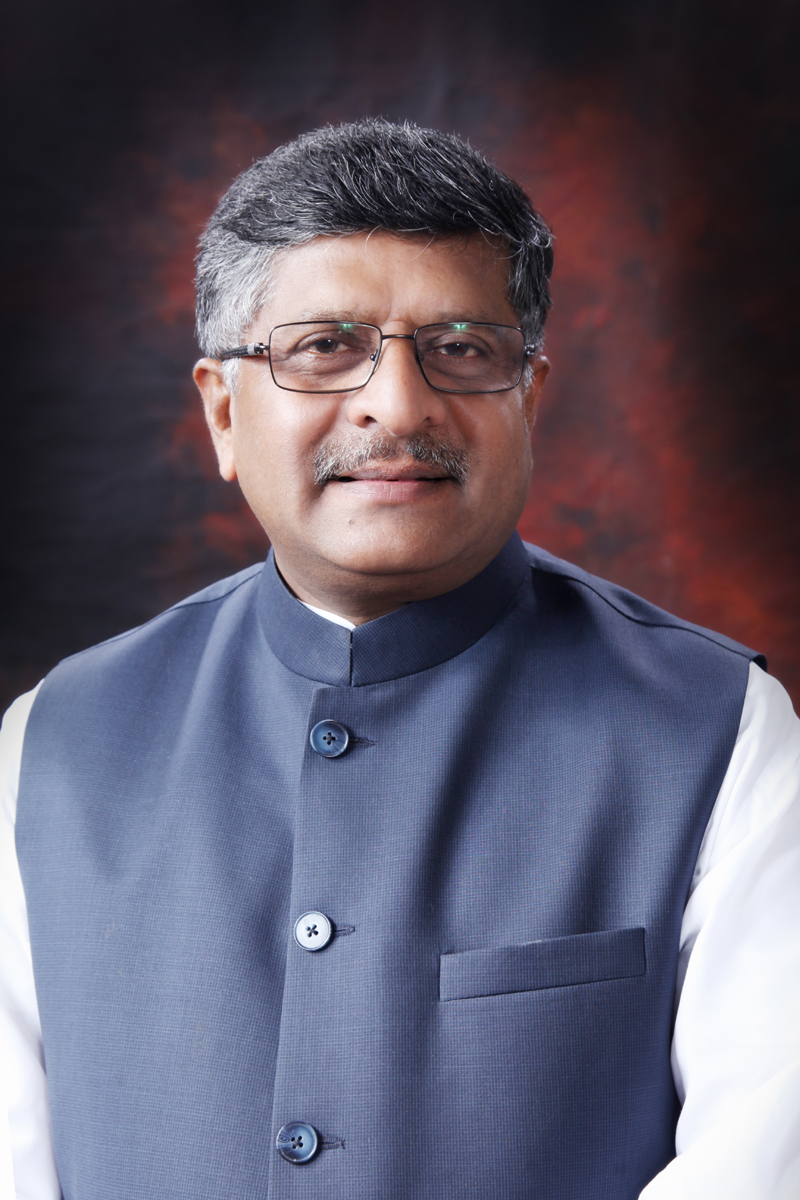
- Formal portrait, 2019

Member of Parliament, Lok Sabha
- Incumbent
- Assumed office 23 May 2019
- Preceded by: Shatrughan Sinha
Ministerial portfolios (during NDA government)
Union Minister of Communications Minister of Communications and Information Technology (2014‍–‍2016)
In office 31 May 2019 ‍–‍ 7 July 2021
Prime Minister	Narendra Modi
Preceded by	Manoj Sinha (Note: as MoS (I/C))
Succeeded by	Ashwini Vaishnaw
In office 27 May 2014 ‍–‍ 5 July 2016
Prime Minister	Narendra Modi
Preceded by	Kapil Sibal
Succeeded by	Manoj Sinha
Union Minister of Electronics and Information Technology
In office 5 July 2016 ‍–‍ 7 July 2021
Prime Minister	Narendra Modi
Preceded by	Office established (Note: Previously part of the department in the Communications ministry until July 2016 split into two ministries.)
Succeeded by	Ashwini Vaishnaw
Union Minister of Law and Justice
In office 5 July 2016 ‍–‍ 7 July 2021
Prime Minister	Narendra Modi
Preceded by	D. V. Sadananda Gowda
Succeeded by	Kiren Rijiju
In office 27 July 2014 ‍–‍ 26 November 2014
Prime Minister	Narendra Modi
Preceded by	Kapil Sibal
Succeeded by	D. V. Sadananda Gowda
Union Minister of State (Independent Charge) for Information and Broadcasting
In office 29 January 2003 ‍–‍ 22 May 2004
Prime Minister	Atal Bihari Vajpayee
Preceded by	Sushma Swaraj (as minister)
Succeeded by	S. Jaipal Reddy (as minister)
- Constituency: Patna Sahib, Bihar

Union Minister of State
- 2002‍–‍2003: Law and Justice
- 2001‍–‍2002: Coal; Mines

Member of Parliament, Rajya Sabha
- In office 3 April 2000 ‍–‍ 30 May 2019
- Constituency: Bihar

Personal details
- Born: 30 August 1954 (age 72) Patna, Bihar, India
- Party: Bharatiya Janata Party
- Spouse: Maya Shankar (m. 1982)
- Children: 2
- Education: Patna University (B.A, M.A, LL.B)
- Profession: Lawyer
- As of 26 June 2024

Ravi Shankar Prasad (born 30 August 1954) is an Indian politician and lawyer who served as 1st Minister of Electronics and Information Technology from 2016 to 2019 and 2019 to 2021. He is the member of Bharatiya Janata Party and Member of Parliament since 2000, first in the Rajya Sabha (2000–2019) and then in the Lok Sabha (since 2019), Prasad has served as Union Minister multiple times: As Minister of State, he served in the ministries of Coal (2001–2003), Law and Justice (2002–2003), and Information and Broadcasting (2003–2004) under Atal Bihari Vajpayee's premiership; as Cabinet Minister, he held the Law and Justice (2014, 2016–2021), Communications (2014–2016, 2019–2021) portfolios under Narendra Modi's premiership.

His term as Union Minister was marked with the repeal of 1500 archaic laws, handling of litigation over the purchase of Rafale fighter planes, and digitization of 15000 trial courts. On the other hand, his tenure also saw controversy over the proposed National Judicial Appointments Commission, constant friction between the judiciary and the executive, and rows with social media platforms Twitter and Facebook over local rules.

== Early life and education ==
He was born in Patna, Bihar. His father Thakur Prasad was a senior advocate at the Patna High Court and one of the leading founders of the Jan Sangh, the predecessor of the Bharatiya Janata Party. His sister Anuradha Prasad is the owner of BAG Films and Media Ltd, and the wife of Congress politician Rajeev Shukla.

Prasad earned BA Hons, MA (Political Science) and LL.B degrees from Patna University. He became a member of the Akhil Bharatiya Vidyarthi Parishad in 1969. Prasad participated in the student movement in Bihar led by Jayaprakash Narayan, and was imprisoned during the Emergency.

== Law career ==
Prasad has been practising at the Patna High Court (HC) since 1980. He was designated Senior Advocate at the Patna HC in 1999 and Senior Advocate at the Supreme Court of India in 2000. He was General Secretary of the People's Union for Civil Liberties in Bihar.

Prasad appeared in the Ram Janmabhoomi Ayodhya dispute representing the Hindu Mahasabha in the case. He defended Lal Krishna Advani in court when the latter was arrested in Bihar during his Rath Yatra in 1990. He was also the main lawyer arguing the PIL against former Bihar Chief Minister Lalu Prasad in the fodder scam that led to the jailing of several politicians and officials, including Lalu Yadav.

== Political career ==
Prasad began his political career as a student leader under the leadership of Jayaprakash Narayan in the 1970s, organising protests against Indira Gandhi's government.

=== Entry into the Bharatiya Janata Party ===
A loyalist of the Bharatiya Janata Party (BJP) from the beginning of his political career, Prasad was National Vice President of the Bharatiya Janata Yuva Morcha, the youth wing of the BJP, from 1991 to 1995. He became a Member of the BJP's National Executive Committee in 1995.

=== 2000-2004: Entry into Rajya Sabha and first ministerial roles ===
In April 2000, Prasad was elected to the Rajya Sabha, the upper house of the Indian Parliament for the first time. Under Atal Bihari Vajpayee's premiership, Prasad served as Minister of State in the ministries of Coal (2001–2003), where he was responsible for accelerating the coal and mining reforms; Law and Justice (2002–2003); and Information and Broadcasting (2003–2004). As Minister of Information and Broadcasting, he introduced reforms in the radio, television and animation sectors which improved their quality and functioning.

=== Opposition years ===
Prasad was appointed as a national spokesperson of the BJP in March 2006, and was later elevated to the post of its Chief National Spokesperson in 2007. In 2010, he became the party's general secretary.

Prasad was re-elected to the Rajya Sabha for a second term in April 2006 and for a third in April 2012. As an MP, he was part of various parliamentary committees, including a joint parliamentary committee to examine matters relating to 2G spectrum case from 2011 to 2013.

=== Under Narendra Modi's premiership ===
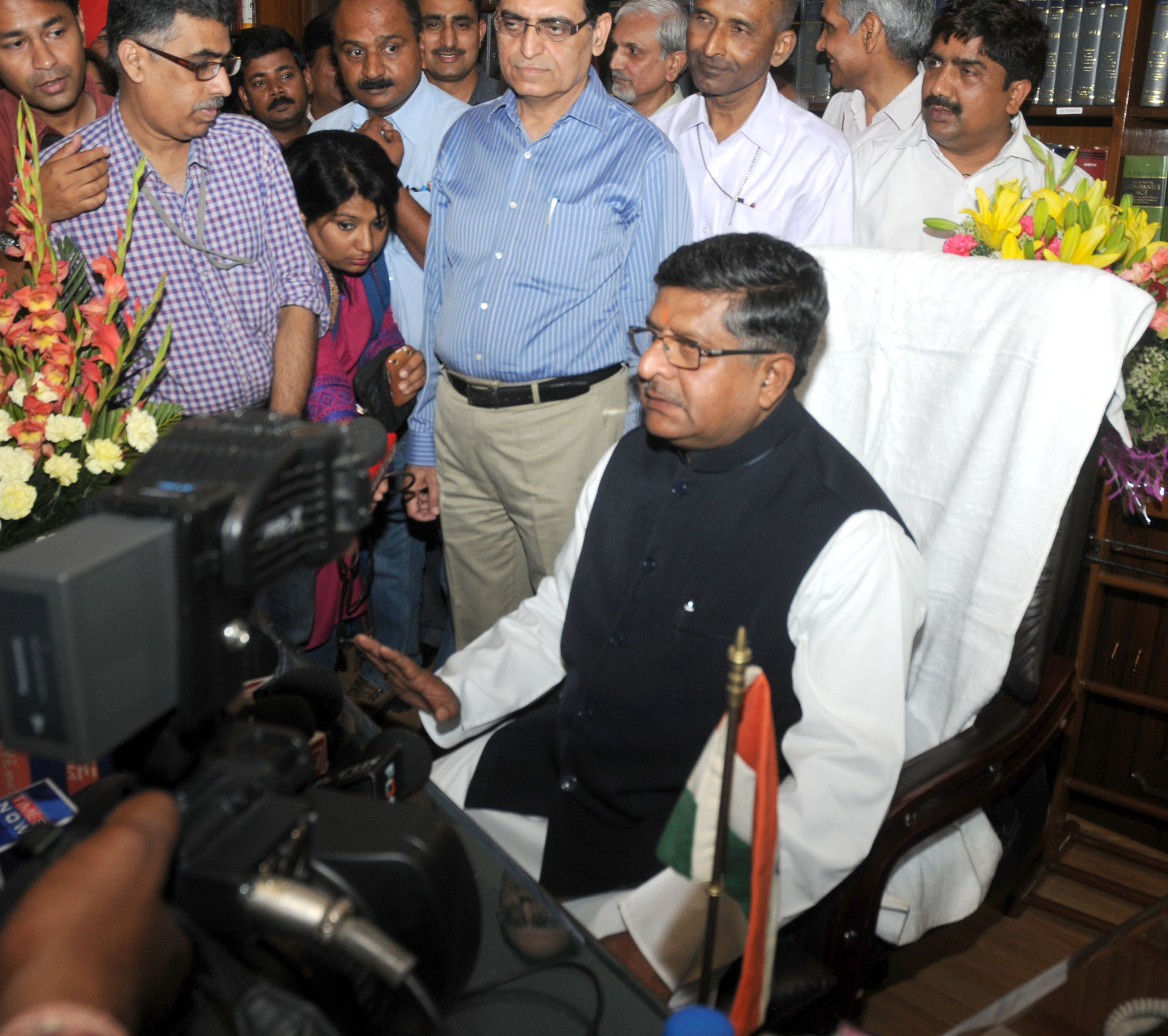
Ravi Shankar Prasad taking charge as the Union Minister for Law and Justice, in New Delhi on 27 May 2014.

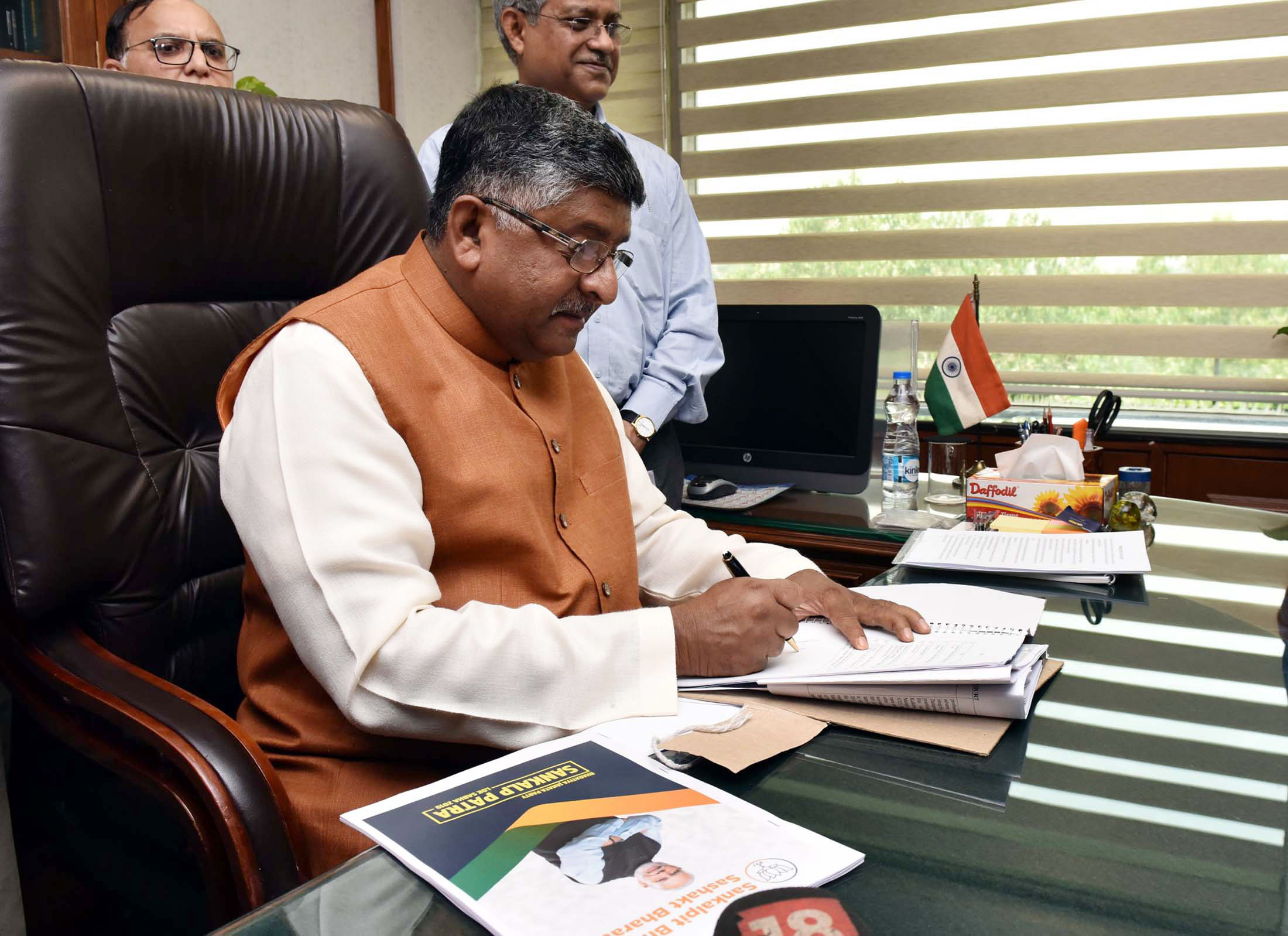
Ravi Shankar Prasad taking charge as the Union Minister for Law and Justice, in New Delhi on 3 June 2019.

With the BJP-led National Democratic Alliance's victory in the 2014 general election, Prasad rose to become part of the Narendra Modi Cabinet. He was appointed as Minister of Law and Justice and Minister for Communications and Information Technology on 27 May 2014. He would go on to serve three terms as Law Minister: 27 May to 9 November 2014; 5 July 2016 to 25 May 2019; and 30 May 2019 to 7 July 2021; a tenure of more than 5 years that was second only to that of Ashoke Sen. Prasad was Minister of Communications and IT till the ministry's bifurcation on 5 July 2016 into a Ministry of Communications and a Ministry of Electronics and Information Technology, following which he took charge of the latter. He was on the job till 25 May 2019, and again from 30 May 2019 to 7 July 2021. During the latter period, he also held the Communications portfolio.

==== NJAC and Judiciary-Executive faceoffs ====
One of Prasad's first acts after becoming Law Minister in 2014 was introducing legislation for the National Judicial Appointments Commission, which sought to reform the collegium system by which judges select candidates to be appointed as new judges. The collegium system had been criticised as opaque. The law was unanimously passed in Parliament and ratified by more than 20 states. However, in 2015, the Supreme Court of India struck it down, arguing that the Law Minister's presence in the Appointments Commission would cripple judicial independence.

The following year, the Law Ministry stalled many judges' appointments by objecting to various names recommended by the Supreme Court collegium. Prasad defended the executive in this faceoff with the judiciary by rolling out statistics showing an increased number of judges being appointed in the year 2016.

==== Triple talaq law ====
On 22 August 2017, the Supreme Court ruled the Muslim practice of instant divorce by uttering the word "talaq" thrice, called talaq-e-biddat or triple talaq, as "arbitrary and unconstitutional", violating women's right to equality, and not integral to Islam. Following this landmark verdict, the NDA government tabled The Muslim Women (Protection of Rights on Marriage) Bill in the Lok Sabha in December 2017, seeking to introduce a 3-year jail term for offenders. The opposition criticised the bill for attempting to criminalise a civil wrong, with Law Minister Prasad countering the charges. While the original bill lapsed due to lack of support in the Rajya Sabha, it was passed by both Houses of Parliament on reintroduction in 2019, becoming an Act after receiving Presidential assent on 1 August 2019. The passage of the bill despite the ruling NDA not having a majority in the Rajya Sabha was seen as a victory for Prasad and the government.

==== Digital India ====
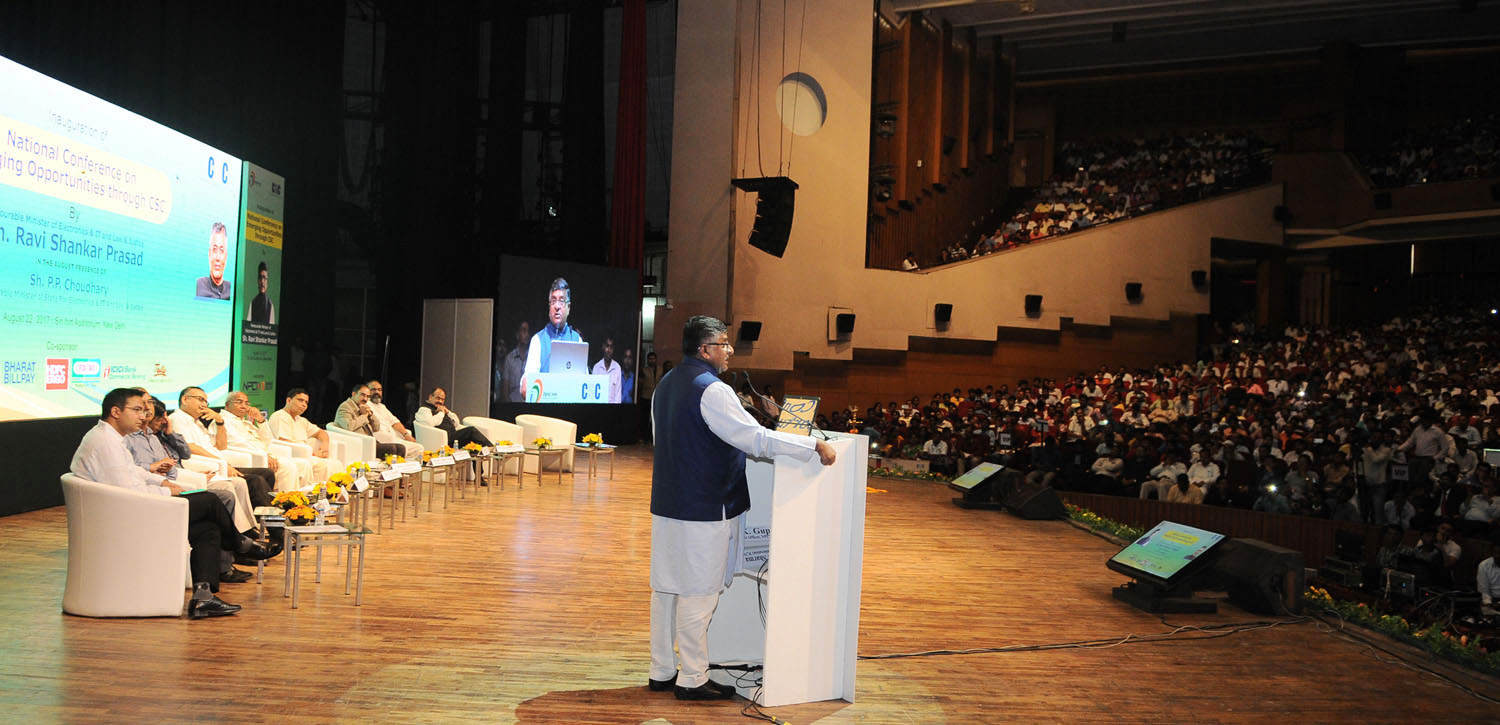
Ravi Shankar Prasad addressing at the inauguration of the National Conference on Emerging Opportunities through CSC

As Minister for Electronics and Information Technology, Prasad spearheaded the NDA government's flagship Digital India programme. Prasad himself has highlighted the common service centre scheme under Digital India, providing digital delivery of services and creating employment, as the biggest achievement of the government in the digital technology sector. He has also pointed out the establishment of business processing and outsourcing units (BPOs) in far-flung areas and the growth of electronic manufacturing units in India as successful government efforts. The UK-based NGO Apolitical adjudged him as one of the top twenty leaders in the list of 100 most influential people in Digital Government in 2018.

In 2018, Prasad was placed among the top twenty influential world leaders in digital technology and e-government, with his role in the Digital India programme and support for net neutrality.

==== Start-up India Initiatives ====
Prasad took the lead in advancing India's startup ecosystem and pioneered the organization of groundbreaking townhall meetings. These meetings provided a platform for assessing the distinctive requirements of the startup community, and Prasad played a pivotal role in shaping government policies and initiatives designed to bolster the support for startups in the nation.

==== Comments on Indian economy ====
In October 2019, Prasad tried to defend the condition of the Indian economy by commenting that "the holiday of October 2 saw earning[s] of over Rs 120 crore by three movies – War, Joker and Sye Raa", indicating that "[t]he economy is sound". He also claimed that an NSSO report on unemployment was false. The comment came on the back of industrial output figures released by the government showing how factory output had shrunk by 1.1% in August, recording the poorest performance in seven years. The World Bank had also pointed out the country's widening current account deficit and predicted a further slowdown in economic growth. After coming under sharp criticism from the opposition Congress and CPIM, Prasad withdrew the comment, stating it had been taken out of context.

==== Clashes with 'Big Tech' ====
Prasad has openly supported the cause of net neutrality, insisting that internet access "is not negotiable" and “walled gardens cannot be allowed”. As Minister for Communications and IT, Prasad had denied Facebook permission for its Free Basics platform in India in 2016, saying it provided access to only a host of websites and services, while excluding the broader internet from its purview.

On 25 February, the Information Technology (Intermediary Guidelines and Digital Media Ethics Code) Rules, 2021 were notified, seeking to regulate social media intermediaries and to tackle misuse of social media. However, Prasad and his Ministry were soon drawn into a bitter spat with Big Tech companies, especially Twitter, over the implementation of these local laws. The tussle escalated as the government removed Twitter's legal protection in India as an "intermediary" on 16 June over its failure to comply with the new IT rules, while Twitter temporarily locked Prasad's official handle on its platform due to a copyright violation.

In Lok Sabha 2024 Ravi Shankar Prasad has won in Patna Sahib Lok Sabha constituency. He has defeated Dr. Anshul Avijit by about 1.5 lakh votes.

== Personal life ==
On 3 February 1982, Prasad married Maya Shankar, who is a Historian and Professor of History at Patna University.

== See also ==
- List of politicians from Bihar

Lok Sabha
Preceded by Shatrughan Sinha	Member of Parliament for Patna Sahib; 2019 – Present	Succeeded by Incumbent
Political offices
Preceded by Sushma Swaraj	Minister of Information and Broadcasting; 29 January 2003 - 13 May 2004; As Minister of State (Independent Charge)	Succeeded by Jaipal Reddy
Preceded by Kapil Sibal	Minister of Law and Justice; 26 May 2014 – 9 November 2014	Succeeded by D. V. Sadananda Gowda
Preceded by Kapil Sibal	Minister of Communications and Information Technology; 26 May 2014 – 5 July 2016	Succeeded by Ministry split into Communications and Information Technology
Preceded by Ministry did not exist	Minister of Electronics and Information Technology; 5 July 2016 - 7 July 2021	Succeeded by Ashwini Vaishnaw
Preceded by Ministry did not exist	Minister of Communication; 5 July 2016 - 7 July 2021	Succeeded by Ashwini Vaishnaw
Preceded by D. V. Sadananda Gowda	Minister of Law and Justice; 5 July 2016 – 7 July 2021	Succeeded by Kiren Rijiju
