= Amita Das =

Indian plasma physicist

- அமிதா தாசு
- Born: 3 August 1965 (age 60); Patna, Bihar, India
- Education: Indian Institute of Technology, Kanpur (Ph.D.)
- Awards: J. C. Bose Fellowship
- Scientific career
- Fields: Laser physics, Plasma physics
- Institutions: Institute for Plasma Research, Indian Institute of Technology Delhi
- Thesis: (1990)

Amita Das (Tamil: அமிதா தாசு, born 3 August 1965) is an Indian plasma physicist. She is currently a professor at the Indian Institute of Technology Delhi. Her research interests are in laser-plasma interactions, nonlinear plasmas, plasma turbulence and the properties of strongly coupled and dusty plasma systems.

== Early life and career ==
Das obtained her Ph.D. from the Indian Institute of Technology, Kanpur in 1990. Upon graduation, she then worked at the Institute for Plasma Research and eventually became a professor in 1998 while serving as its Dean between 2014 and 2017. In December 2018, Das moved to the Physics Department of the Indian Institute of Technology Delhi.

In February 2014, Das was a visiting professor at the University of Calcutta.

== Scientific contributions ==
In February 2020, Das delivered the DAE-C. V. Raman Lecture of the Indian Physics Association held at Indian Institute of Technology Patna.

Das is currently a Fellowship Scrutiny Committee member of the National Academy of Sciences, India and an editor of Physics Letters A.

== Honors and awards ==
Das is an elected fellow of the Indian Academy of Sciences (2011), the National Academy of Sciences, India (2015), and the Indian National Science Academy (2019). She is also a fellow of the Gujrat Science Academy.

Das is the recipient of the J. C. Bose Fellowship.

In March 2015, Das was honored with a women achievers award at a function in Ahmedabad, India.
