= Manipur Public Service Commission =

State government agency

Constitutional body overview
- Formed: 21 October 1972
- Jurisdiction: Manipur
- Headquarters: North A.O.C, DM Road, Near Hotel Imphal, Imphal, Manipur-795001; 24.817938°N 93.944698°E
- Constitutional body executives: S.S. Puri IAS, Chairman; Dr. Lokho Puni, IFS(Retd), Member; Vacant, Member; Neeta Arambam, IAS, Secretary
- Website: mpscmanipur.gov.in

The Manipur Public Service Commission (MPSC) is a constitutional body of the state of Manipur, India, responsible for the recruitment of candidates for various state government jobs through competitive examinations. It also gives concurrence on the recommendation of the Departmental Promotion Committee for appointment to various posts. The Commission also gives concurrence on the framing/ amendment of Recruitment Rules. It also tenders advice to the government departments on service matters including disciplinary cases.

== Organisation ==
The Manipur Public Service Commission is constituted in pursuance of Article 315 of the Constitution of India and it has been functioning at Imphal since 1972. The Commission consists of a chairman and two members.

Directory of Chairman

Sl.No.	Name	Designation	Date	Remarks
1.	G.B.K Hooja	Chairman	21.10.1972	Retired on 31.01.1975
2.	Sibo Larho	Chairman i/c	01.02.1975	Retired on 13.11.1975
3.	D. Krishna Ayyar	Chairman	14.11.1975	Retired on 12.04.1980
4.	K. Gourkishore	Chairman	12.06.1980	Retired on 10.11.1980
5.	M. Meghachandra Singh	Chairman	10.01.1981	Retired on 28.02.1985
6.	H. Bhubon Singh	Chairman	01.03.1985	Retired on 19.01.1987
7.	M. Raikhan	Chairman	19.01.1987	Retired on 31.12.1987
8.	Y. Radheshyam Singh	Chairman	01.01.1988	Retired on 01.03.1991
9.	S.L. Singson	Chairman	01.03.1991	Retired on 28.02.1994
10.	I. Bijoy Singh	Chairman i/c	01.03.1994	Resigned on 24.01.1996
11.	Dr. R.K. Thekho i/c	Chairman	12.02.1997	Retired on 02.04.1997
12.	B.R. Basu	Chairman	03.04.1997	Resigned on 31.01.1999
13.	I.S. Khaidem	Chairman	25.06.1999	Retired on 31.08.2000
14.	Paokhokai Haokip	Chairman	09.02.2001	Retired on 30.06.2002
15.	T. Guite	Chairman	01.03.2003	Retired on 31.12.2003
16.	E. Binoykumar Singh	Chairman i/c	01.01.2004	Retired on 29.02.2004
17.	Dr. H. Nungshi Devi	Chairman i/c	01.03.2004	Retired on 28.02.2005
18.	Dr. Amarjit Lukram	Chairman	18.05.2005	Retired on 30.06.2009
19.	Rakesh	Chairman	04.11.2009	Retired on 30.06.2009
20.	Henry K. Heni(I/C)	Chairman	16.12.2010	Retired on 31.12.2010
21.	Dr. S. Singsit	Chairman	12.04.2011	Retired on 28.02,2013
22.	Dhruv Vijai Singh	Chairman	17.04.2013	Retired on 26.01.2015
23.	Dilip Sinha	Chairman	03.07.2015	Retired on 07.11.2016
24.	Lt Gen Dr. K Himalay Singh	Chairman	17.05.2017	Retired on 28.02.2019
25.	Shri W.L. Hangshing, IAS (Retd.)	Chairman (i/c)	28.02.2019	05.08.2019
26.	[Lt. Gen. L. Nishikanta Singh, VSM & BAR (Retd.)]	Chairman	05.08.2019	Retired on 20.11.2020
27.	[Shri T. Guite, IPS (Retd)]	Chairman (i/c)	06.04.2021	23.11.2021
28.	[Shri Laisram Angam Chand Singh, IA&AS (Retd)]	Chairman	23.11.2021	Retired on 04.10.2023

== Historical Perspective ==
The Maharaja: During the British regime, the Maharja used to appoint the functionaries of the state. The Rules of Management of the State of Manipur, enforced on 14 September 1935, empowered the Maharaja to appoint the members of the Durbar, while a British officer acted as the president of the Durbar. After independence, for a brief period, the Manipur State Constituent Act 1947 provided for the formation of a Manipur State Appointment Board to be the "final authority" in all matters of appointments and promotions.

The Chief Commissioner: Following merger into the Indian Union on 15 October 1949, Manipur became a centrally administered area, and remained so till 31 October 1956. During this period, the Chief Commissioner appointed the functionaries of Manipur, subject to the control of the Central Government.

Territorial Council: Manipur became a Union Territory under the States’ Re-Organisation Act 1956 and Constitution (Seventh Amendment) Act 1956. Under the Territorial Council Act 1956 Manipur was allowed to constitute the Territorial Council with limited administrative powers over transferred subjects and appointment of officials thereto. The Chief Commissioner, however, continued to function as the Chief appointing authority of the territory. Subsequently, the Territorial Council was abolished, and Manipur was placed under the Chief Commissioner from 11 May 1963 onwards with a Territorial Legislative Assembly and a Council of Ministers to assist him. Manipur attained statehood on 21 January 1972 under the North- East Area (Re-organisation) Act 1971.

Manipur Public Service Commission: Under Article 315(4) of the Constitution, the Union Public Service Commission (UPSC) agreed to function as the Public Service Commission of the State of Manipur till 21 October 1972.

On 3 October 1972 the Governor of Manipur issued the order of constitution of the Manipur Public Service Commission under Article 318 with one Chairman and two Members. Shri B.K. Nehru, Governor of Manipur inaugurated the office of the Manipur Public Service Commission at a glittering function on 23 October 1972 at the Gandhi Memorial Hall, Imphal. Chief Minister, Shri Alimuddin presided over the function.

The Pioneering Brains: Shri G.B.K. Hooja MA, IAS was the inaugural Chairman of the Commission, while Shri Laishram Gopal Singh BA(Hon.), IPS and Shri Sibo Larho BA were the premiere members. Shri Karam Gourakishore Singh was the first Secretary of the Manipur Public Service Commission.

The Commission was housed in the Old Secretariat Building Complex for almost nine years; it was later shifted to the present location in January, 1981. Over the years, Manipur Public Service Commission have grown in stature with a senior IAS officer as the Secretary and an adequate number of officers and ancillary staff.

== Functions of the Manipur Public Service Commission ==
Article 320 of the Constitution of India lays down the functions of the State Public Service Commission. The functions of the State Public Service Commission are :

- It is the duty of the State Public Service Commission to conduct examinations for appointment to the services of the state.
- The State Public Service Commission will be consulted by the State Government on the following issues.
  - on all matters relating to methods of recruitment to government posts;
  - on the principles to be followed while making appointments, promotions and transfers of employees;
  - on all disciplinary matters of a person serving the Government of a state in a civil capacity, including memorials or petitions relating to such matters;
  - on any claim by a person, who is serving or has served the Government in a civil capacity that any cost, incurred by him in defending legal proceedings instituted against him in respect of acts done or purporting to have been done in the execution of his duty, shall be paid out of the consolidated fund of the state;
  - on any claim for the award of a pension in respect of injuries sustained by a person while serving under the Government in a civil capacity and any question as to the amount of any such award.

The State Public Service Commission functions as an advisory body. It is the duty of the State Public Service Commission to advise on any matter, referred to it by the Government.

== See also ==
- List of Public service commissions in India
