= Patna Sahib Assembly constituency =

Assembly constituency in Bihar, India

- Constituency No. 184 for the Bihar Legislative Assembly

Constituency details
- Country: India
- Region: East India
- State: Bihar
- District: Patna
- Established: 2008
- Total electors: 389,881
- Reservation: None

Member of Legislative Assembly
- 18th Bihar Legislative Assembly
- Incumbent Ratnesh Kumar Kushwaha
- Party: BJP
- Alliance: NDA
- Elected year: 2025

Patna Sahib Assembly constituency is one of 243 constituencies of legislative assembly of Bihar. It comes under Patna Sahib Lok Sabha constituency.

== Members of the Legislative Assembly ==
Year	Name	Party
Before 2008: see Patna East
2010	Nand Kishore Yadav	Bharatiya Janata Party
2015	Nand Kishore Yadav	Bharatiya Janata Party
2020	Nand Kishore Yadav	Bharatiya Janata Party
2025	Ratnesh Kumar Kushwaha	Bharatiya Janata Party

== Election results ==
=== 2025 ===
Bihar Legislative Assembly Election, 2025: Patna Sahib
Party	Candidate	Votes	%	±%
BJP	Ratnesh Kumar Kushwaha	130,366	55.44	+3.53
INC	Shashant Shekhar	91,466	38.9	−3.29
JSP	Vinita Mishra	5,263	2.24	
NOTA	None of the above	2,099	0.89	−0.83
Majority		38,900	16.54	+6.82
Turnout		235,152	60.31	+8.08
BJP hold		Swing		

=== 2020 ===
2020 Bihar Legislative Assembly election: Patna Sahib
Party	Candidate	Votes	%	±%
BJP	Nand Kishore Yadav	97,692	51.91	+5.02
INC	Pravin Singh	79,392	42.19	
NOTA	None of the above	3,234	1.72	+1.01
Majority		18,300	9.72	+8.23
Turnout		188,189	52.23	−3.04
BJP hold		Swing		

=== 2015 ===
2015 Bihar Legislative Assembly election: Patna Sahib
Party	Candidate	Votes	%	±%
BJP	Nand Kishore Yadav	88,108	46.89	
RJD	Santosh Mehta	85,316	45.4	
SS	Nandu Kumar	2,694	1.43	
RSP	Virendra Thakur	1,857	0.99	
NOTA	None of the above	1,332	0.71	
Majority		2,792	1.49	
Turnout		187,903	55.27	
BJP hold		Swing		

=== 2010 ===
2010 Bihar Legislative Assembly election: Patna Sahib
Party	Candidate	Votes	%	±%
BJP	Nand Kishore Yadav	91,419	68.07	
INC	Parvej Ahmad	26,082	19.42	
RJD	Rajesh Kumar	8,271	6.16	
Independent	Mithilesh Kumar	1,493	1.11	
CPI(ML)L	Ram Narayan Singh	1,230	0.92	
Majority		65,337	48.65	
Turnout		1,34,301	45.86	
BJP win (new seat)				

== See also ==
- List of Assembly constituencies of Bihar
