= Kumhrar Assembly constituency =

Assembly constituency in Bihar, India

Coordinates: 25°38′28″N 85°5′26″E

Kumhrar
- Constituency No. 183 for the Bihar Legislative Assembly

Constituency details
- Country: India
- Region: East India
- State: Bihar
- District: Patna
- Lok Sabha constituency: Patna Sahib
- Established: 2008
- Total electors: 431,390
- Reservation: None

Member of Legislative Assembly
- 18th Bihar Legislative Assembly
- Incumbent Sanjay Kumar Gupta
- Party: BJP
- Alliance: NDA
- Elected year: 2025

Kumhrar is one of 243 constituencies of legislative assembly of Bihar. It comes under Patna Sahib Lok Sabha constituency. In the 2015 Bihar Legislative Assembly election, Kumhrar was one of the 36 seats to have VVPAT enabled electronic voting machines. Kumhrar was initially called Patna Central assembly constituency, but after delimitation it was renamed as Kumhrar assembly constituency. This Constituency and seat is dominated by Kayastha Caste.

== Overview ==
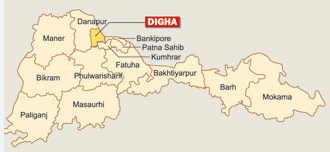
Kumhrar Assembly constituency in Patna district

Kumhrar comprises Ward Nos. 14 & 16 to 22 in PMC and OG of Patna Rural CD Block.

== Members of the Legislative Assembly ==
Year	Name	Party
Before 2008: See Patna Central
2010	Arun Kumar Sinha	Bharatiya Janata Party
2015	Arun Kumar Sinha	Bharatiya Janata Party
2020	Arun Kumar Sinha	Bharatiya Janata Party
2025	Sanjay Kumar Gupta	Bharatiya Janata Party

== Election results ==
=== 2025 ===
2025 Bihar Legislative Assembly election: Kumhrar
Party	Candidate	Votes	%	±%
BJP	Sanjay Kumar Gupta	100,485	57.91	▲3.91
INC	Indradeep Chandravanshi	52,961	30.52	
JSP	Prof. K. C. Sinha	15,017	8.66	
NOTA	None of the above	1,278	0.74	▼0.29
Majority		47,524	27.39	▲9.83
Turnout		173,506	40.22	▲4.95
BJP hold		Swing		

=== 2020 ===
Bihar Legislative Assembly Election, 2020: Kumhrar
Party	Candidate	Votes	%	±%
BJP	Arun Kumar Sinha	81,400	54.0	−2.25
RJD	Dharamendra Kumar	54,937	36.44	
JAP(L)	Rajesh Ranjan Pappu	4,333	2.87	
NOTA	None of the above	1,558	1.03	+0.48
Majority		26,463	17.56	−6.32
Turnout		150,744	35.27	−2.94
BJP hold		Swing		

=== 2015 ===
Bihar Assembly election, 2015: Kumhrar
Party	Candidate	Votes	%	±%
BJP	Arun Kumar Sinha	87,792	56.25	
INC	Aquil Haider	50,517	32.37	
SS	Sumit Ranjan Sinha	3,123	2.0	
Independent	Ajay Verma	2,964	1.9	
NOTA	None of the above	860	0.55	
Majority		37,275	23.88	
Turnout		156,067	38.21	
BJP hold		Swing		

=== 2010 ===
Bihar Assembly election, 2010: Kumhrar
Party	Candidate	Votes	%	±%
BJP	Arun Kumar Sinha	83,425	72.04	
LJP	Md. Kamal Parwez	15,617	13.49	
INC	Kapildeo Prasad Yadav	9,254	7.99	
CPI(M)	Bindeshwari Prasad	1,618	1.40	
Independent	Balram Patel	874	0.75	
Majority		67,808	58.55	
Turnout		1,15,804	37.33	
BJP win (new seat)				

== See also ==
- List of Assembly constituencies of Bihar
- Kumhrar
