= Nand Kishore Yadav =

Indian politician (born 1953)

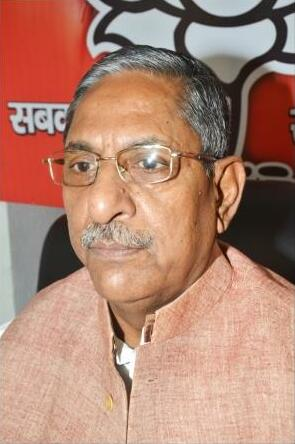
- Yadav, c. 2014

23rd Governor of Nagaland
- Incumbent
- Assumed office 13 March 2026
- Chief Minister: Neiphiu Rio
- Preceded by: Ajay Kumar Bhalla

Minister of Public Works Department of Bihar
- In office 29 July 2017 – 16 November 2020
- Chief Minister: Nitish Kumar
- Preceded by: Tejashwi Yadav
- Succeeded by: Mangal Pandey
- In office 26 November 2010 – 16 June 2013
- Chief Minister: Nitish Kumar
- In office 24 November 2005 – 13 April 2008
- Chief Minister: Nitish Kumar
- Succeeded by: Prem Kumar

Leader of the Opposition in Bihar Legislative Assembly
- In office 19 June 2013 – 4 December 2015
- Chief Minister: Nitish Kumar; Jitan Ram Manjhi; Nitish Kumar
- Preceded by: Abdul Bari Siddiqui
- Succeeded by: Prem Kumar

Minister of Health & Family Welfare of Bihar
- In office 13 April 2008 – 26 November 2010
- Chief Minister: Nitish Kumar
- Preceded by: Chandra Mohan Rai
- Succeeded by: Ashwini Kumar Choubey

Minister of Tourism of Bihar
- In office 24 November 2005 – 13 April 2008
- Chief Minister: Nitish Kumar
- Succeeded by: Rampravesh Rai

Member of Bihar Legislative Assembly
- In office 1995–2025
- Preceded by: Mahtab Lal Singh
- Succeeded by: Ratnesh Kumar Kushwaha
- Constituency: Patna Sahib

17th Speaker of the Bihar Legislative Assembly
- In office 15 February 2024 – 14 November 2025
- Chief Minister: Nitish Kumar
- Succeeded by: Prem Kumar

Personal details
- Born: 26 August 1953 (age 73) Patna, Bihar, India
- Party: Bharatiya Janata Party (since 1983)
- Education: Bachelor of Science
- Alma mater: Patna University
- Occupation: Politician
- Website: nandkishoreyadav.com

Nand Kishore Yadav (born 26 August 1953) is an Indian politician, who serving as the 23rd Governor of Nagaland since 13 March 2026. He was former cabinet minister for road construction and health in the Government of Bihar. He is a member of the Bharatiya Janata Party and member of Rashtriya Swayamsevak Sangh (RSS). He is a senior BJP leader who joined, as minister, the Bihar Government after the split of the Mahagathbandhan and parting of ways between RJD and JDU in June 2013. Before that, he was cabinet minister for road construction and tourism and the leader of the opposition in the Bihar Assembly, at present Chairman- Prakalan Samiti (Bihar Vidhan Sabha). He is served as the seventeenth Speaker of Bihar Legislative Assembly from 2024 till 2025.

== Family background, early life and education ==
Yadav was born on 26 August 1953 to the Panna Lal Yadav and Rajkumari Yadav. His great-grandfather, Jhalo Sardar, was a landlord. There was a myth saying that he used to pet lions. His grandfather, Ramdas Rai, spent the family inheritance, mainly on keeping and breeding birds. (Yadav is quoted as saying, "Hum sher se chidiyon per aagaye"). His father had to restart from scratch and set up a business in the Khajekalan area of old Patna, where he was born and spent his childhood.

== Positions held ==
#	Assumed office	Left Office	Term Length	Positions
1	1978	1978	Less than 1 year	Councillor, Patna Municipal Corporation
2	1982	1982	Less than 1 year	Deputy Mayor, Patna Municipal Corporation
3	1990	1995	Less than 5 year	State President of Bharatiya Janata Yuva Morcha, Bihar
4	1995	1998	Less than 3 year	General Secretary of Bharatiya Janata Party, Bihar
5	1998	2003	5 years	President of Bharatiya Janata Party, Bihar
6	1995	2010	15 years	Member of Bihar Legislative Assembly from Patna East
7	2010	2025	15 years	Member of Bihar Legislative Assembly from Patna Sahib Assembly
8	24 November 2005	13 April 2008	2 years, 141 days	Minister of Road Construction & Tourism, Government of Bihar
9	13 April 2008	26 November 2010	2 years, 227 days	Minister of Health & Family Welfare, Government of Bihar
10	2010	2013	3 years	Minister of Road Construction, Government of Bihar
11	19 June 2013	4 December 2015	2 years, 168 days	Leader of Opposition in the Bihar Legislative Assembly
12	29 July 2017	16 November 2020	3 years, 110 days	Minister of Road Construction, Government of Bihar
13	15 February 2024	1 December 2025	1 year, 289 days	Speaker of the Bihar Legislative Assembly
14	13 March 2026	Incumbent	228 days	Governor of Nagaland

== See also ==
- List of politicians from Bihar
