= Arun Kumar Sinha (politician) =

Indian politician

Member of Bihar Legislative Assembly
- In office 2010–2025
- Preceded by: Constituency established
- Succeeded by: Sanjay Kumar Gupta
- Constituency: Kumhrar
- In office 2005–2010
- Preceded by: Sushil Kumar Modi
- Succeeded by: Constituency defunct
- Constituency: Patna Central

Personal details
- Born: 1 May 1951 (age 74) Siwan, Bihar, India
- Party: Bharatiya Janata Party
- Occupation: Politician

Arun Kumar Sinha is an Indian politician and a Member of the Bharatiya Janata Party from Bihar. Sinha has won the Bihar Legislative Assembly election in 2005, 2010, 2015 and in 2020 from Kumhrar Assembly constituency. His son Ashish Sinha is an Indian Cricketer, Politician and Advocate.
