= Rama Nand Yadav =

Indian politician

Ramanand Yadav

Member of Bihar Legislative Assembly
- Incumbent
- Assumed office 2010
- Preceded by: Arun Manjhi
- Constituency: Fatuha

Personal details
- Born: 20 February 1955 (age 71) Fatuha, India
- Party: Rashtriya Janata Dal
- Education: Patna University; Magadh University
- Profession: Politician

Dr. Ramanand Yadav is an Indian politician. He was elected to the Bihar Legislative Assembly six times from Patna East, Danapur and Fatuha (Vidhan Sabha constituency) as the 2020 Member of Bihar Legislative Assembly as a member of the Rashtriya Janata Dal. He was the Minister of Mines and Geology in Bihar Government during RJDs coalition government.
