= Nitin Nabin =

Indian politician (born 1980)

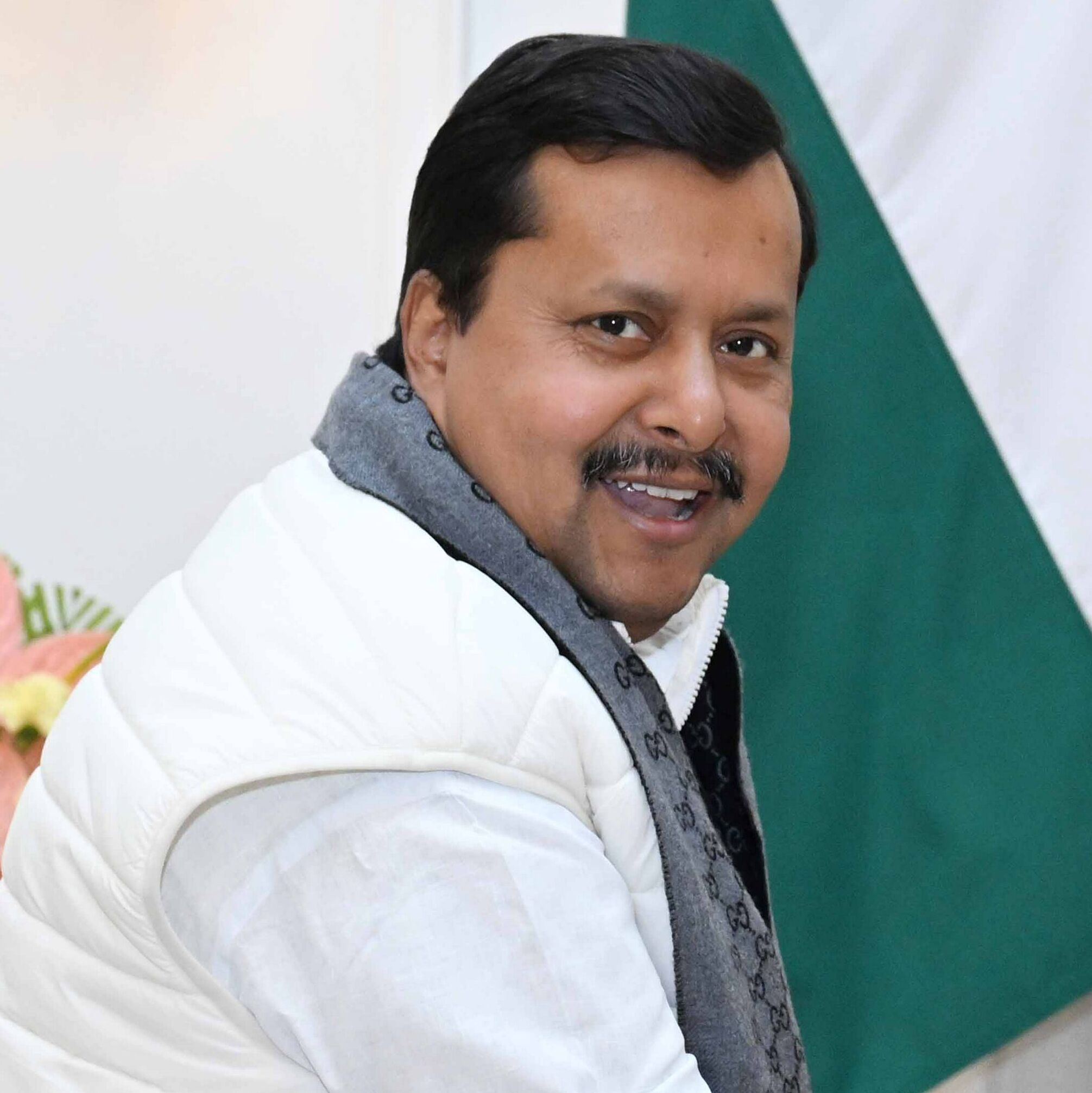
- Nabin in 2025

11th National President of the Bharatiya Janata Party
- Incumbent
- Assumed office 20 January 2026
- Preceded by: Jagat Prakash Nadda

National Working President of Bharatiya Janata Party
- In office 15 December 2025 – 10 January 2026
- Preceded by: Jagat Prakash Nadda

Member of Parliament, Rajya Sabha
- Incumbent
- Assumed office 10 April 2026
- Preceded by: Prem Chand Gupta
- Constituency: Bihar

Minister of Road Construction of Bihar
- In office 26 February 2025 – 16 December 2025
- Chief Minister: Nitish Kumar
- Preceded by: Vijay Kumar Sinha
- Succeeded by: Dilip Kumar Jaiswal
- In office 9 February 2021 – 9 August 2022
- Chief Minister: Nitish Kumar
- Preceded by: Mangal Pandey
- Succeeded by: Tejashwi Yadav

Minister of Urban Development & Housing of Bihar
- In office 20 November 2025 – 16 December 2025
- Chief Minister: Nitish Kumar
- Preceded by: Jibesh Kumar
- Succeeded by: Vijay Kumar Sinha
- In office 15 March 2024 – 26 February 2025
- Chief Minister: Nitish Kumar
- Preceded by: Tejashwi Yadav
- Succeeded by: Jibesh Kumar

Minister of Law & Justice of Bihar
- In office 15 March 2024 – 26 February 2025
- Chief Minister: Nitish Kumar
- Preceded by: Shamim Ahmad
- Succeeded by: Mangal Pandey

Member of Bihar Legislative Assembly
- In office 24 November 2010 – 30 March 2026
- Preceded by: Constituency established
- Succeeded by: Prashant Kishor
- Constituency: Bankipur
- In office 11 May 2006 – 24 November 2010
- Preceded by: Nabin Kishore Prasad Sinha
- Succeeded by: Constituency abolished
- Constituency: Patna West

Personal details
- Born: Nitin Nabin Sinha; 23 May 1980 (age 46) Ranchi, Bihar, India (present-day Jharkhand)
- Party: Bharatiya Janata Party
- Spouse: Dr. Deepmala Shrivastava
- Occupation: Politician

Nitin Nabin (born 23 May 1980) is an Indian politician, political organiser, and activist who has been serving as the 16th national president of the Bharatiya Janata Party (BJP) since January 2026 and an MP in the upper chamber of the Indian Parliament, the Rajya Sabha since April 2026. He was the national working president of the Bharatiya Janata Party from December 2025 to January 2026. He is the youngest president of the party, rising to the post at the age of 45. He also served as a minister in the Nitish Kumar–led Government of Bihar, holding the Ministry of Road Construction portfolio from 2024 to 2025 and Ministry of Urban housing and development and Ministry of Law and Justice. He represented the Bankipur constituency in the Bihar Legislative Assembly.

== Early life and education ==
Nitin Nabin Sinha was born on 23 May 1980 in Ranchi, Jharkhand in a Hindu Chitraguptavanshi Ambashtha Kayastha family. He is the son of veteran BJP leader and former MLA Nabin Kishore Prasad Sinha. Following his father's death in 2006, he entered active electoral politics.

He completed his intermediate education in 1998 from C. S. K. M. Public School, Delhi. Nitin Nabin is also an alumnus of Gyan Niketan Patna

== Political career ==
Nabin won his first election in a by-election from Patna West in 2006 and became a Member of the Bihar Legislative Assembly.

After constituency delimitation, he began representing the Bankipur seat. He has been re-elected in the 2010, 2015, 2020 and 2025 Bihar Legislative Assembly elections. In the 2025 election, he secured 98,299 votes and defeated Rashtriya Janata Dal candidate Rekha Kumari by a margin of 51,936 votes.

Nabin has held multiple ministerial portfolios in the Government of Bihar. He served as Minister of Road Construction from February 2021 to August 2022 and was reappointed to the same portfolio in February 2025 and served till December 2025. Between March 2024 and February 2025, he served as Minister of Urban Development & Housing and Minister of Law & Justice. His tenure had included initiatives related to road infrastructure, urban housing and welfare measures such as support for journalists and incentives for ASHA and Mamta workers.

In March 2026, BJP nominated Nabin as a candidate for Bihar in the 2026 Rajya Sabha elections, which he ultimately won. He assumed office in April.

== Party organisation roles ==
Nabin has held several organisational positions within the BJP. He has served as National General Secretary of the Bharatiya Janata Yuva Morcha (BJYM) and State President of BJYM Bihar. During his association with BJYM, he participated in youth mobilisation campaigns, including the National Unity Yatra in Jammu and Kashmir and a tribute march from Guwahati to Tawang commemorating the martyrs of the 1965 war. He has also served as BJP in-charge for Sikkim and as co-in-charge for Chhattisgarh, contributing to organisational activities and electoral campaigns in those states.

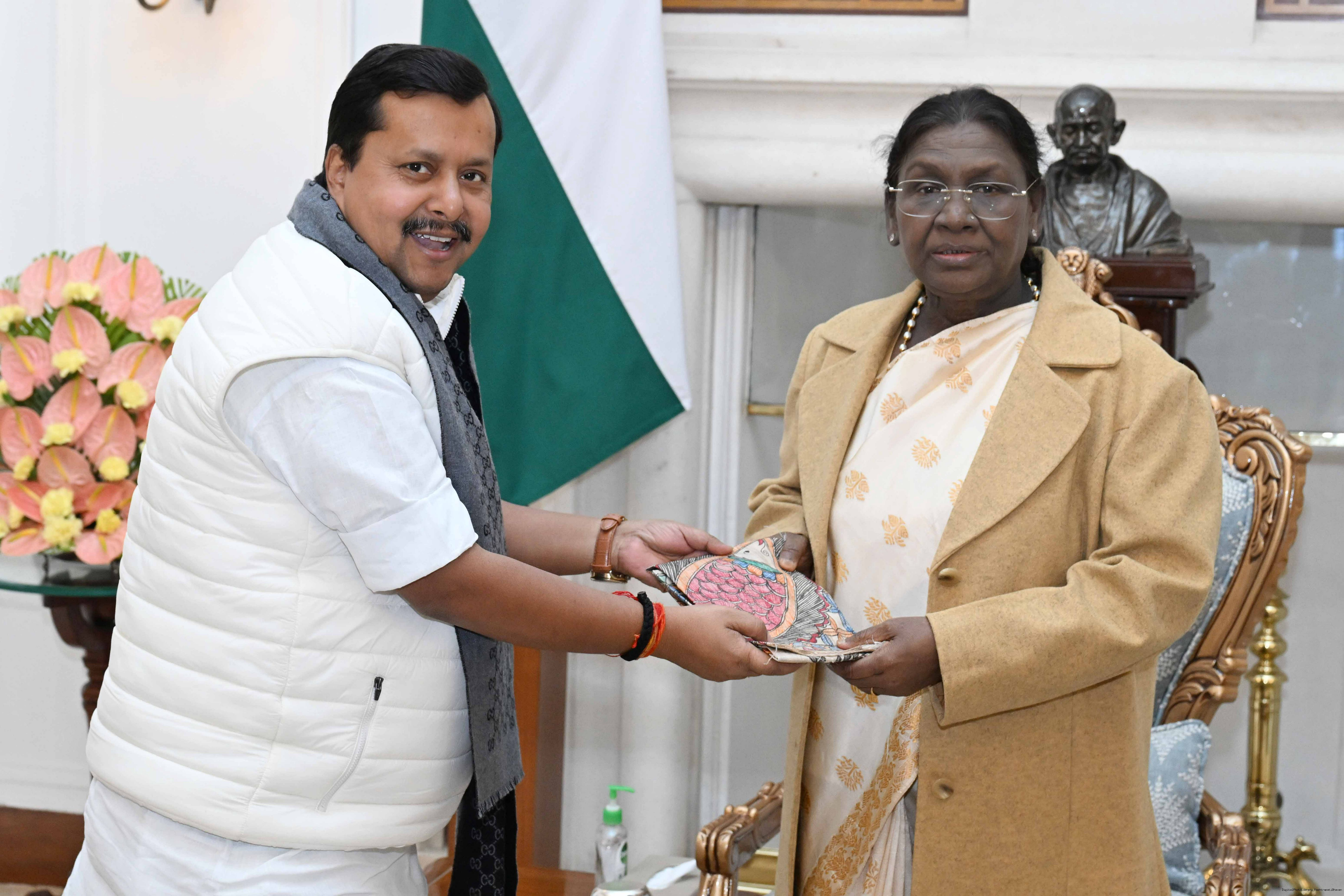
Nabin with President Droupadi Murmu at the Rashtrapati Bhavan in 2026

== National President of BJP ==
In December 2025, the BJP parliamentary board appointed Nitin Nabin as the National Working President of the Bharatiya Janata Party. He succeeded J. P. Nadda as national president in January 2026.

On September 25, 2026, Nitin said that the BJP's strength was based on the trust it had gained through its work and service to the public. responding to a question about the party's repeated electoral victories, he also said he was confident that the BJP would continue to serve the public for the next 25 years and described public service as a central part of the party's approach to governance.

== Political timeline ==
- 1980 – Born on 23 May in Ranchi, Bihar (formerly)
- 1998 – Completed intermediate education
- 2006 – Won by-election from Patna West and became MLA
- 2010 – Re-elected as MLA from Bankipur
- 2015 – Re-elected as MLA from Bankipur
- 2020 – Won fourth consecutive term as MLA
- 2021–2022 – Minister of Road Construction, Bihar
- 2024–2025 – Minister of Urban Development & Housing and Law & Justice, Bihar
- 2025 – Re-elected as MLA from Bankipur
- December 2025 – Appointed National Working President of BJP
- January 2026 – Appointed National President of BJP
- March 2026 - Elected as Rajya Sabha member from Bihar.
