= 16th Bihar Assembly =

Bihar Legislative Assembly

Sixteenth Legislative Assembly of Bihar

Type
- Type: Bicameral
- Houses: Bihar Legislative Assembly

History
- Preceded by: 15th Bihar Assembly
- Succeeded by: 17th Bihar Assembly

Leadership
- Speaker: Vijay Kumar Chaudhary, JD(U) (2015 To 2020)
- Chief Minister: Nitish Kumar (2015 - 2020), JD(U)
- Deputy Chief Minister: Tejashwi Yadav (2015–2017), RJD; Sushil Kumar Modi (2017–2020), BJP
- Leader of the Opposition: Prem Kumar (2015–2017), BJP; Tejashwi Yadav (2017–2020), RJD

Structure
- Seats: 243
- Political groups: Government (131) NDA (131): JD(U) (71); BJP (53); LJP (2); HAM (1); IND (4); Opposition (112) MGB-UPA (111): RJD (80); INC (27); CPI(ML) (3); IND (1); Others (1): AIMIM (1); Vacant (0): Vacant (0)
- Length of term: 2015–2020

Elections
- Voting system: first-past-the-post
- Last election: 2015
- Next election: 2020

The Sixteenth Legislative Assembly of Bihar (Sixteenth Vidhan Sabha of Bihar) was constituted on 20 November 2015 as a result of Bihar Legislative Assembly election, 2015 held between 12 October to 5 November 2015. The Legislative Assembly has total of 243 MLAs.
