= Jan Suraaj Party =

- Abbreviation: JSP
- President: Uday Singh (National); Manoj Bharti (Bihar)
- Spokesperson: Pavan Varma and Yaduvansh Giri
- Founder: Prashant Kishor
- Founded: 2 October 2024; 2 years ago (as Jan Suraaj Party) 2 May 2022; 4 years ago (as Jan Suraaj Abhiyan)
- Headquarters: Suite No. 2, 1st Floor, Dakshineshwar Building, 10 Hailey Road, New Delhi-110001
- Ideology: Gandhism; Social liberalism
- Political position: Centre to centre-left
- Colours: Yellow
- Slogan: Sahī lōga, sahī sōca aura sāmūhika prayāsa (transl. Right people, right thinking, and collective effort)
- ECI status: RUPP
- Seats in Rajya Sabha: 0 / 245
- Seats in Lok Sabha: 0 / 543
- Seats in Bihar Legislative Council: 1 / 75
- Seats in Bihar Legislative Assembly: 1 / 243

Election symbol
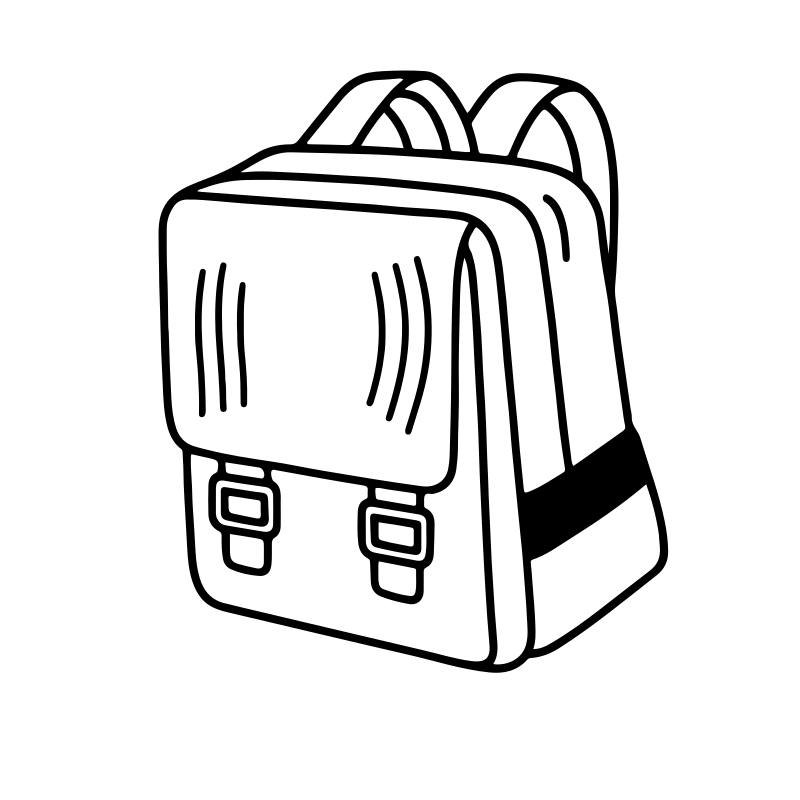
- School bag

Website
- www.jansuraaj.org

The Jan Suraaj Party (lit. 'People's Good Governance Party'; abbr. JSP) is an Indian political party founded by Prashant Kishor on 2 October 2024, coinciding with Gandhi Jayanti. Rooted in Gandhian principles and social liberalism, the party positions itself at the centre to centre-left of the political spectrum, and seeks to function in the spirit of Mahatma Gandhi’s leadership acted as a broad-based people’s movement.

The party emerged from the Jan Suraaj Abhiyan, a grassroots movement initiated by Kishor to engage with the people of Bihar and develop a governance roadmap. This was followed by a statewide padyatra that began on 2 October 2022 from the Gandhi Ashram in Champaran, the site of Mahatma Gandhi’s 1917 satyagraha, culminating in a launch event in Patna, that drew a crowd of over 200,000 people, marking the formal transition of Kishor’s Jan Suraaj Abhiyan into a political organisation.

== History ==
=== Formation and early initiatives ===
After his successful election campaigns in West Bengal and Tamil Nadu in May 2021, Kishor announced his retirement as an election strategist on live television, stating, "I do not want to continue what I am doing. I have done enough. Time for me to take a break and do something else in life. I want to quit this space."

About a year later, on 2 May 2022, Prashant Kishor hinted at the formation of a political outfit through a tweet stating, "It’s time to go to the Real Masters, The People," and advocating for "Jan Suraaj—People’s Good Governance."

On 5 May 2022, he formally launched the Jan Suraaj Abhiyan in a press conference in Patna, declaring his intention to undertake a 3,500+ km padyatra across Bihar. Between May and October 2022, Kishor travelled extensively across the state, meeting people from diverse backgrounds to understand their concerns and formulate a long-term governance strategy.

=== 2025 Bihar Legislative Assembly Election ===
Jan Suraaj party contested on 238 seats in the 2025 Bihar Legislative Assembly elections. This marked the party's first major electoral contest since it was formed as a political party. Throughout the campaign, the party focused on issues which included education, healthcare, employment and migration. Jan Suraaj campaigned without forming an alliance with other parties and had initially announced to contest all 243 constituencies in Bihar. Emphasis was placed on reducing youth migration from Bihar by promoting local employment and Industry. The party highlighted that it's candidate selection was based on professional qualifications and the lack of criminal backgrounds or political dynasties.

The first list of 51 candidates was released on 9 October which included teachers, former bureaucrats, and also a transgender candidate. The party's election symbol was a school bag, highlighting it's focus on education and youth related issues.

In October, Prashant Kishor announced that he himself would not be contesting in the Bihar elections. PK had earlier indicated he was looking at Raghopur as a possible seat for himself. Instead of Kishor, the party fielded Chanchal Kumar against Tejashwi Yadav.

It failed to win a single seat, registering a vote share percentage of 3.44%. The party registered fewer votes than None of the above in 68 constituencies. Jan Suraaj's candidates finished in second place in only one seat, while the party did not finish among the top two in the remaining constituencies.

=== Bankipur by-election ===
In August 2026, Jan Suraaj Party founder Prashant Kishor contested the Bankipur Assembly by-election and defeated the Bharatiya Janata Party (BJP) candidate, securing his first electoral victory. This marked the Jan Suraaj Party's first ever seat in the Bihar Legislative Assembly, a significant milestone for the party after it failed to win any seats in the 2025 Bihar Legislative Assembly election.

== Padyatra and party formation ==
The Jan Suraaj Padyatra commenced on 2 October 2022 from Gandhi Ashram, Bhitiharwa, West Champaran. Over the next two years, Kishor and his team visited 5,000+ villages, engaging with local communities to identify key issues and draft a 10-year development roadmap. The campaign had three stated goals:

1. Identifying capable individuals at the grassroots level with the help of society and offering them a democratic platform.
2. Understanding local problems and opportunities to draft priorities for towns and panchayats and create a blueprint for their development.
3. Preparing a vision document for the next 15 years, incorporating suggestions from experts and the community on ten key areas: education, health, employment, economic development, agriculture, industry, and social justice.

During this period, several initiatives were launched, including PK Youth Clubs, aimed at training young individuals to enter politics through the Panchayati Raj system.

=== Party formation ===
On 2 October 2024, Kishor officially announced the formation of the Jan Suraaj Party, claiming a membership base of 1 crore individuals. Retired IFS officer Manoj Bharti was appointed as the first Bihar State President.

On 19 May 2025, the 150-member state core committee unanimously elected Uday Singh, a former two-term Lok Sabha MP from Purnia, as the Party's 1st National President.

=== Office holders ===
No.	Portrait	Name	Term in office		
No.	Portrait	Name	Assumed office	Left office	Time in office
1		Prashant Kishor; Founder	2 October 2024	Incumbent	2 years, 42 days
2		Manoj Bharti; Bihar State President	2 October 2024	Incumbent	2 years, 42 days
3		Uday Singh; National President	19 May 2025	Incumbent	1 year, 178 days
4		Pavan Varma; National Chief Spokesperson	23 January 2025	Incumbent	1 year, 294 days

== Electoral performance ==
JSP tasted electoral success for the first time in the Bihar legislative council bypolls (April 2023), when Jan Suraaj-backed Afaq Ahmad was elected as a Member of Legislative Council from Saran district (Teachers Constituency).

=== Bihar by-elections (November 2024) ===
The Jan Suraaj Party made its electoral debut in the Bihar by-elections held on 13 November 2024, contesting four assembly constituencies: Belaganj, Imamganj (SC), Ramgarh, and Tarari. According to the Election Commission of India, the party's performance was as follows:

Jan Suraaj Party – Bihar By-elections November 2024
Constituency	Candidate	Votes Polled	Vote Share	Position
Belaganj	Mohammad Amjad	17,285	10.66%	3rd
Imamganj (SC)	Jitendra Paswan	37,103	22.46%	3rd
Ramgarh	Sushil Kumar Singh	6,513	6.30%	4th
Tarari	Kiran Singh	5,592	3.48%	3rd

=== Bihar Assembly Elections ===
Vidhan Sabha Term	Assembly Elections	Seats Contested	Seats Won	% of votes	% of votes in seats contested	Party Votes	Ref.
18th Vidhan Sabha	2025	238	0 / 243	3.34	3.41	1,677,583	

== See also ==
- 2025 Bihar Legislative Assembly election
