= Murarchak in paliganj =

Murarchak
- Village
- Location in Bihar, India Murarchak (India)
- Coordinates: 25.296863°N 84.852028°E
- Country: India
- State: Bihar
- District: Patna

Population (20014)
  - Total: 1,200

Languages
  - Official: Magahi, Hindi
- Time zone: UTC+5:30 (IST)
- PIN: 801110
- Telephone code: 06135
- ISO 3166 code: IN-BR
- Vehicle registration: BR-01
- Website: patna.nic.in

Murarchak is a village which comes under Chandos Gram Panchayat in Patna district in the Indian state of Bihar. It comes under Sigori Police Station and Paliganj Vidhan Sabha constituency and Pataliputra lok sabha constituency

== Transport ==
- Murarchak is on SH 69. The State capital, Patna is 58 km to the north.
- 14 km far from National Highway 33
- 7 km far from SH-02

== Education ==
- Middle School, Murarchak: This is located at entrance of this village, provides up to 8th Standard education by Government of Bihar.
- Vishwnath High School, Chandos: This is located on the Paliganj - Chandos SH 69 Road. A 12th Standard Higher Secondary School under Bihar School Examination Board provides higher education in this area.

== Economy ==
- Agriculture is major source of economy. Paddy, Wheat, Pulse & Vegetables are the major agricultural production. Main sources of irrigation are monsoon and Canal which originate from Sone River.
- 4.5 km far from Punpun River to Murarchak
- 7.5 km far from Sigori to Murarchak
- 40 km Far from Bihta Railway Station
- 1 km far from Bharat Gas Agency SH-69
- Allahabad Bank Chandos

== Election ==
- Chandhos Panchayat consist 17 councillor and highest in Paliganj block.
- Arun Kumar Yadav was the longest served as a Mukhiya from this Gram Panchayat until 2006 as unreserved.
- Ashok Kumar Yadav was previous Mukhiya From Chandhos Gram Panchayat and he belongs to Murarchak village ( 2016 to 2021 )
- Arun Kumar Yadav is currently elected Mukhiya as Chandhos Gram Panchayat

== Notable people ==
- Dinanath Singh Yadav
- Jai Vardhan Yadav
- Ram Lakhan Singh Yadav
- Sandeep Yadav
