= Bharatpura =

Bharatpura State
- Village
- Location in Bihar, India
- Coordinates: 25°19′37″N 84°48′2″E
- Country: India
- State: Bihar
- District: Patna
- UA: Patna
- Established: 1840
- Elevation: 56 m (184 ft)

Official
  - Languages: Magahi, Hindi, English, Bhojpuri
- Time zone: UTC+5:30 (IST)
- PIN: 801102
- Telephone code: 06135
- Vehicle registration: BR-01
- Website: www.Bharatpura.org www.Bharatpuravillage.com

Bharatpura village in the Paliganj sub-division is a sleepy hamlet about 45 km from Patna. It houses G N Public Library that possesses more than 5,000 rare manuscripts in Sanskrit, Arabic and Persian. Bharatpura is named after its ruler Raja Bharat Singh who was the founder of Bharatpura Gadh. Some of them also migrated to nearby places villages. In the years to come they ruled the Lalganj Sehra Estate during the Mughal period and later become the Zamindars in the British period. Post independence in 1947 the Jagir and Zamindari was seized by the government and large part of the family got settled in Patna and later known as Dhari Family.

Dozens of coins, including the gold-mix coins belonging to the Mughal period were recently discovered here. They, in effect, prove beyond doubt that the whole region had a vibrant medieval culture.

In the last six years, 1,314 such coins have been recovered from this site alone. This region needs a thorough exploration to ascertain the archaeological importance of this site, feel experts. Secretary of the Gopal Narain Public Library, Dhrupad N Singh said that on 17 July, when some labourers were digging the field located adjacent to the boundary wall of the library on the southern corner, they suddenly found a copper pot containing 40 coins of the medieval period. While the copper coins belong to the slave and tughlaq dynasties, the gold-mix coins belong to periods of Babur and Akbar. Sensing the historical significance of these coins, singh gave them to director of the K. P. Jayaswal Research Institute (kpjri) Bijay Kumar Chaudhary for examining them so as to ascertain their importance. following a preliminary examination, chaudhary said that the coins were of great archaeological importance. "some of them are rare ones," he added.

The surroundings of this library are dotted with mounds of archaeological importance. This library is also located on one of them. Away back in 1995, the then director, state archaeology, Prakash Charan Prasad had discovered at least 100 punch-marked coins on the library premises. Again, in 1996, hundreds of copper and silver coins were discovered. The former assistant director of state archives, S A Kazmi had examined these coins, which belonged to the Sher Shah and Aurangzeb periods. At least 200 coins were discovered from this site about a year-and-a-half ago. The then district magistrate of Patna had got them examined by some experts in order to ascertain their date and importance.

To preserve the rich cultural heritage of Bharatpura village, the directorate had put a complete ban on digging in and around the Bharatpura library campus away back in 1995. District and police officials had also been informed about it, but no follow-up action has been taken so far. Singh pointed out that several rare coins have been missing. several complaints have been made by the villagers regarding the theft of coins. Unless the centre takes over this library, the condition of this library is unlikely to improve.

== Distances from cities ==
- Patna 47.4 km
- Danapur 42.8 km
- Bihta 24.7 km
- Bikram 12 km
- Dulhin Bazar 4.5 km
- Ullar 2.4 km
- Paliganj 7.2 km
- Masaurhi 18.8 km
- Jehanabad 33 km
- Arrah 48 km
- Gaya 76 km
- New Delhi 1,028 km
- Kolkata 557 km

== Surrounding villages ==
- Dulhin Bazar
- Ullar
- Lalganj Sehra
- Pansari
- Sarkuna
- Pansuhi
- Masaurhi
- Bharbhesar
- Balipakar
- Dharhara
- Paliganj
- Chandhos

== Temple and school of Bharatpura village ==
- Nayak Prasad Singh Bharatpura Village Resident Wikipedia
- Bharatpura Barki Pul
- Bharatpura Post Office
- Bal Partiyogita Niketan School (Bharatpura Patna)
- Devi Sthan temple Bharatpura
- Bharatpura Sarkari School
- Gopal Narayan Library
- Bharatpura Old Shiv Temple
- Banshidhari High School Bharatpura

=== Gallery ===
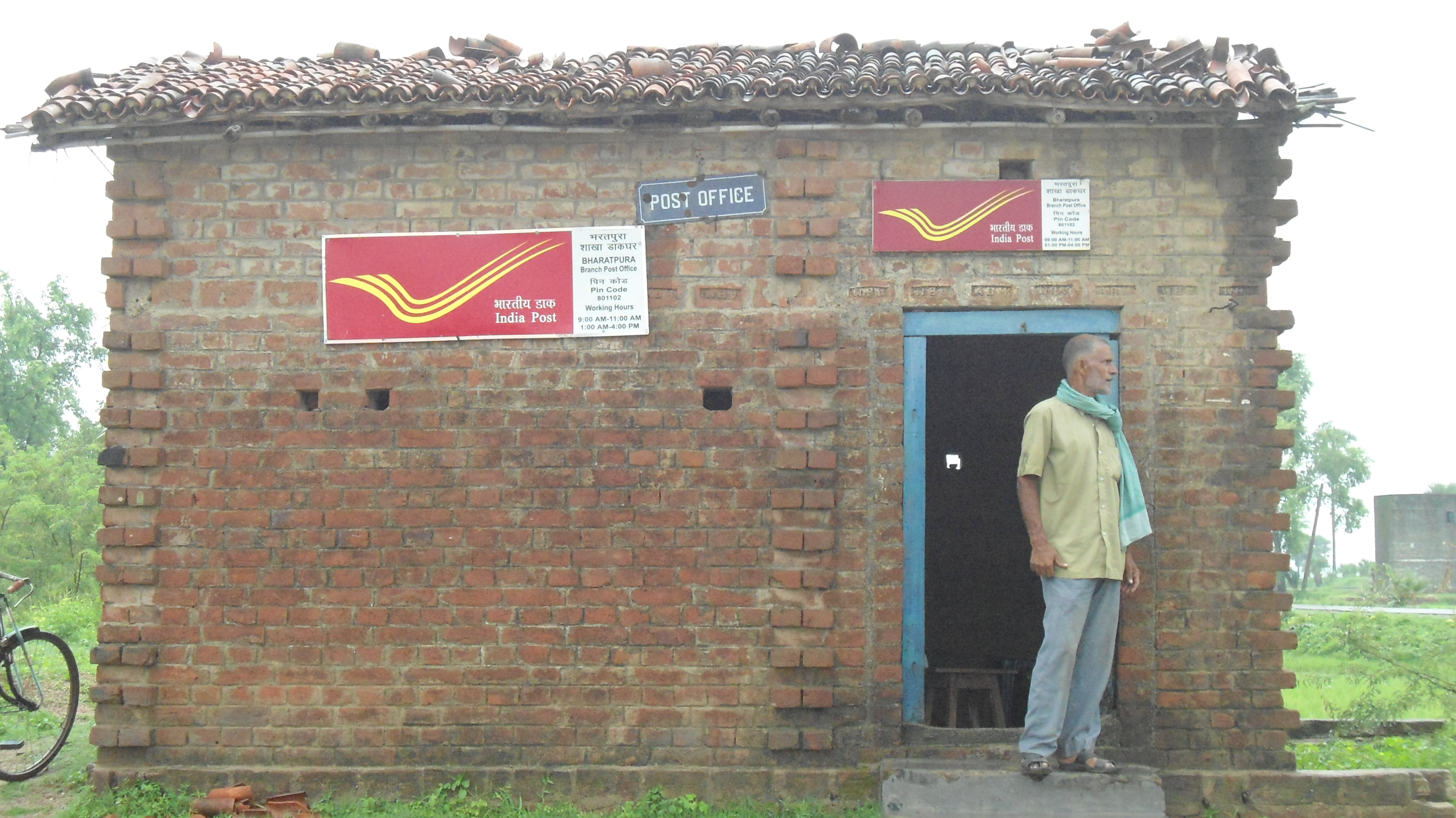
Bharatpura Post Office .
