= Phulwari Sharif =

Indian town in Patna district, Bihar

- Urban
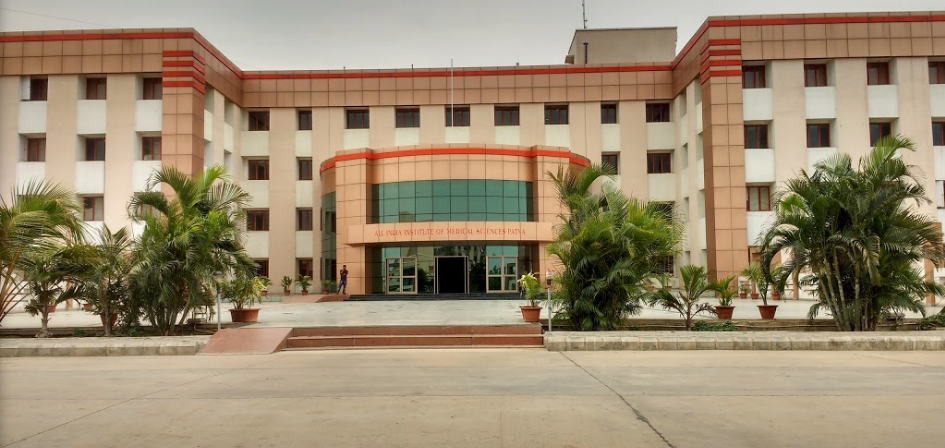
- AIIMS Patna in Phulwari Sharif

- Location in Bihar, India
- Coordinates: 25.578°N 85.079°E
- Country: India
- State: Bihar
- District: Patna district
- UA: Patna

Government
  - Type: Municipal Corporation
  - Body: Phulwari Sharif Nagar Parishad
  - Member of Parliament (MP): Dr. Misa Bharti (RJD)
  - Member of Legislative Assembly: Shyam Rajak

Area
  - Total: 6.48 km^{2} (2.50 sq mi)

Population (2011)
  - Total: 81,740
  - Density: 12,600/km^{2} (32,700/sq mi)
- Demonym

Language
  - Official: Hindi
  - Additional official: Urdu
  - Other: Magadhi
- Time zone: UTC+5:30 (IST)
- Postal code: 801505
- Vehicle registration: BR-01
- Website: patna.nic.in

Phulwari or Phulwari Sharif is a town and Block in Patna district in the Indian state of Bihar. It is included in the Patna Metropolitan Region and is one of the fastest growing area of urban Patna. The civilisation of the city dates back to the days of inception of the Sufi culture in India. Phulwari Sharif had been frequented by most Sufi saints of that period and is famous for its islamic spiritual dargah and old mosques which includes Khanqah Mujibia, Shahi Sangi Masjid, Imarat e sharia.

The All India Institute of Medical Sciences Patna (AIIMS Patna) is located in Phulwari Sharif. Urbanisation has taken over Phulwari Sharif and now it is the most populated area of Patna. Phulwari Sharif is one of the Muslim-majority areas within Patna.

== Geography ==
Phulwari Sharif is located at 25°34′39″N 85°04′46″E

== Demographics ==
Religions in Phulwari Sharif
Religion	Percent
Muslims	56.49%
Hindus	42.96%
Others	0.56%

As of the 2011 Indian census, Phulwari Sharif had a total population of 81,740, of which 42,840 were males and 38,900 were females. Population within the age group of 0 to 6 years was 12,186. The total number of literates in Phulwari Sharif was 55,265, which constituted 67.6% of the population with male literacy of 71.6% and female literacy of 63.2%. The effective literacy rate of 7+ population of Phulwari Sharif was 79.5%, of which male literacy rate was 83.8% and female literacy rate was 74.6%. The Scheduled Castes and Scheduled Tribes population was 6,561 and 141 respectively. Phulwari Sharif had 13,404 households in 2011.

As of the 2001 Indian census, Phulwari Sharif had a population of 53,166. Males constitute 53% of the population and females 47%. In Phulwari Sharif, 8,153 (15.3%) of the population was in the age range of 0 to 6 years. The total number of literates in Phulwari Sharif was 33,583, which gives a crude literacy rate of 63.2%. The effective literacy rate of people 7 years and above was 74.6%.

== Transport ==
Phulwari Sharif is well connected to other cities of India through rail-road network.

=== Road ===
Phulwari Sharif is located on NH 139 on the AIIMS Road in Patna. Parivahan Parisar is located behind phulwarisharif jail. All the city (Patna) and intercity buses run by the Bihar State Road Transport Corporation start from this 24 acres Parivahan Parisar. This transport complex also have offices of Bihar State Road Transport Corporation Limited and district transport office. This transport complex was inaugurated by Chief Minister Nitish Kumar in May 2023.

=== Rail ===
Phulwari Sharif railway station connects the city to different part of the country through many passenger and express trains.

=== Airways ===
Lok Nayak Jay Prakash Narayan Airport is nearby Phulwari Sharif which connects Patna to all other part of country.

== Administration ==
There are 23 Blocks in Patna district, each headed by a BDO. Patna Sadar block, Sampatchak block and Phulwari Sharif block comes under Patna Sadar Sub-division. A subdivision is headed by a SDM.

Phulwari has turned into a prominent city and a notified area of the Patna. Under the plan of Greater Patna it will also come under Patna Municipal Corporation.

== Politics ==
Gopal Ravidas is the MLA of Phulwari Assembly constituency since 2020. He belongs to CPI(ML) Liberation party.

Phulwari falls under the Pataliputra Lok Sabha constituency.

== List of villages ==
The list of villages in Phulwari Block (under Patna Sadar Tehsil) is as follows:

- Bhusaula Danapur
- Chilbilli
- Dhiwara
- Gonpura
- Koriayawan
- Kurkuri
- Kurthoul
- Menpura Anda
- Nohsa
- Persa
- Rampur Faridpur
- Sakraicha
- Shorampur
- Suitha
