= Ram Lakhan Singh Yadav =

Indian politician (1920-2006)

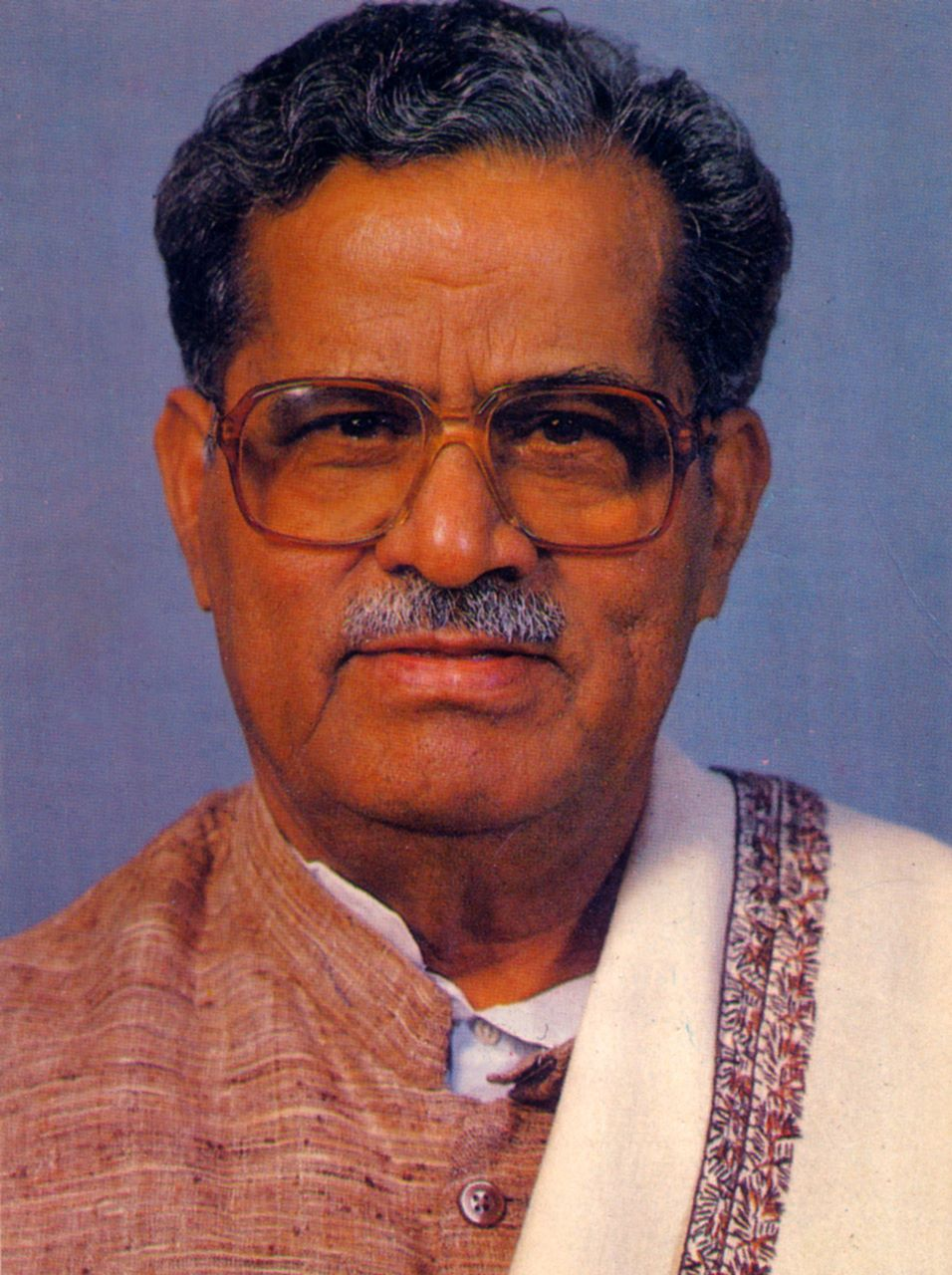

Member of Parliament, Lok Sabha
- In office 1991–1996
- Preceded by: Rameshwar Prasad
- Succeeded by: Chandradeo Prasad Verma
- Constituency: Arrah, Bihar

Member (MLA) of Bihar Legislative Assembly
- In office 1951–1957; 1962–1967; 1980–1995
- Preceded by: Not Exist
- Succeeded by: Chandradeo Prasad Verma
- Constituency: Paliganj
- In office 1977–1980
- Preceded by: Budh Deo Singh
- Succeeded by: Budh Deo Singh
- Constituency: Danapur

Personal details
- Born: 9 March 1920 Amdehari Hari Rampur, Patna District, Bihar, British India
- Died: 16 January 2006 (aged 85) Patna, Bihar
- Party: Janata Dal
- Other political affiliations: Indian National Congress
- Spouse: Reshmi Devi
- Children: Prakash Chandra Yadav

Ram Lakhan Singh Yadav (3 March 1920 – 16 January 2006), known as Sher-e-Bihar, and Ramlakhan Babu, was an Indian freedom fighter, social reformer, educationist, and politician. His political journey, which spanned more than 50 years, began in the post-independence era as a member of the Zilla Parishad in 1947 and reached its peak with his appointment as a Union Minister in the Central Government in 1994. He was elected to the 10th Lok Sabha, the lower house of the Indian Parliament, from the Arrah in 1991 as a member of the Janata Dal. He later joined the Congress under controversial circumstances which helped save Narasimha Rao Government during no confidence vote on 28 July 1993. He also served as the Minister for Chemicals and Fertilizers in the Narasimha Rao Government.

He served as a multi-term Member of the Bihar Legislative Assembly and held multiple key portfolios as a state minister. He first became a Cabinet Minister in 1963 in Krishna Ballabh Sahay ministry. He was accorded the third place in the ministry after Chief Minister Sahay and his deputy Satyendra Narain Singh. A veteran freedom fighter, Shri Yadav was a key figure from Bihar in India's freedom struggle. His younger grandson Jai Vardhan Yadav was elected Member of Legislative Assembly from Paliganj in between 2015 and 2020.

== Early life and independence movement ==
Ram Lakhan Singh Yadav was born on 9 March 1920 in the then Harirampur village of Patna district in the state of Bihar. Shri Yadav was the youngest of four brothers. After completing his Matriculation from Parvati High School, Bikram, Shri Yadav got admitted to BN College, Patna. His active participation in Mahatma Gandhi's Swadeshi Movement, led to him being jailed by the British. As a result, he could not appear for his intermediate examination. It was only after the intervention of the then Chief Minister of Bihar, Dr. Shri Krishan Singh, that Shri Yadav got the opportunity to appear in the Intermediate examination from Patna College. Subsequently, due to his continued involvement in the freedom struggle, the British Government declared him to be a 'dangerous student', a proclamation for student activists who provoked young crowds against the British Raj. This prevented him from pursuing his higher education.

As a student freedom fighter, Shri Yadav operated in close proximity to the student group supporting Subhas Chandra Bose and was appointed as the President for the welcome committee for Subhas Babu's reception in Bikram in 1939 at the age of 19. This was the time when Ramlakhan Babu also came in contact with Swami Sahajanand Saraswati and actively joined his Peasant Movement.

Ramlakhan Babu was an active member of the Congress since 1934 from the young age of 14. When he was 24, he was made the coordinator of the Student and Youth Conference in the Bombay session of the Congress in 1944.

== Political journey and legacy ==
Ram Lakhan Singh Yadav was elected to the Patna Zilla Parishad in 1947. Subsequently, Shri Yadav was a Member of the Bihar Legislative Assembly continuously from 1952 to 1991. In the year 1954, the Bhoodan Movement of Acharya Vinoba Bhave was at its peak in Bihar, and the responsibility of organising it was given to Ramlakhan Babu.

From 2 October 1963 to 5 March 1967, Ramlakhan Babu served as Minister of the Public Works Department, Public Health Engineering Department, and Home Guards in the cabinet of Krishna Ballabh Sahai. In 1998, Yadav wrote about Sahai in the newspaper ‘Aaj’, published in Patna.

In his first ministerial term, Ramlakhan Babu was given the responsibility of expanding the Home Guard in Bihar on the instructions of the then Prime Minister Pandit Jawaharlal Nehru, . The credit goes to Ramlakhan Babu for the construction of barracks and providing medical facilities for the jawans at the Home Guard Center in Bihta. He also played an important role in the implementation of the highly sensitive Lateral Road Project in the border areas and the construction of 24 railway over bridges in Bihar. The construction work of road-cum-railway bridge on Son river in Dehri was also completed under his ministership.

For the construction of the then longest bridge of India, Mahatma Gandhi Setu, necessary funds were arranged by him from the Central Government. Prime Minister Indira Gandhi had approved its foundation stone at the same time. Presently, it is the third-longest river bridge in India.

The proposal to convert the Ara-Sasaram rail line into broad gauge and its survey by the Ministry of Railways, Government of India was also done during his tenure. It was during his tenure that the foundation of Shri Krishna Science Center, Patna and Shri Krishna Memorial Hall, Patna was laid.

In 1971, late Ramlakhan Babu was also a member of the high-level delegation sent by the Government of India to countries like Russia, France, England, Switzerland amongst others. The purpose of the delegation was to present India's stance and seek global support, prior to India's war with Pakistan breaking out. After the 1978 elections, Ramlakhan Babu was made the leader of the opposition in the State Assembly.

In 1980, Mr. Yadav was elected from both Bakhtiyarpur and Paliganj constituencies in the State Assembly elections. He was also appointed as the General Secretary of the Bihar State Citizen Council. In 1985, after once again being elected to the Bihar Legislative Assembly from Paliganj, Shri Yadav served as the Cabinet Minister for Land Revenue, Land Reforms, as well as Rehabilitation and Relief. He was the chairman, Nivedan Samiti, Bihar Legislative Assembly from 1986 to 1989.

Shri Yadav was elected as a Member of the Tenth Lok Sabha from 1991 to 1996, representing Arrah Parliamentary Constituency of Bihar. From 1994 to 1996, he was made the Minister of Chemicals and Fertilizers in the Government of India. Ramlakhan Babu was also the President of Bihar State Freedom Fighters Organization and All India Yadav Mahasabha for years. Even at the last stage of his life, Shri Yadav conducted a day-long sit-in and a speech at the Income Tax Chauraha, Patna under the banner of the All India Yadav Mahasabha to create an Ahir regiment in the Indian Army.

During the 1990s, Ram Lakhan Singh Yadav was the undisputed leader of Yadavs in Bihar. He is until date regarded as one of the tallest Yadav leaders of all times in Bihar and an icon.

== Contributions as a philanthropist and educationist ==
Ramlakhan Babu used to consider education as a celebration of awakening and consciousness. He firmly believed that countering exploitation and tyranny is possible only through education. This is the reason why he took a keen interest in establishing educational institutions in Bihar and Jharkhand. He made the establishment of these institutions possible not at private level but with public cooperation.

=== Attributed state-run institutions and monuments ===
- RLSY College, Paliganj
- RLSY College Anisabad, Patna
- RLSY College Aurangabad, Bihar
- RLSY College, Bakhtiyarpur, Patna, Bihar
- Ram Lakhan Singh Yadav College, Ranchi, Jharkhand
- RLSY College, Nalanda – Bihar Sharif, Bihar
- Ram Lakhan Singh Yadav Inter College, Koderma
- Ram Lakhan Singh Yadav College (RLSY), Bettiah
- Ram Lakhan Singh Yadav College - Kharkhura, Gaya
- RLSY College, Nawada
- RLSY College, Jehanabad

An agriculturist by profession, Shri Yadav was an active social worker. He served as the chairman, Bihar Art Theatre from 1981 to 1985 and as the chairman and Secretary of various cultural organisations in Patna. He was the founder of more than 100 educational institutions and cultural centres in Bihar. He contributed to organising students, labour unions, backward classes, freedom fighters and Kisan Sabha. In an interview to India Today, he is quoted to have said, "For me the farmer comes first. And I am willing to sacrifice anything for him. For the farmer, whatever I have to do, I will do."

== Birth anniversary celebration ==
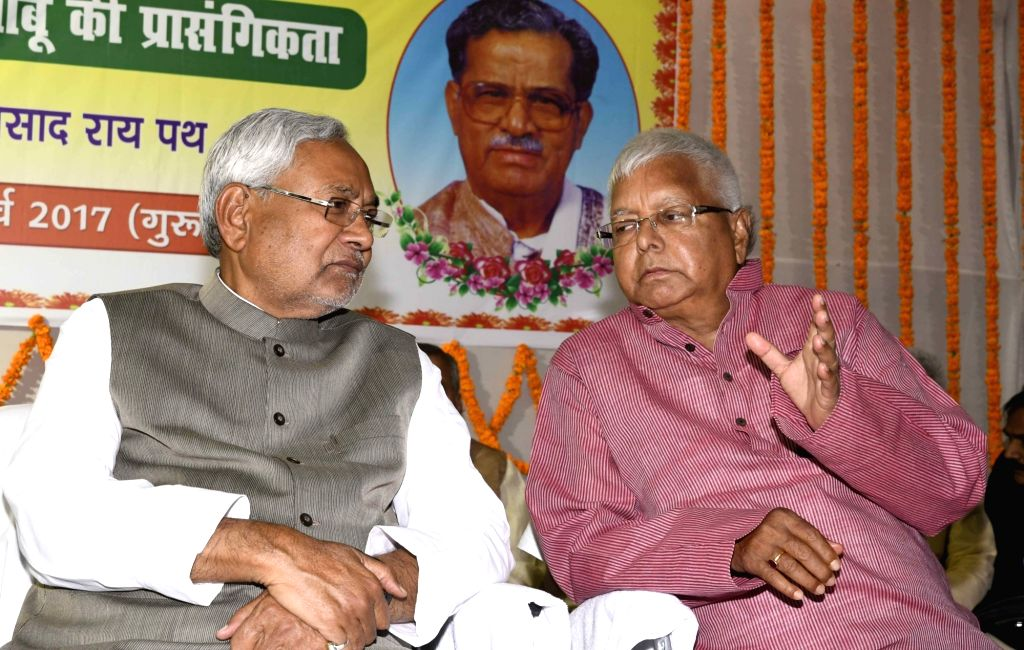
Bihar Chief Minister Nitish Kumar and Former Chief Minister Lalu Prasad Yadav attending Ram Lakhan Singh Yadav memorial function at Sri Krishna Chetna Parishad, Patna

Annually, Shri Yadav's memorial ceremonies are held across Bihar in different institutions established by him, key amongst which is the Shri Krishna Chetna Parishad, Patna. Here, dignitaries have included present and former Chief Ministers of Bihar, politicians, educationists, social thinkers and philanthropists over the course of the years. They gather together to celebrate his legacy and offer homage to his statue installed in the premises.

=== Memorial ceremony and birth anniversary celebration in 2023 ===
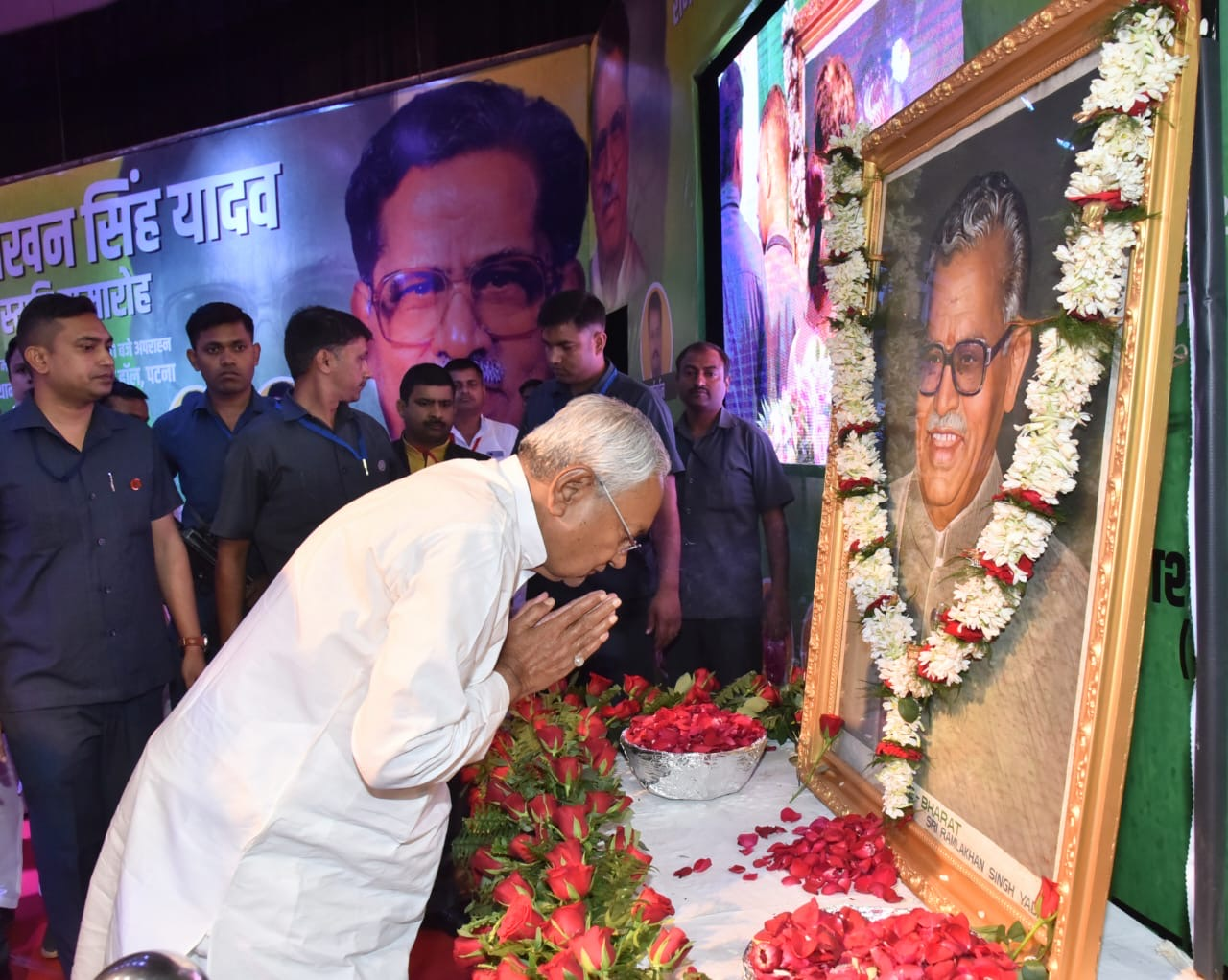
Chief Minister of Bihar Nitish Kumar offering prayers to Late Shri Ram Lakhan Singh Yadav at Krishna Memorial Hall, Patna

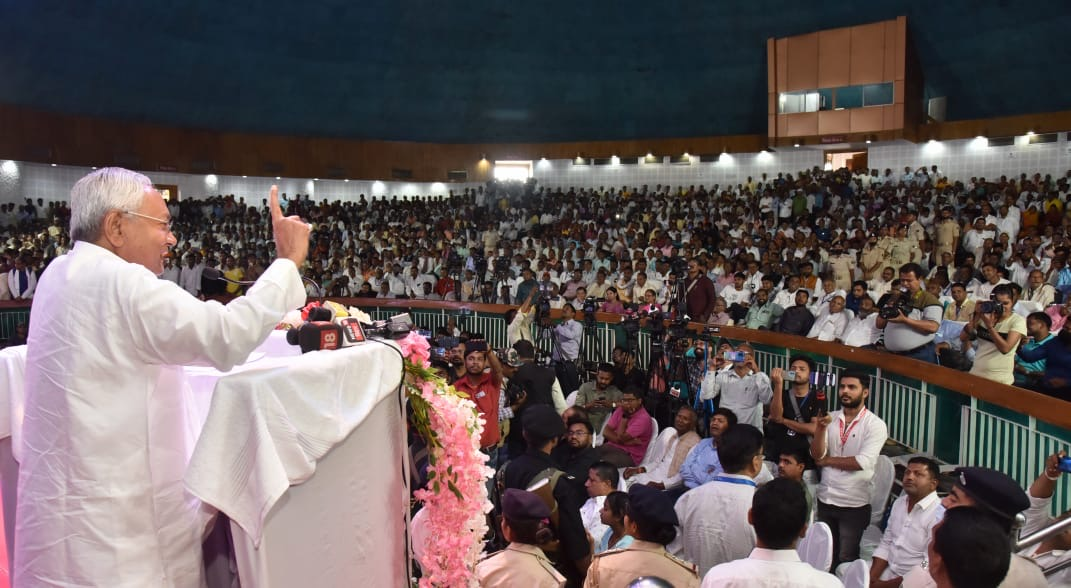
Chief Minister of Bihar Nitish Kumar addressing the crowd on the Memorial Celebration of Sher-e-Bihar Shri Ram Lakhan Singh Yadav at Krishna Memorial Hall, Patna to commemorate his 103rd birth anniversary

A memorial ceremony to commemorate 103rd Birth Anniversary of Shri Yadav was held at Shri Krishna Memorial Hall in Patna which was inaugurated by Chief Minister Nitish Kumar on 26 March 2023. In his address, he said "No leader of Bihar has built colleges on such a large scale. When we were MLAs, we had seen his ministerial tenure from close quarters. He believed in us a lot. He inspired people from all sections of the society to read. He wanted education to reach all the people."

On this occasion, the Chief Minister released the book "Ramlakhan Singh Yadav – Personality and Works" written by Dr. Raghuvar Prasad. Dr Prasad has also done his PhD on Shri Yadav as a subject.

Chief Minister Nitish Kumar also announced that going forward, Shri Yadav's birth anniversary will be celebrated as a state ceremony and his statue will be installed in Patna. He launched the campaign "Chalo Chalen Kalam Ki Aur". During the program, a short film based on the personality and work of late Ram Lakhan Singh Yadav was screened.
