= Samya Garh, Bihar =

Samya Garh is a village in the Ghoswari block of the Patna district in Bihar, located 12 kilometres south-west of Mokama.

The main occupation is agriculture and the main crops are lentils and peanuts. Laxmi Narayan Mandir is the centre of Hindu devotion. Shiv, Kali, and Sitaram are worshipped here.

The total population of the Samya Garh village as per the 2001 Census of India is 3929. The literacy rate is 43.61%. The female literacy rate is 27.46%. The male literacy rate is 54.93%.
