= Prakash Chandra Yadav =

Indian politician

Member of Parliament, Lok Sabha
- In office 1984-1989
- Preceded by: Dharam Bir Sinha
- Succeeded by: Nitish Kumar
- Constituency: Barh, Bihar

Personal details
- Born: Amdehari Hari Rampur, Patna District, Bihar
- Party: Rashtriya Janata Dal
- Other political affiliations: Indian National Congress
- Children: Jai Vardhan Yadav Harsh Vardhan Yadav and Shubh Lakshmi

Prakash Chandra Yadav was an Indian politician and he was elected to the Lok Sabha, lower house of the Parliament of India from the Barh, Bihar in 1984-1989. Yadav's father Ram Lakhan Singh Yadav was also elected to the Lok Sabha, lower house of the Parliament of India from the Arrah, Bihar in 1991-1996.
