= Ular =

Ular could refer to:

- Ular, Indonesia, an island in the Sunda Strait
- Ular, Russia, part of the Uvs Nuur Basin World Heritage Site
- an alternative transliteration of Volar, Afghanistan
- Ülar, an Estonian given name
