= Ritlal Yadav =

Indian politician

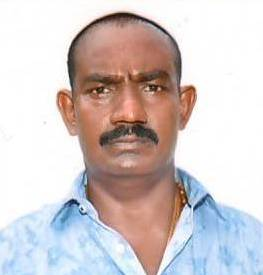

Member of Bihar Legislative Assembly
- In office 2020–2025
- Preceded by: Asha Devi Sinha
- Succeeded by: Ram Kripal Yadav
- Constituency: Danapur

Member of Bihar Legislative Council
- In office 2015–2020
- Constituency: Patna Local Authorities

Personal details
- Born: 16 January 1972 (age 54) Danapur, Bihar, India
- Party: Rashtriya Janata Dal
- Education: Bihar Intermediate Council (I.A)

Ritlal Yadav or Ritlal Rai (born 16 January 1972) is an Indian gangster and leader of RJD who won the Bihar Legislative Council election in July 2015 as an independent candidate. Ritlal was in jail in connection with multiple criminal cases, including murder charges. Ritlal is accused in over 33 cases. He was a former Member of Legislative Council (MLC), the post, to which he was elected in 2016. He was incarcerated in Beur Jail until August 2020. However he was then released from the jail on bail. Ritlal Yadav defeated BJP's Asha Devi Sinha in the 2020 Bihar Assembly elections.

== Life and career ==
Ritlal Yadav came to limelight in 2003 when Lalu Prasad Yadav was undertaking his Tel Pilawan lathi ghumawan Yatra to garner the support of Biharis for his party. According to media reports, Ritlal is an accused in the assassination of Bhartiya Janata Party leader Satyanarayan Sinha at Jamaluddin chowk near Khagaul. He is also named in several other serious cases like extortion and murder, which includes accusation in assassination of his rival Chunnu Singh at Chhath ghat in Neura and assassination of two railway contractors in a running train near Bakhtiyarpur.

He came into contact with Lalu Prasad, when Ram Kripal Yadav defected from Rashtriya Janata Dal. Yadav was denied party ticket from Pataliputra Lok Sabha constituency, due to the party's decision to nominate Misa Bharti from there. Ritlal supported Misa Bharti in the election going against Ram Kripal Yadav, but she lost. He later joined Rashtriya Janata Dal and Lalu Prasad made him the General Secretary of the party. In 2010, Ritlal surrendered in the court in connection with numerous charges lodged against him and contested the Bihar Assembly Elections of 2010 from the prison. He lost the election of 2010. In 2015 Janata Dal (United), the arch rival of Rashtriya Janata Dal allied with it to take on Bharatiya Janata Party led alliance in Bihar Legislative Assembly Elections of 2015. Lalu could not provide ticket to Yadav from Danapur, hence he violated the party discipline by filing nomination as independent candidate from the same constituency which led to his expulsion from the RJD. He contested the elections to Bihar Legislative Council from within the jail in 2016 and became Member of Legislative Council. In August 2020 he was released from the jail on bail. In 2020 Bihar Assembly Election Rashtriya Janata Dal made Ritlal its candidate from Danapur assembly.

In the 2020 elections to Bihar Assembly, Ritlal faced Asha Devi Sinha, the wife of Satyanarayan Sinha who was allegedly murdered by his men. After the incarceration of Yadav she had been winning Danapur seat for three consecutive terms on the ticket of Bhartiya Janata Party.
