= Pundarakh =

Village in Bihar, India

- Village
- Location within Bihar Location within India
- Coordinates: 25°29′33″N 85°48′18″E
- Country: India
- State: Bihar
- District: Patna
- Block: Pandarak

Government
  - Type: Sarpanch

Area
  - Total: 14.9 km^{2} (5.8 sq mi)
- Elevation: 55 m (180 ft)

Population (2011)
  - Total: 32,627
  - Density: 2,190/km^{2} (5,670/sq mi)

Languages
  - Common: Magahi, Hindi
- Time zone: UTC+5:30 (IST)
- PIN: 803221
- STD code: 06132
- Vehicle registration: BR-01

Pundarakh is a village under the administration of the Indian state Bihar. It is located within Patna district, about 68 kilometres (42 mi) east of the state capital Patna. As of 2011, the village had a population of 32,627.

== Geography ==
Pundarakh is located on the south bank of the Ganges River. The National Highway 31 runs east–west through it. The village covers an area of 1,490 hectares (3,700 acres).

== Demographics ==
According to the census figures in 2011, Pundarakh had 32,627 inhabitants and 5,083 households. The census recorded 17,244 male residents and 15,383 female residents for the village. The working population constituted 31.95% of the total population. The literacy rate was 45.98%, as 9,342 males and 5,661 females of the village were literate.
