= Maner Assembly constituency =

Assembly constituency in Bihar, India

Coordinates: 25°38′51″N 84°52′54″E

Maner
- Constituency No. 187 for the Bihar Legislative Assembly

Constituency details
- Country: India
- Region: East India
- State: Bihar
- District: Patna
- Lok Sabha constituency: 31 Pataliputra
- Established: 1951
- Total electors: 334,256

Member of Legislative Assembly
- 18th Bihar Legislative Assembly
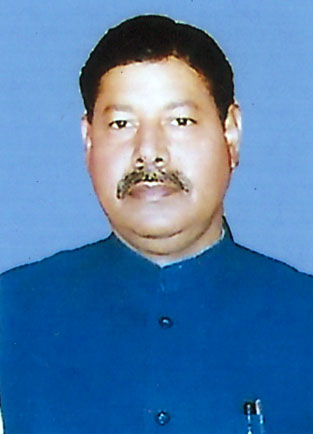
- Incumbent Bhai Virendra Yadav
- Party: RJD
- Alliance: MGB
- Elected year: 2025

Maner is one of 243 constituencies of legislative assembly of Bihar. It comes under Pataliputra Lok Sabha constituency along with other assembly constituencies viz. Danapur, Masaurhi, Phulwari, Paliganj and Bikram.

Most successful parties from Maner Assembly
1. INC (6 times) (33.0%)
2. RJD (5 times) (28.0%)
3. IND (2 times) (11.0%)
4. JD (1 time) (6.00%)
5. CPI (1 time) (6.00%)
6. INC(O) (1 time) (6.00%)
7. JP (1 time) (5.00%)
8. SAP (1 time) (5.00%)

== Area/Wards ==
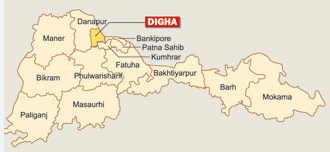
Maner in Patna district

Maner comprises Maner CD block; Gram Panchayats: Anandpur, Kateshar, Sikandarpur, Parev, Daulatpur Simri, Mushepur, Shri Rampur, Bihta, Dayalpur, Daulatpur, Purshottampur Painathi, Bishunpura, Raghopur, Amhara, Kanchanpur Kharagpur, Sadisopur, Painal, Bela, Neora, Makhdoompur & Shri Chandpur of Bihta CD block.

== Members of the Legislative Assembly ==
Year	Name	Party
1952	Rameshwar Prasad Shastri	Indian National Congress
1957	Shribhagwan Singh Yadav	Communist Party of India
1962	Budhdeo Singh	Indian National Congress
1967	Ram Nagina Yadav	Independent politician
1969	Mahabir Gop	Indian National Congress
1972	Ram Nagina Yadav	Indian National Congress
1977	Suryadeo Singh Yadav	Janata Party
1980	Ram Nagina Yadav	Independent politician
1984^	Rajmati Devi Yadav	Indian National Congress
1985	Rajmati Devi Yadav	Indian National Congress
1990	Srikant Nirala Yadav	Indian National Congress
1995	Srikant Nirala Yadav	Janata Dal
2000	Bhai Virendra Rai	Samata Party
2005	Srikant Nirala Yadav	Rashtriya Janata Dal
2005	Srikant Nirala Yadav	Rashtriya Janata Dal
2010	Bhai Virendra Yadav	Rashtriya Janata Dal
2015	Bhai Virendra Yadav	Rashtriya Janata Dal
2020	Bhai Virendra Yadav	Rashtriya Janata Dal
2025	Bhai Virendra Yadav	Rashtriya Janata Dal

== Election results ==
=== 2025 ===
Bihar Legislative Assembly Election, 2025: Maner
Party	Candidate	Votes	%	±%
RJD	Bhai Birendra	110,798	48.99	▲1.55
LJP(RV)	Jitendra Yadav	90,764	40.14	
JSP	Sandip Singh	3,980	1.76	
JJD	Shankar Kumar	3,290	1.45	
Independent	Vikash Kumar Alias Dikesh Singh	2,889	1.28	
Independent	Sannu Devi	2,769	1.22	
NOTA	None of the above	5,041	2.23	▲1.67
Majority		20,034	8.85	▼7.73
Turnout		226,143	67.66	▲6.66
RJD hold				

=== 2020 ===
Bihar Assembly election, 2020: Maner
Party	Candidate	Votes	%	±%
RJD	Bhai Virendra Yadav	94,223	47.44	▼2.61
BJP	Nikhil Anand	61,306	30.86	▼6.47
Independent	Shrikant Nirala	14,615	7.36	
Independent	Vikash Kumar	4,024	2.03	
Independent	Kameshwar Kumar	3,108	1.56	
Independent	Kush Kumar	3,034	1.53	
Independent	Javahar Singh	2,863	1.44	
Independent	Janme Jay Kumar	2,786	1.4	
Independent	Basant Raw Sathe	2,018	1.02	
NOTA	None of the above	1,106	0.56	▼2.3
Majority		32,917	16.58	▲3.86
Turnout		198,628	61.0	▲1.29
RJD hold				

=== 2015 ===
Bihar assembly elections, 2015: Maner
Party	Candidate	Votes	%	±%
RJD	Bhai Virendra	89,773	50.05	
BJP	Srikant Nirala	66,945	37.33	
CPI(ML)L	Gopal Singh	4,332	2.42	
Independent	Chaudhary Brahm Prakash Singh	2,418	1.35	
SP	Amarnath Prasad	2,114	1.18	
BSP	Rajpati Devi	1,809	1.01	
JAP(L)	Lalan Kumar	1,619	0.9	
Independent	Anju Devi	1,606	0.9	
NOTA	None of the above	5,122	2.86	
Majority		22,828	12.72	
Turnout		179,353	59.71	
RJD hold				

=== 2005 ===
Bihar assembly elections, 2010: Maner
Party	Candidate	Votes	%	±%
RJD	Srikant Nirala yadav	34012	43.69	
JD(U)	Sacchidanand rai yadav	30120	36.43	
RJD hold				

== See also ==
- List of Assembly constituencies of Bihar
- Maner
