= Usha Vidyarthi =

Indian politician

Member of Bihar Legislative Assembly
- In office 2010–2015
- Preceded by: Nand Kumar Nanda
- Succeeded by: Jai Vardhan Yadav
- Constituency: Paliganj

Personal details
- Party: Lok Janashakti Party
- Other political affiliations: Bharatiya Janata Party
- Spouse: Umesh Kumar Vidyarthi
- Education: M.A., L.L.B.
- Alma mater: Patna University and Magadh University

Usha Vidyarthi is an Indian politician. She was elected to the Bihar Legislative Assembly from Paliganj constituency in Bihar in the 2015 Bihar Legislative Assembly election as a member of the Bharatiya Janata Party. She joined Lok Janashakti Party ahead of 2020 Bihar Legislative Assembly election.
