= Athmalgola =

Town in Patna district, Bihar, India

AthmalGola
- Town
- Location in Bihar, India
- Coordinates: 25.27°N 85.40°E
- Country: India
- State: Bihar
- Division: Patna
- District: Patna
- Elevation: 47 m (154 ft)

Languages
  - Official: Magahi, Hindi
- Time zone: UTC+5:30 (IST)
- PIN: 803211
- Telephone code: 06132
- Website: patna.nic.in

Athmalgola, a town situated in the district of Patna in Bihar. It is located along the Ganges River, 30 miles (48 km) south-east of Patna, the state capital.

== Demographics ==
As of 2011 India census, Athmalgola block had a population of 90,964, with 48,169 men and 42,795 women. Athmalgola has an average literacy rate of 49.7% .
