= Paliganj =

Indian town in Patna district, Bihar

- City
- Location in Bihar, India
- Coordinates: 25°19′37″N 84°48′2″E
- Country: India
- State: Bihar
- Division: Patna
- District: Patna
- UA: Patna
- Ward: 16 wards
- Established: 1987

Government
  - Type: Nagar Panchayat
  - Body: Paliganj Assembly Constituency
  - Member Of Parliament (MP): Misa Bharti (RJD)
  - Member of the Legislative Assembly: Sandeep Saurav (CPI(ML)L)
- Elevation: 70 m (230 ft)

Languages
  - Spoken: Magadhi, Hindi
- Time zone: UTC+5:30 (IST)
- PIN: 801110
- Telephone code: 06135
- Vehicle registration: BR-01

Paliganj is a city in Patna district, Bihar, India. It is one of the six sub-divisions (Tehsil) of Patna district. At the census of 2011, Paliganj had a population of 254,904; the city is approximately 60 km (37 mi) from Patna.

== Politics ==
Paliganj is part of the Paliganj Assembly constituency under the Pataliputra Lok Sabha constituency. Sandeep Saurav is the current MLA who defeated Jay Vardhan Yadav in 2020 Bihar Assembly Election.

== Notable people ==
- Jai Vardhan Yadav

== Education ==
- Bihar Public School, Paliganj
- Ram Lakhan Singh Yadav College Paliganj
- P.N.K College Achhua Paliganj| Paras nath kushwaha college|
