= Asha Devi Sinha =

Indian politician

Member of Bihar Legislative Assembly
- In office 2005–2020
- Preceded by: Rama Nand Yadav
- Succeeded by: Ritlal Yadav
- Constituency: Danapur

Personal details
- Born: Asha Devi; 1 March 1966 (age 60) Sarari, Danapur Patna
- Party: BJP
- Spouse: Satynarayan Sinha
- Education: Non Matric
- Profession: Politician social worker

Asha Devi Sinha (born 1 March 1966) is an Indian politician from Bihar. She was elected to the Bihar Legislative Assembly representing Bharatiya Janata Party (BJP) from Danapur in February 2005, October 2005, 2010 and 2015. In the 2020 elections to Bihar Assembly, Asha Devi faced Ritlal Yadav, whose men allegedly murdered her husband Satyanarayan Sinha.

== About ==
Sinha is from Danapur, Patna district, Bihar. She married BJP leader Satyanarayan Sinha. Sinha contested the 2002 by-poll from Danapur but lost to Rama Nand Yadav.

== Career ==
Sihna won from Danapur Assembly constituency representing the Bharatiya Janata Party in the February 2005 Bihar Legislative Assembly election. She retained the seat in the October 2005 Bihar Legislative Assembly election and won for a third time in the 2010 Bihar Legislative Assembly election. She won for the fourth time in the 2015 Bihar Legislative Assembly election defeating Raj Kishor Yadav of the RJD by a margin of 5,209 votes but lost the next election to Ritlal Yadav, who was allegedly involved in the murder of her husband Satyanarayan Sinha. After the imprisonment of Ritlal Yadav, Sinha won Danapur seat in four consecutive elections representing Bharatiya Janata Party. But she lost the 2020 election.
