= Vijay Singh Yadav =

Indian politician (1953–2021)

Member of Parliament (Rajya Sabha)
- In office 2000-2006
- Preceded by: Nagmani
- Succeeded by: Jabir Husain
- Constituency: Bihar

Member of Bihar Legislative Assembly
- In office 1995-2000
- Preceded by: Vijendra Ray Yadav
- Succeeded by: Lalu Prasad Yadav
- Constituency: Danapur

Personal details
- Born: 1953 Patna, Bihar
- Died: 16 May 2021 (aged 68) Kankarbagh, Patna, Bihar
- Party: Bharatiya Janata Party
- Other political affiliations: Rashtriya Janata Dal, Indian National Congress
- Spouse: Dhan Kumari Devi
- Children: 4 sons, 4 daughters

Vijay Singh Yadav (1953 – 16 May 2021) was an Indian politician. He was a member of the Rajya Sabha, the upper house of the Parliament of India, representing Bihar as a member of the Rashtriya Janata Dal. He was earlier a member of the Bihar Legislative Assembly from Danapur as a member of the Bharatiya Janata Party.

He died on 16 May 2021 at the age of 68.
