= Sampatchak =

- Town
- Location in Bihar, India
- Coordinates: 25.5407025°N 85.1751534°E
- Country: India
- State: Bihar
- District: Patna

Government
  - Body: Nagar parishad

Area
  - Total: 65.36 km^{2} (25.24 sq mi)
- Elevation: 50 m (160 ft)

Population (2011)
  - Total: 106,866
  - Density: 1,635/km^{2} (4,235/sq mi)

Languages
  - Official: Hindi, Urdu, Magahi
- Time zone: UTC+5:30 (IST)
- Postal code: 800007
- Area code: 0612
- Vehicle registration: BR-01
- Website: patna.nic.in

Sampatchak is a town and one of the 23 blocks of Patna district of Bihar. The block falls under Patna Sadar Sub-division. Sampatakchak was declared a nagar parishad in 2020 along with Bihta.

== Demographics ==
As of the 2011 India census, Sampatakchak had a population of 1,06,866 with males constituting 52.5% of the population and females 47.5%. Sampatakchak has an average literacy rate of 67.48%, which is more than the national average of 59.5%. Male literacy is 76.54%, whereas female literacy is only 57.42%. 17. 72% of the population is under 6 years of age.
