= Ranjan Prasad Yadav =

Indian politician

- Born: 18 April 1945 (age 81); Patna, Bihar, British India
- Education: PhD & MSc.(Geology).
- Alma mater: Science College, Patna University, Patna, Bihar.
- Occupations: Professor, Social Worker, Educationist, Sportsperson & Politician.
- Years active: 1990 – date
- Political party: JD(U), (Janata Dal).
- Spouse: Dr. Suman Yadav.
- Children: 2 (1 son and 1 daughter)
- Parents: Jaggan Bhagat (father); Quwadar Devi (mother)

Ranjan Prasad Yadav was a member of the 15th Lok Sabha of India. Yadav represented the Pataliputra constituency of Bihar and is a member of the Janata Dal (United) political party.

== Education and background ==
Educated at Science College in Patna University, Yadav has accomplished Doctorate after completing MSc in geology. He then worked as a Professor before joining politics.

== Positions held ==
#	From	To	Position	Party
1.	1990	1996	MP (1st term) in Rajya Sabha from Bihar	
2.	1996	2002	MP (2nd term) in Rajya Sabha from Bihar	
3.	2009	2014	MP (1st term) in 15th Lok Sabha from Pataliputra	JD(U)

== See also ==
- List of members of the 15th Lok Sabha of India
