= Srikant Nirala =

Indian politician

Member of Bihar Legislative Assembly
- In office 1990–1995; 1995–2000; 2005 – 2010
- Preceded by: Rajmati Devi
- Succeeded by: Bhai Virendra
- Constituency: Maner
- In office 1990
- Constituency: 210Maner, 192Maner, 187Maner

Personal details
- Born: Srikant Nirala Hulasi Tola (Rampur Diara) Maner, Patna, Bihar
- Party: Bharatiya Janata Party (2024- Present)
- Other political affiliations: Indian National Congress (1990 to 1995); Janta Dal (1995 to 2000); Rashtriya Janata Dal (2000 to 2010); Janata Dal (United) (2010 to 2015); Independent (2020 - 2024); Bharatiya Janata Party (2015 to 2020) (2024-present)
- Parents: Late Ram Nagina Singh (Ex Minister, Bihar) (father); Rajmati Devi (Ex M.L.A Maner) (mother)
- Education: MA (political science) in 1984
- Profession: Politician, Social Worker, Farmer

Srikant Nirala also known Srikant Yadav as was an Indian politician. He was elected to the Bihar Legislative Assembly from Maner (Vidhan Sabha constituency) from 1990 to 1995, 1995–2000, and 2005–2010 as a member of Bihar Legislative Assembly as a member of the Rashtriya Janata Dal. Srikant Nirala left RJD in 2010 and joined JDU. His father also served as a member of Bihar Legislative Assembly & former Minister of Bihar, Ram Nagina Singh thrice from this constituency & his mother also served as a member of Bihar Legislative Assembly, Rajmati Devi twice from this constituency. He left JDU to join BJP in 2015. Later he was an Independent.
