= Ghoswari =

- Town
- Ghoswari Community Development Block
- Location in Bihar, India Ghoswari (India)
- Coordinates: 25.36116°N 85.89491°E
- Country: India
- State: Bihar
- District: Patna district
- Division: Magadh

Government
  - Type: Municipal Council and Panchayat
  - Body: Chairman and Gram Panchayats

Population (2011)
  - Total: 74,898

Languages
- Time zone: UTC+5:30 (IST)
- PIN: 803302
- Telephone code: +91-6132
- Vehicle registration: BR 01

Ghoswari is a town and a municipal council in barh of Patna district in the Indian state of Bihar. The postal index number of Ghoswari is 803212.

== Demographics ==
Ghoswari block has a total population of 74,898 as per census of 2011, in which 39,776 are males and 35,122 are females. Ghoswari had a literacy rate of 50.6%, lower than the state average of 61.8%. 98.85% of the population were Hindus, with the remaining 1.15% from ethnic minorities; .16% of the population were Muslims.

== Villages ==
- Samya Garh
- Daudpur Tirmohani
- Dhanak Dobh
- Gorhiari
- Goshain Gaon
- Karara
- Keoti
- Mohanpur
- Alinagar
- Paijuna
- Sahri
- Ghoswari
- Balwa
- Chak Lodi
- Ishanagar
- Kurmichak
- Mor (part In Mokameh)
- Sahri
- Malpur
- Milki
- Masume Chak
- Milki
