= Dinanath Singh Yadav =

Indian politician

Member of Bihar Legislative Assembly
- In office 2000–2005
- Preceded by: Chandradeo Prasad Verma
- Succeeded by: Nand Kumar Nanda
- Constituency: Paliganj

Personal details
- Party: Rashtriya Janata Dal
- Parent: Ramji Yadav (father)
- Education: Magadh University
- Profession: Politician

Dinanath Singh Yadav is an Indian politician. He was elected to the Bihar Legislative Assembly from Paliganj constituency as the 2000 Member of Bihar Legislative Assembly as a member of the Rashtriya Janata Dal.
