= Danapur Assembly constituency =

Assembly constituency in Bihar, India

Danapur
- Constituency No. 186 for the Bihar Legislative Assembly

Constituency details
- Country: India
- Region: East India
- State: Bihar
- District: Patna
- Established: 1957
- Total electors: 376,759

Member of Legislative Assembly
- 18th Bihar Legislative Assembly
- Incumbent Ram Kripal Yadav
- Party: BJP
- Alliance: NDA
- Elected year: 2025

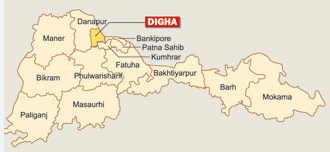
Danapur in Patna district

Danapur is one of 243 constituencies of legislative assembly of Bihar. It comes under Pataliputra Lok Sabha constituency along with other assembly constituencies viz. Masaurhi, Maner, Phulwari, Paliganj and Bikram.

== Overview ==
Danapur comprises CD Block Danapur-Cum-Khagaul. The diara (riverine) area is also part of Danapur assembly constituency.

== Members of the Legislative Assembly ==
Year	Name	Party
1957	Jagat Narayan Lal	Indian National Congress
1962	Ram Sewak Singh	Socialist Party
1967	Ram Sewak Singh	Samyukta Socialist Party
1969	Budh Deo Singh	Indian National Congress
1972	Budh Deo Singh	Indian National Congress
1977	Ram Lakhan Singh Yadav	Indian National Congress
1980	Budh Deo Singh	Indian National Congress (I)
1985	Vijendra Rai	Independent
1990	Vijendra Rai	Janata Dal
1995	Lalu Prasad Yadav	Janata Dal
1996^	Vijay Singh Yadav	Bharatiya Janata Party
2000	Lalu Prasad Yadav	Rashtriya Janata Dal
2002^	Rama Nand Yadav	Rashtriya Janata Dal
2005	Asha Devi Sinha	Bharatiya Janata Party
2005	Asha Devi Sinha	Bharatiya Janata Party
2010	Asha Devi Sinha	Bharatiya Janata Party
2015	Asha Devi Sinha	Bharatiya Janata Party
2020	Ritlal Yadav	Rashtriya Janata Dal
2025	Ram Kripal Yadav	Bharatiya Janata Party

== Election results ==
=== 2025 ===
Bihar Legislative Assembly Election, 2025: Danapur
Party	Candidate	Votes	%	±%
BJP	Ram Kripal Yadav	119,877	54.41	▲14.55
RJD	Ritlal Yadav	90,744	41.19	▼7.25
Independent	Shailesh K.R Dhiraj	2,786	1.26	
NOTA	None of the above	3,242	1.47	▲0.22
Majority		29,133	13.22	▲4.64
Turnout		220,307	58.47	▲5.98
BJP gain from RJD		Swing	14.55	

=== 2020 ===
Bihar Legislative Assembly Election, 2020: Danapur
Party	Candidate	Votes	%	±%
RJD	Ritlal Yadav	89,895	48.44	+8.33
BJP	Asha Devi Sinha	73,971	39.86	−3.37
RLSP	Deepak Kumar	7,731	4.17	
Independent	Ganesh Ray	2,265	1.22	
NOTA	None of the above	2,315	1.25	−0.71
Majority		15,924	8.58	+5.46
Turnout		185,563	52.49	+0.54
RJD gain from BJP		Swing		

=== 2015 ===
Bihar Assembly election, 2015: Danapur
Party	Candidate	Votes	%	±%
BJP	Asha Devi Sinha	72,192	43.23	
RJD	Raj Kishor Yadav	66,983	40.11	
Independent	Tinku Yadav	13,002	7.79	
BSP	Narsingh Kumar	3,246	1.94	
Bharatiya Momin Front	Akash Kumar	1,518	0.91	
NOTA	None of the above	3,267	1.96	
Majority		5,209	3.12	
Turnout		166,986	51.95	
BJP hold		Swing		

=== 2010 ===
Bihar Assembly election, 2010: Danapur
Party	Candidate	Votes	%	±%
BJP	Asha Devi Sinha	59,425	47.52	
Independent	Ritlal Yadav	41,506	33.19	
RJD	Sachchidanand Rai	11,495	9.19	
INC	Vijay Singh Yadav	3,608	2.89	
Independent	Binod Singh	2,969	2.37	
Majority		17,919	14.33	
Turnout		1,25,050	40.96	
BJP hold		Swing		

=== 2000 ===
- Lalu Prasad Yadav (RJD) : 64,085 votes
- Rama Nand Yadav (BJP): 46,530 votes

==== 2002 bypoll ====
- Rama Nand Yadav (RJD): 75,935 votes
- SatyanaranSinha (BJP): 17,928 votes

=== 1977 ===
- Ram Lakhan Singh Yadav (INC): 33,989 votes
- Chhabila Singh (JNP): 29,292 votes

=== 1972 ===
- Budh Deo Singh (INC): 23,150 votes
- Keshav Prasad (SOP): 15,843 votes
- Ram Swarath Singh (NCO): 9,550 votes
- Tej Narain Prasad (Bharatiya Jana Sangh): 5,456 votes

=== 1957 ===
- Jagat Narayan Lal (INC): 7,042 votes
- Radhey Shyam Singh (IND): 6,074 votes

== See also ==
- List of Assembly constituencies of Bihar
- Danapur
