= Rameshwar Prasad Shastri =

Indian freedom fighter

Rameshwar Prasad Shastri was an Indian freedom fighter and political activist. He was the first elected Member of Legislative Assembly from Maner Constituency. He won the 1952 Bihar Legislative Assembly election on Indian National Congress ticket. He won with the margin of 5811 votes against the independent candidate Jagdeo Prasad Singh. He received 40% votes share in the election.
