= Üllar =

Male given name

- Gender: Male
- Language: Estonian

Origin
- Region of origin: Estonia

Other names
- Related names: Ülar, Ülari

Üllar is an Estonian masculine given name.

People named Üllar include:

- Üllar Jörberg (1941–2018), singer
- Üllar Kerde (born 1954), basketball coach
- Vahur-Üllar Kersna (born 1962), journalist
- Üllar Peterson, historian
- Üllar Põld (born 1962), actor and alpinist
- Üllar Saaremäe (born 1969), actor and theatre director

== See also ==
- Ullar (Heroscape), a general in the game HeroScape
