= Sandeep Saurav =

Indian politician (born 1988)

Bihar Legislative Assembly
- Constituency: Paliganj (Vidhan Sabha constituency)

Personal details
- Party: Communist Party of India (Marxist–Leninist) (Liberation)
- Occupation: Politics

Sandeep Saurav (born 1988) is an Indian politician from Bihar and a member of Bihar Legislative Assembly representing the Paliganj Assembly constituency in Patna district. He is from CPI(ML)L and was elected in the 2020 Bihar election, securing 67,917 votes against the incumbent MLA Jai Vardhan Yadav from JD(U) who secured 37,002 votes. He was nominated to contest the 2024 Indian General Election in Bihar from the Nalanda seat against the incumbent MP Kaushalendra Kumar of JD(U).

== Early life and education ==
Saurav hails from Maner, a satellite town in Patna metropolitan region, Bihar. His father was a farmer. He completed his graduation from Patna University. Later, he joined the Centre of Indian Languages under School of Languages in Jawaharlal Nehru University, Delhi, where he also completed his M.A. in 2009, M.Phil. and Ph.D. in 2014 in Hindi.

== Career ==
Saurav left his job as an assistant professor and joined politics. He contested as an MLA candidate for the first time in 2020 and was elected from Paliganj seat.

=== Student leader ===
Saurav was the National General Secretary of All India Students Association, a left wing students organisation. He is the leader of Communist Party of India (Marxist–Leninist) (Liberation). Earlier, he was the councillor and general secretary of the JNU Students' Union in 2013.

=== MLA ===
Saurav won the 2020 Bihar Legislative Assembly Election representing (CPI-ML) (Liberation) from Paliganj Assembly Constituency in Bihar State Legislative Assembly as a Mahagathbandhan nominee. He defeated JD (U) candidate Jai Vardhan Yadav by a margin of 30,915 votes and with a vote share of 44.27 per cent.

== Electoral record ==
=== 2024 Nalanda Lok Sabha constituency ===
2024 Indian general election: Nalanda
Party	Candidate	Votes	%	±%
JD(U)	Kaushalendra Kumar	559,422	48.9	
CPI(ML)L	Sandeep Saurav	3,90,308	34.1	
NOTA	None of the above			
Majority		169114		
Turnout				
JD(U) hold		Swing		

=== Bihar State Legislative Assembly Election 2020 ===
Bihar Assembly election, 2020: Paliganj
Party	Candidate	Votes	%	±%
CPI(ML)L	Sandeep Saurav	67,917	43.73	
JD(U)	Jai Vardhan Yadav	37,002	23.83	
LJP	Usha Vidyarthi	16,102	10.37	
RLSP	Madhu Manjari	5,467	3.52	
Independent	Sunil Kumar	5,261	3.39	
Independent	Gopal Chaudhari	4,444	2.86	
NOTA	None of the above	1,881	1.21	
Majority		30,915	19.90	
