= Paliganj Assembly constituency =

Assembly constituency in Bihar, India

- Constituency No. 190 for the Bihar Legislative Assembly

Constituency details
- Country: India
- Region: East India
- State: Bihar
- District: Patna
- Lok Sabha constituency: Pataliputra
- Established: 1951
- Total electors: 285,778

Member of Legislative Assembly
- 18th Bihar Legislative Assembly
- Incumbent Sandeep Saurav
- Party: CPI(ML)L
- Alliance: MGB
- Elected year: 2025

Paliganj Assembly constituency is one of 243 constituencies of legislative assembly of Bihar. It comes under Pataliputra Lok Sabha constituency along with other assembly constituencies viz. Danapur, Maner, Phulwari, Masaurhi and Bikram.

== Overview ==
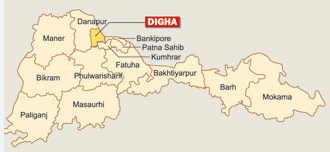
Paliganj in Patna district

Paliganj comprises CD Blocks Dulhin Bazar & Paliganj.

== Members of the Legislative Assembly ==
Year	Name	Party
1952	Ram Lakhan Singh Yadav	Indian National Congress
1957	Chandradeo Prasad Verma	Praja Socialist Party
1962	Ram Lakhan Singh Yadav	Indian National Congress
1967	Chandradeo Prasad Verma	Samyukta Socialist Party
1969	Chandradeo Prasad Verma	Samyukta Socialist Party
1972	Kanhai Singh	Indian National Congress (O)
1977	Kanhai Singh	Independent
1980	Ram Lakhan Singh Yadav	Indian National Congress (U)
1985	Ram Lakhan Singh Yadav	Indian National Congress
1990	Ram Lakhan Singh Yadav	Indian National Congress
1991^	Chandradeo Prasad Verma	Janata Dal
1995	Chandradeo Prasad Verma	Janata Dal
1996^	Janardan Sharma	Bharatiya Janata Party
2000	Dinanath Singh Yadav	Rashtriya Janata Dal
2005	Nand Kumar Nanda	Communist Party of India (Marxist–Leninist) Liberation
2010	Usha Vidyarthi	Bharatiya Janata Party
2015	Jai Vardhan Yadav	Rashtriya Janata Dal
2020	Sandeep Yadav	Communist Party of India (Marxist–Leninist) Liberation
2025	Sandeep Yadav	Communist Party of India (Marxist–Leninist) Liberation

^by-election

== Election results ==
=== 2025 ===
Bihar Legislative Assembly election, 2025: Paliganj
Party	Candidate	Votes	%	±%
CPI(ML)L	Sandeep Saurav	81,105	44.48	+0.75
LJP(RV)	Sunil Kumar	74,450	40.83	
JSP	Shyam Nandan Sharma	6,612	3.63	
BSP	Sushant	2,745	1.51	
AAP	Shivnath Kumar	1,812	0.99	
NOTA	None of the above	3,191	1.75	+0.54
Majority		6,655	3.65	−16.25
Turnout		182,320	63.8	+9.09
CPI(ML)L hold		Swing		

=== 2020 ===
2020 Bihar Legislative Assembly election: Paliganj
Party	Candidate	Votes	%	±%
CPI(ML)L	Sandeep Yadav	67,917	43.73	
JD(U)	Jai Vardhan Yadav	37,002	23.83	
LJP	Usha Vidyarthi	16,102	10.37	
RLSP	Madhu Manjari	5,467	3.52	
Independent	Sunil Kumar	5,261	3.39	
Independent	Gopal Chaudhari	4,444	2.86	
LPSP	Dinanath Pandit	1,767	1.14	
Independent	Dhananjay Kumar	1,543	0.99	
Bhartiya Sablog Party	Ravish Kumar	1,497	0.96	
Shoshit Samaj Dal	Sant Kumar Singh	1,443	0.93	
NOTA	None of the above	1,881	1.21	−0.52
Majority		30,915	19.9	+3.18
Turnout		155,296	54.71	−1.05
CPI(ML)L gain from RJD		Swing		

=== 2015 ===
2015 Bihar Legislative Assembly election: Paliganj
Party	Candidate	Votes	%	±%
RJD	Jai Vardhan Yadav	65,932	45.08	
BJP	Ram Janm Sharma	41,479	28.36	
CPI(ML)L	Anwar Husain	19,438	13.29	
Independent	Chandan Kumar	5,145	3.52	
BSP	Alakh Niranjan Pal	2,424	1.66	
Independent	Hare Krishn Singh	1,947	1.33	
Independent	Pratibha Jha	1,806	1.23	
Independent	Lakshman Sharma	1,628	1.11	
NOTA	None of the above	2,524	1.73	
Majority		24,453	16.72	
Turnout		146,255	55.76	
RJD gain from BJP		Swing		

== See also ==
- List of constituencies of Bihar Legislative Assembly
