= Virendra Yadav =

Indian politician (born 1961)

Bhai Virendra Yadav
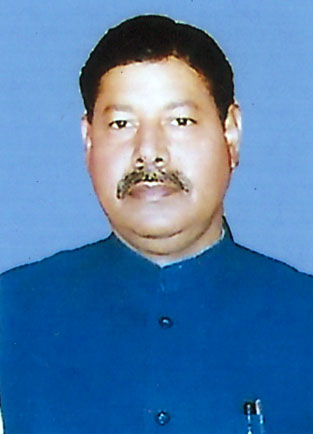

Member of Bihar Legislative Assembly
- Preceded by: Srikant Nirala
- Constituency: Maner
- In office 2000–2005
- In office 2010–2015
- In office 2015–2020
- In office 2020–2025
- Incumbent
- Assumed office 2025

Personal details
- Born: Bhai Virendra Yadav; 3 May 1961 (age 65) Maner, Bihar, India
- Party: Rashtriya Janata Dal
- Education: B.A Magadh University
- Profession: Politician, social worker

Bhai Virendra Yadav (born 3 May 1961) is an Indian politician. He was elected to the Bihar Legislative Assembly from Maner in the 2010 Bihar Legislative Assembly elections, as a member of the Rashtriya Janata Dal. Currently he is serving as a Main spokesman of Bihar RJD Party.

Virendra was interested in contesting from Patliputra in the 2019 Lok Sabha election but was opposed by Tej Pratap Yadav, as the latter's elder sister Misa Bharti was contesting from that seat.

she is currently the chairman of the Public Accounts Committee (PAC), Bihar Vidhan Sabha.

== Controversy ==
In July 2025, Bhai Virendra Yadav was involved in a widely publicized controversy after an audio clip of a phone call between him and a panchayat secretary went viral on social media. In the clip, Virendra can be heard threatening the official with the phrase "joote se maarenge" ("will beat you with a shoe") while demanding swift action on a death certificate issue. When the official failed to recognize him, Virendra allegedly responded, "You don’t know Bhai Virendra?"

The panchayat secretary, Sandip Kumar, filed a formal complaint under the Scheduled Castes and Scheduled Tribes (Prevention of Atrocities) Act, alleging caste-based abuse and intimidation.

The incident sparked widespread reactions online and led to comparisons with fictional political drama from the popular Indian web series Panchayat. Virendra later acknowledged using strong language but claimed it was a reaction to the official's tone and accused the official of violating his privacy by recording the call.

The episode made him the subject of widespread memes and commentary across Indian social media platforms.
