= Ülar =

Male given name

- Gender: Male
- Language: Estonian

Origin
- Region of origin: Estonia

Other names
- Related names: Üllar, Ülari

Ülar is an Estonian masculine given name.

People named Ülar include:

- Ülar Mark (born 1968), architect
- Ülar Ploom (born 1955), linguist and poet
- Ülar Vomm (born 1962), military commander

== See also ==
- Üllar
