= Chandradeo Prasad Verma =

Indian politician (born 1921)

Member of Parliament, Lok Sabha
- In office 1996–1998
- Preceded by: Ram Lakhan Singh Yadav
- Succeeded by: H. P. Singh
- In office 1977–1984
- Preceded by: Bali Ram Bhagat
- Succeeded by: Bali Ram Bhagat
- Constituency: Arrah, Bihar

Personal details
- Born: 21 January 1921 Purushottampur Painathi, Patna District, Bihar, British India
- Died: 30 April 2005 (aged 84) Patna, Bihar
- Party: Janata Dal
- Other political affiliations: Janata Party, RJD, Samyukta Socialist Party, Congress Socialist Party, Lok Dal
- Spouse: Panna Devi Verma

Chandradeo Prasad Verma (21 January 1921– 30 April 2005) was a politician who was elected to the Lok Sabha, the lower house of Parliament of India from the Arrah, Bihar in 1977, 1980 and 1996. He was the Union Minister of State for Rural Areas and Employment. He was earlier Member of the Bihar Legislative Assembly and a Cabinet minister in Bihar.

== Life and political career ==
Verma was a member of Koeri community. He participated in Indian independence movement and was also involved in the labour strike of 1940 in South Bihar Sugar Mills at Bihta (Patna) under the leadership of Swami Sahajanand Saraswati. He was put behind the bars for his involvement in this movement. He also took participation in Quit India Movement of 1942 and was arrested by the British authorities in 1943. During this period, he underwent two years of rigorous imprisonment in Central Jail, Patna, Gaya and Phoolwari Sharif camp. He also involved himself in the revolutionary activities after release from jail in 1945.

During this period, when the struggle for indian independence was on its peak, he made attempts to blast the Bikram Airport (Patna) in order to defy the colonial rule. He was made president of Bihar State Leather Industries Association, Patna, from 1957 to 1984; and of Bihar State Telephone Employees Union, Trade Union Patna for 1958-62 after independence of India. Verma was the founder, secretary of G.J. College, Rambagh at Bihta, Patna, in 1957. He also served as president of Jai Prakash Ashram, Paliganj, Patna. Despite holding a number of offices, he was again involved in 1974 Total Revolution, which was started by Jayprakash Narayan against the authoritarian rule of Indira Gandhi government from Bihar. Verma also struggled for the cause of low-income groups and lower strata of society and was associated with Bihar State Class IV Employees Association, from 1969 to 1984. As a leader of workers he was a participant in Fatuha-Islampur and Arrah-Sasaram Light Railway Employees Union from 1984 to 1985. In the later years of his life, he became a member of Mahatma Phule Trust, Patna and remained associated with it till 1990. He was also a member of Bihar Rajya Swatantrata Sainani Sangathan, Patna in 1992, the organisation representing the freedom fighters who participated in indian war of independence from the state of Bihar.

Verma was close to Jagdeo Prasad, during initial year of his life. He is said to have persuaded Prasad to read various political ideologies and philosophers in order to work for improvement of social status of Dalits. Being persuaded by him, Prasad followed him and later emerged as the emancipator of the lower castes through the politics of socialism. He even founded his own Shoshit Samaj Dal, when he developed ideological conflicts with the leadership of Samyukta Socialist Party.

== Social and cultural activities ==
He was the editor of a journal brought out by Bihar Rajya Swantrata Sainani Sangathan and also worked as an Assistant Editor and Secretary in Janata a Hindi daily published from Patna during 1951–52. Later, he became the Chief Editor of Janata which became a weekly from 1952 and remained so till 1957. He also fought against social injustice and supported the cause of socially oppressed people. Verma worked for the interests of the backwards and the Dalits and took up the case of 384 civilian employees of Air-Force-2 B.R.D. stationed at Gwalior. As a leader of trade unionists, he actively pursued the cause of Arrah-Sasaram Light Railway and Fatuha Islampur Martins Light-Railway employees for their regularisation, who were facing the threat of eviction due to government policies.

== Offices held ==
- 1937-48 Member, Congress Socialist Party, Bihar
- 1957-62 Chief Whip, Praja Socialist Party, Bihar
- 1957-62,1967-72 Member, Bihar Legislative Assembly
- 1967-70 Chief Secretary, Samyukta Socialist Party, Bihar
- 1970-71 Cabinet Minister, Agriculture, Bihar
- 1973-74 Secretary, Central Parliamentary Board, Socialist Party
- 1977 Elected to Lok Sabha (Sixth)
- 1977-80 Member, Committee on Private Members Bills and Resolutions
- 1980 Re-elected to Lok Sabha (Seventh)
- 1980 Member, National Executive, Lok Dal
- 1993-95 Cabinet Minister, Health and Family Welfare, Education,
- April 1995- Cabinet Minister, Excise and Prohibition, Bihar
- June 1996- Union Minister of State, Rural Areas and Employment

== See also ==
- Rati Lal Prasad Verma
- Ajit Kumar Mehta
- Kameshwar Prasad Singh
