= Dulhin Bazar =

- Town
- Location in Bihar, India
- Coordinates: 25.382°N 84.858°E
- Country: India
- State: Bihar
- District: Patna
- Elevation: 55 m (180 ft)

Population (2011)
  - Total: About 35,000

Languages
  - Official: Magahi, Hindi
- Time zone: UTC+5:30 (IST)
- Postal code: 801102

Dulhin Bazar is a town and Block in Patna district, Bihar state, India.
