= Phulwari Assembly constituency =

Assembly constituency in Bihar, India

Coordinates: 25°34′33″N 85°4′6″E

Phulwari
- Constituency No. 188 for the Bihar Legislative Assembly

Constituency details
- Country: India
- Region: East India
- State: Bihar
- Division: Patna
- District: Patna
- Established: 1977
- Total electors: 386,351

Member of Legislative Assembly
- 18th Bihar Legislative Assembly
- Incumbent Shyam Rajak
- Party: JD(U)
- Alliance: NDA
- Elected year: 2025
- Preceded by: Gopal Ravidas

Phulwari Assembly constituency is one of 243 constituencies of legislative assembly of Bihar. It comes under Pataliputra Lok Sabha constituency along with other assembly constituencies viz. Danapur, Maner, Masaurhi, Paliganj and Bikram. It is reserved for scheduled castes.

Most successful parties from Phulwari Assembly
1. RJD (4 times) (30.8%)
2. JD(U) (3 times) (23.1%)
3. INC (2 times) (15.4%)
4. INC(I) (1 time) (7.69%)
5. JD (1 time) (7.69%)
6. JP (1 time) (7.69%)
7. CPI(ML)L (1 time) (7.69%)

== Overview ==
Phulwari comprises CD Blocks Phulwari Sharif & Punpun.

== Members of the Legislative Assembly ==
Year	Name	Party
1977	Ramprit Paswan	Janata Party
1980	Sanjeev Prasad Tony	Indian National Congress
1985	Sanjeev Prasad Tony	Indian National Congress
1990	Sanjeev Prasad Tony	Indian National Congress
1995	Shyam Rajak	Janata Dal
2000	Shyam Rajak	Rashtriya Janata Dal
2005	Shyam Rajak	Rashtriya Janata Dal
2005	Shyam Rajak	Rashtriya Janata Dal
2009^	Uday Kumar	Rashtriya Janata Dal
2010	Shyam Rajak	Janata Dal (United)
2015	Shyam Rajak	Janata Dal (United)
2020	Gopal Ravidas	Communist Party of India (Marxist–Leninist) Liberation
2025	Shyam Rajak	Janata Dal (United)

== Election results ==
=== 2025 ===
2025 Bihar Legislative Assembly election: Phulwari
Party	Candidate	Votes	%	±%
JD(U)	Shyam Rajak	126,470	49.18	▲12.23
CPI(ML)L	Gopal Ravidas	93,813	36.48	▼7.09
JSP	Prof. Shashikant Prasad	11,100	4.32	
AAP	Arun Kumar Rajak	5,305	2.06	
Independent	Puja Kumari	3,798	1.48	
Independent	Sukesh Kumar	2,928	1.14	
RLJP	Sunil Paswan	2,598	1.01	
NOTA	None of the above	4,844	1.88	▲0.33
Majority		32,657	12.7	▲6.08
Turnout		257,134	66.55	▲9.18
JD(U) gain from CPI(ML)L		Swing	12.23	

=== 2020 ===
2020 Bihar Legislative Assembly election: Phulwari
Party	Candidate	Votes	%	±%
CPI(ML)L	Gopal Ravidas	91,124	43.57	
JD(U)	Arun Manjhi	77,267	36.95	−12.82
AIMIM	Kumari Pratibha	5,019	2.4	
Bhartiya Lok Chetna Party	Kamlesh Kant Chaudhary	3,885	1.86	
Bhartiya Sablog Party	Gajendra Manjhi	3,480	1.66	
Loktantrik Samajwadi	Shila Devi	2,283	1.09	
Independent	Laxmi Kumari	2,163	1.03	
Sanyukt Kisan Vikas Party	Amarendra Kumar	2,112	1.01	
NOTA	None of the above	3,245	1.55	+0.36
Majority		13,857	6.62	−17.56
Turnout		209,121	57.37	−0.75
CPI(ML)L gain from JD(U)		Swing		

=== 2015 ===
2015 Bihar Legislative Assembly election: Phulwari constituency
Party	Candidate	Votes	%	±%
JD(U)	Shyam Rajak	94,094	49.77	
HAM(S)	Rajeshwar Manjhi	48,381	25.59	
CPI(ML)L	Jay Prakash Paswan	11,188	5.92	
BSP	Tribhuwan Ravidas	3,380	1.79	
Independent	Manti Das	3,326	1.76	
Independent	Babita Devi	3,217	1.7	
Rashtriya Jagriti Party	Kailash Paswan	2,337	1.24	
Sarvajan Kalyan Loktantrik Party	Ujjawal Kant Hunkar	2,320	1.23	
SP	Uday Kumar	2,312	1.22	
Ittehad-E-Millait Council	Mishri Ram	2,033	1.08	
Independent	Shyam Chaudhary	2,018	1.07	
Samras Samaj Party	Ram Tirth Paswan	2,011	1.06	
Lok Awaz Dal	Shankar Chaudhary	1,791	0.95	
Unknown	Rajendra Chaudhary	1,697	0.9	
NOTA	None of the above	2,253	1.19	
Majority		45,713	24.18	
Turnout		189,057	58.12	
JD(U) hold		Swing		

=== 2010 ===
Bihar assembly elections, 2010: Phulwari
Party	Candidate	Votes	%	±%
JD(U)	Shyam Rajak	67,390	49.75	
RJD	Uday Kumar	46,210	34.11	
AIMIM	Kumari Pratibha	5,019	2.4	
Turnout				
Registered electors				
JD(U) gain from RJD		Swing		
