= Pataliputra Lok Sabha constituency =

Lok Sabha Constituency in Bihar

Coordinates: 25.6°N 85.1°E

Pataliputra
- Lok Sabha constituency

Constituency details
- Country: India
- Region: East India
- State: Bihar
- Assembly constituencies: Danapur; Maner; Phulwari; Masaurhi; Paliganj; Bikram
- Established: 2008
- Total electors: 16.5 lakh
- Reservation: None

Member of Parliament
- 18th Lok Sabha
- Incumbent Misha Bharti
- Party: RJD
- Alliance: INDIA
- Elected year: 2024
- Preceded by: Ram Kripal Yadav, BJP

Pataliputra is one of the 543 parliamentary constituencies in India. The constituency is located in Patna district in Bihar. Until 2008, there was only one Lok Sabha seat for Patna, capital of Bihar.

Most Successful parties from Pataliputra Lok Sabha
1. BJP (2 Times) (40.0%)
2. INC(1 Times) (20.0%)
3. JDU (1 time) (20.0%)
4. RJD (1 time) (20.0%)

== Assembly constituencies ==
Assembly constituencies in Pataliputra (Lok Sabha constituency):

| # | Name | District | Member | Party | 2024 lead |
|---|---|---|---|---|---|
| 186 | Danapur | Patna | Ram Kripal Yadav | BJP | BJP |
| 187 | Maner | Patna | Bhai Virendra | RJD | RJD |
| 188 | Phulwari (SC) | Patna | Shyam Rajak | JD(U) | RJD |
| 189 | Masaurhi (SC) | Patna | Arun Manjhi | JD(U) | RJD |
| 190 | Paliganj | Patna | Sandeep Saurav | CPI(ML)L | RJD |
| 191 | Bikram | Patna | Siddharth Saurav | BJP | RJD |

== Members of Parliament ==
| Year | Name | Party |
|---|---|---|
| 1952 | Sarangdhar Sinha | Indian National Congress |
1957-2009 : See Patna Lok Sabha constituency
| 2009 | Ranjan Prasad Yadav | Janata Dal (United) |
| 2014 | Ram Kripal Yadav | Bharatiya Janata Party |
| 2019 | Ram Kripal Yadav | Bharatiya Janata Party |
| 2024 | Misa Bharti | Rashtriya Janata Dal |

== Election results ==
=== 2024 ===
2024 Indian general election: Pataliputra
| Party | Candidate | Votes | % | ±% |
|---|---|---|---|---|
| RJD | Misa Bharti | 613,283 | 49.86 | ▲6.23 |
| BJP | Ram Kripal Yadav | 528,109 | 42.93 | ▼4.35 |
| NOTA | None of the above | 5,606 | 0.46 | ▼0.15 |
| Majority | | 85,174 | 6.93 | ▲3.28 |
| Turnout | | 1,230,694 | 59.15 | ▲3.12 |
| RJD gain from BJP | | Swing | ▲6.23 | |

=== 2019 ===
2019 Indian general election: Pataliputra
| Party | Candidate | Votes | % | ±% |
|---|---|---|---|---|
| BJP | Ram Kripal Yadav | 509,557 | 47.28 | ▲8.12 |
| RJD | Misha Bharti | 470,236 | 43.63 | ▲8.59 |
| BSP | Mohammad Kalimullah | 14,045 | 1.30 | ▼0.46 |
| BAAP | Shailesh Kumar | 9,628 | 0.89 | N/A |
| APKSP | Shiv Kumar Singh | 8,354 | 0.78 | N/A |
| NOTA | None of the Above | 6,576 | 0.61 | ▲0.13 |
| Majority | | 39,321 | 3.65 | ▼0.47 |
| Turnout | | 10,78,809 | 56.03 | ▼0.34 |
| BJP hold | | Swing | ▲8.12 | |

=== General election 2014 ===
2014 Indian general elections: Pataliputra
| Party | Candidate | Votes | % | ±% |
|---|---|---|---|---|
| BJP | Ram Kripal Yadav | 383,262 | 39.16 | N/A |
| RJD | Misha Bharti | 342,940 | 35.04 | ▼4.07 |
| JD(U) | Ranjan Prasad Yadav | 97,228 | 9.93 | ▼32.93 |
| CPI(ML)L | Rameshwar Prasad | 51,623 | 5.27 | ▼0.59 |
| BSP | Raj Kumar Ram | 17,188 | 1.76 | ▼0.51 |
| NOTA | None of the Above | 4,678 | 0.48 | N/A |
| Majority | | 40,322 | 4.12 | ▲0.37 |
| Turnout | | 978,795 | 56.38 | ▲15.21 |
| BJP gain from JD(U) | | Swing | ▲3.70 | |

=== General election 2009 ===
2009 Indian general elections: Pataliputra
| Party | Candidate | Votes | % | ±% |
|---|---|---|---|---|
| JD(U) | Ranjan Prasad Yadav | 269,298 | 42.86 | |
| RJD | Lalu Prasad Yadav | 245,757 | 39.12 | |
| CPI(ML)L | Rameshwar Prasad | 36,837 | 5.86 | |
| INC | Vijay Singh Yadav | 18,504 | 2.95 | |
| BSP | Harendra Kumar Patel | 14,269 | 2.27 | |
| Independent | Sunil Kumar Singh | 10,882 | 1.73 | |
| Majority | | 23,541 | 3.74 | |
| Turnout | | 628,283 | 41.17 | |
| JD(U) win (new seat) | | | | |

== See also ==
- List of constituencies of the Lok Sabha
- Pataliputra Lok Sabha constituency (1951-1957)
- Patna Lok Sabha constituency
- Patna Sahib Lok Sabha constituency
