= Gopal Ravidas =

Indian politician

Gopal Mohan Ravidas

Member of the Bihar Legislative Assembly
- In office 16 November 2020 – 2025
- Preceded by: Shyam Rajak
- Succeeded by: Shyam Rajak
- Constituency: Phulwari

Personal details
- Born: 15 January 1966 (age 60) Patna, Bihar
- Party: CPI(ML)L
- Education: Patna University (B.A)

Gopal Ravidas is an Indian politician from Bihar and a Member of the Bihar Legislative Assembly. Ravidas won the Phulwari Assembly constituency on the Communist Party of India (Marxist–Leninist) Liberation ticket in the 2020 Bihar Legislative Assembly election.
