= Shyam Rajak =

Indian politician

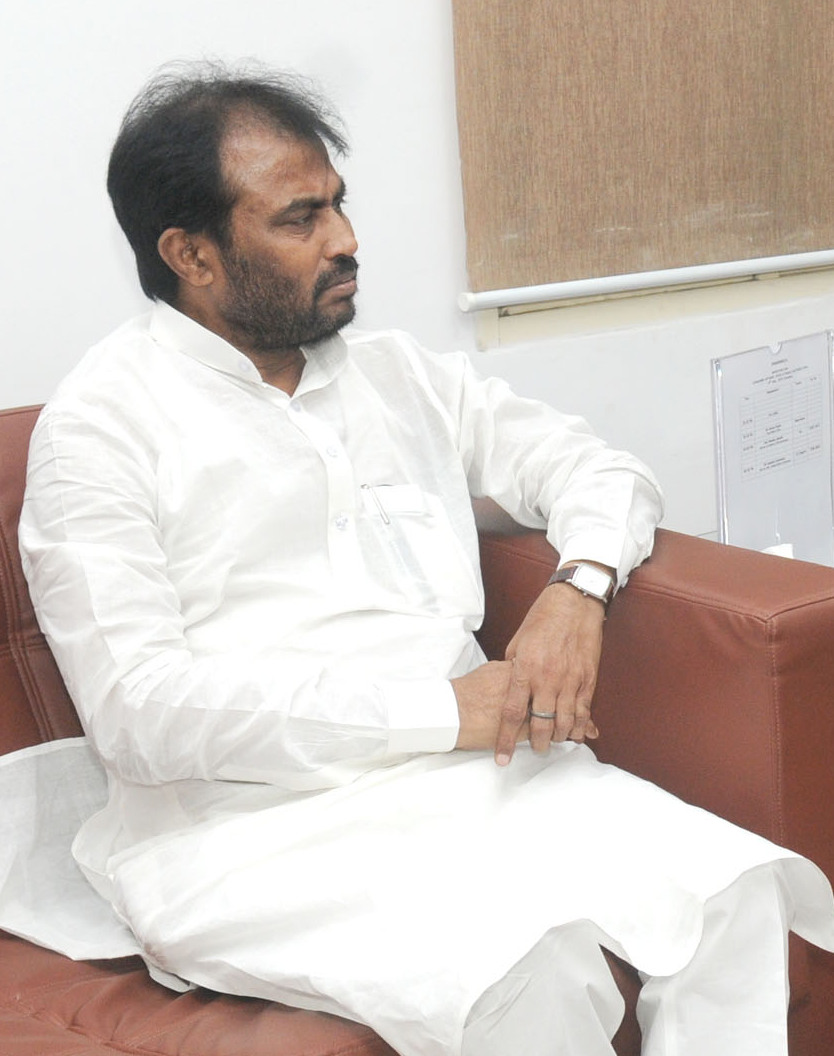

Cabinet Minister for Industries, Government of Bihar
- In office 2019-2020
- Preceded by: Jai Kumar Singh
- Succeeded by: Renu Devi

Member Of Bihar Legislative Assembly
- In office 1995-2020
- Preceded by: Sanjeev Prasad Tony
- Succeeded by: Gopal Ravidas
- Constituency: Phulwari

Minister of Food & Consumer Protection, Government of Bihar
- In office 2010-2015
- Preceded by: Narendra Singh
- Succeeded by: Madan Sahni

Personal details
- Born: 22 July 1954 (age 72)
- Party: JDU (2009-2020); (September 2024-Present)
- Other political affiliations: RJD (Until 2009; 2020-August 2024)
- Spouse: Alka Verma

Shyam Rajak is an Indian Leader from Janata Dal (United), previously serving as the Cabinet Minister for Industries in the Government of Bihar under Nitish Kumar. He has previously served as Minister for Food and Consumer Protection from 2010-2015 in the JD(U) Government. In the 2025 Bihar Legislative Assembly election, Rajak won the Phulwarisharif (SC) seat as the JDU candidate, defeating incumbent MLA Gopal Ravidas by 32,657 votes and securing 126,470 votes (49.18%). He has also served as Minister of State for Energy, Public Relations Department and Law in Bihar government in the RJD rule under Rabri Devi. He is whip for main opposition party in Bihar legislative Assembly.

== Early life and education ==
Shyam Rajak was born on 22 July 1954 . He hails from the Sabjibagh area of Patna and completed his Bachelor’s degree in Commerce. His marriage to film maker Vikash Verma's sister Alka Verma, from Mumbai, was a love marriage that faced initial familial resistance due to caste and social norms; the couple had to work through these challenges over seven years before officially tying the knot.

Rajak’s wedding to Alka Verma was widely reported for its luxury and grandeur. Held at The Regent Hotel (Taj Lands End) in Mumbai, the event became one of the most talked-about weddings of the year, blending political prominence with Bollywood glamour. Media outlets described it as a lavish celebration attended by several high-profile personalities, including former Bihar Chief Minister Lalu Prasad Yadav, actors Shah Rukh Khan, Shekhar Suman, Sunil Shetty, Pooja Batra, Jackie Shroff, Aditya Pancholi, Amrita Arora, Sharad Kapoor, and filmmaker Subhash Ghai. The opulent arrangements, star-studded attendance, and festive atmosphere made it stand out as a symbol of luxury and social prestige at the time.

For the first time in the history of Bihar, a scheduled Assembly session was postponed for the wedding of Rajak. The decision was reportedly taken on the request of Vikash Verma, who stated that the wedding date, set by the bride’s family, could not be changed, referring to a remark attributed to Lalu Prasad Yadav that dates fixed by the girl’s side are never altered.

== Political career ==
=== Early political engagement ===
Rajak began his political journey through student activism and was actively involved in the JP (Jayaprakash Narayan) movement of 1974.

=== Legislative tenure ===
He was first elected as MLA from the Phulwari Sharif constituency (a reserved Dalit seat) in 1995, representing RJD. Rajak went on to secure reelection in 2000, February 2005, and November 2005.

In the 2025 Bihar Legislative Assembly election, Shyam Rajak contested from the Phulwarisharif (SC) constituency on a Janata Dal (United) (JDU) ticket. He defeated the incumbent MLA, Gopal Ravidas of the CPI (ML) Liberation, by a margin of 32,657 votes. Rajak obtained 126,470 votes, corresponding to 49.18% of the total.

=== Ministerial roles ===
Under the RJD government led by Rabri Devi, Rajak served as Minister of State for Energy, Public Relations, and Law. He later switched allegiance to JD(U) in 2009 and within the Nitish Kumar-led government (2010–2015), he held the portfolio of Minister for Food and Consumer Protection. Thereafter, he served as Cabinet Minister for Industries from 2019 to 2020. Additionally, in February 2016 he was appointed Deputy Leader of the House in the Bihar Legislative Assembly.

== Social engagement ==
Rajak has also held the position of National President of the Akhil Bharatiya Dhobi Mahasangh, reflecting his continued engagement with his community and social issues.
