= Rameshwar Prasad =

Rameshwar Prasad may refer to:

- Rameshwar Prasad (politician, born 1947), member of the Lok Sabha, and member of Bihar Legislative Assembly
- Rameshwar Prasad (Uttar Pradesh politician) (c. 1930s–2020)

== See also ==
- Rameshwar Prasad Sinha, Indian statesman and participant in the Indian independence movement
- Rameshwar Prasad Yadav, member of Bihar Legislative Assembly
