= Jai Vardhan Yadav =

Indian politician

Member of Bihar Legislative Assembly
- In office 2015–2020
- Preceded by: Usha Vidyarthi
- Succeeded by: Sandeep Yadav
- Constituency: Paliganj

Personal details
- Born: 27 July 1978 (age 48) Patna, Bihar, India
- Party: Janata Dal (United) (2020-till); Rashtriya Janata Dal (2010–2020); Indian National Congress (before 2010)
- Relatives: Ram Lakhan Singh Yadav (Grandfather); Prakash Chandra Yadav (father); Kriti Singh Yadav (wife)
- Education: Delhi University
- Profession: Politician

Jai Vardhan Yadav (alias Bachcha Yadav; born 27 July 1978) is an Indian politician. He was elected to the Bihar Legislative Assembly from Paliganj assembly. Yadav started his political career in 2005 from Raghopur assembly as a member of Indian National Congress party but lost. In 2015 he was elected Member of Bihar Legislative Assembly as a member of the Rashtriya Janata Dal. He is a grandson of Ram Lakhan Singh Yadav. He left the Rashtriya Janata Dal on 20 August 2020 and same day joined Janata Dal (United) in the presence of cabinet minister Bijendra Prasad Yadav.
