= Patna district =

District in Bihar, India

- District of Bihar
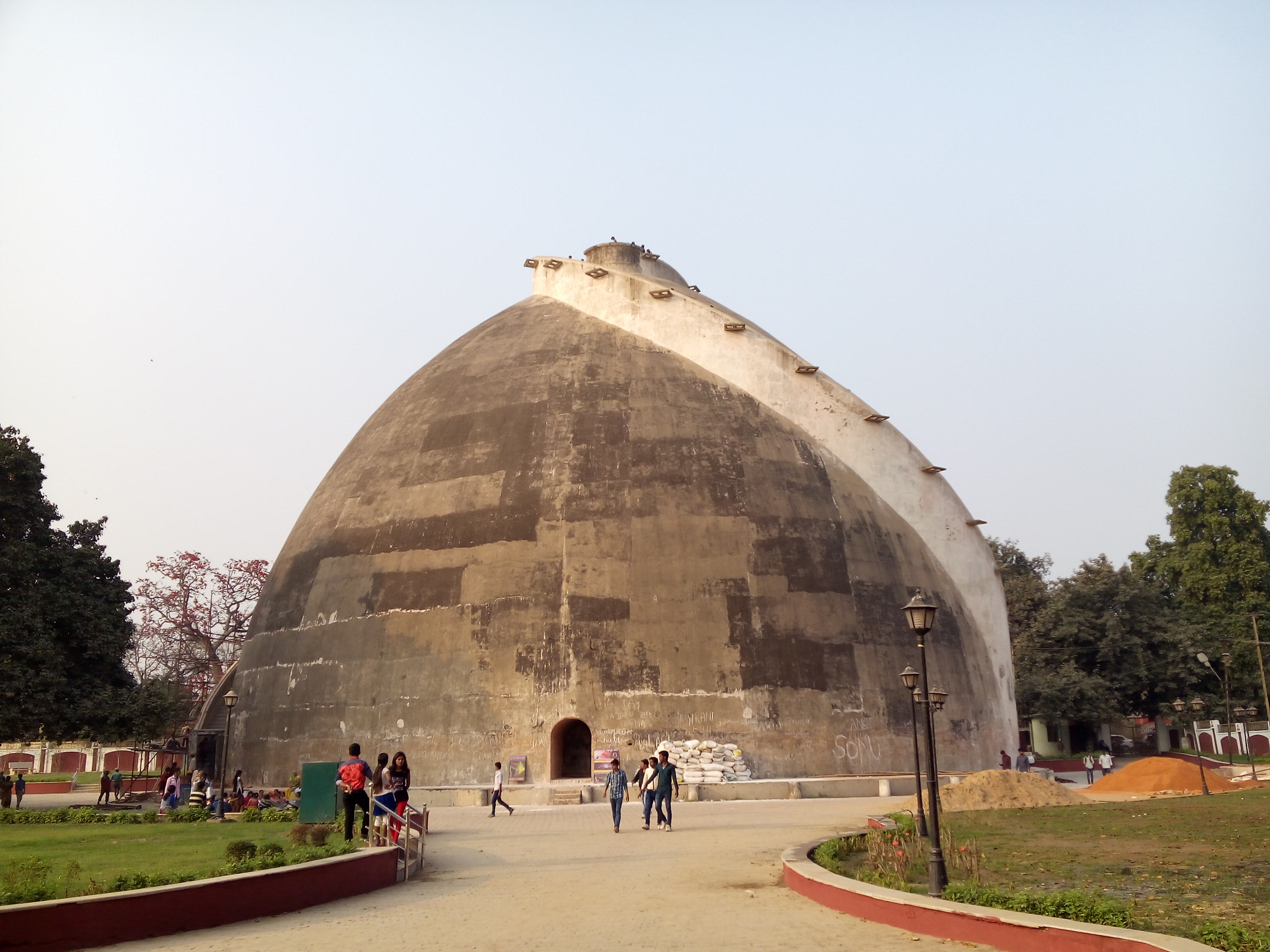
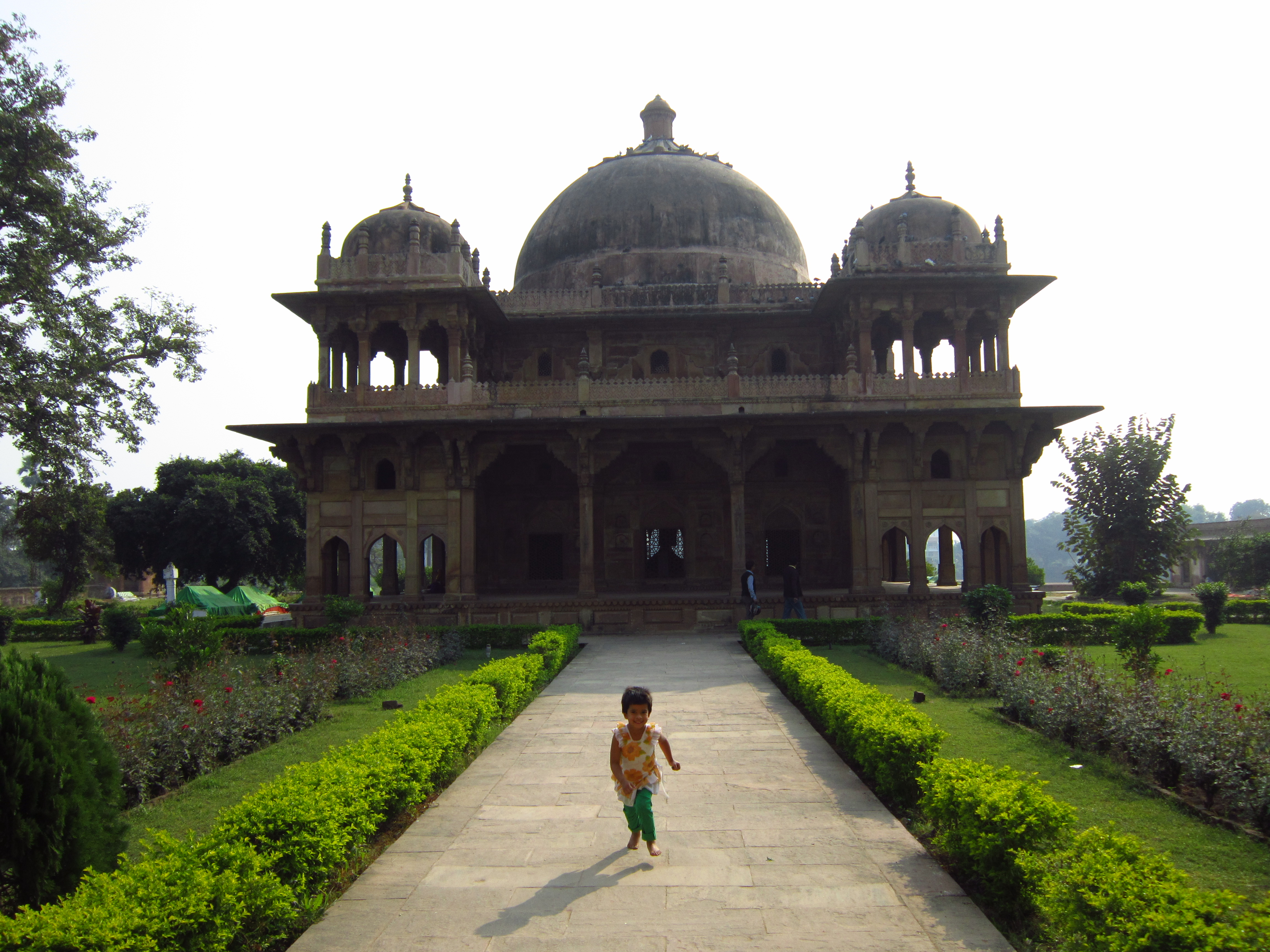
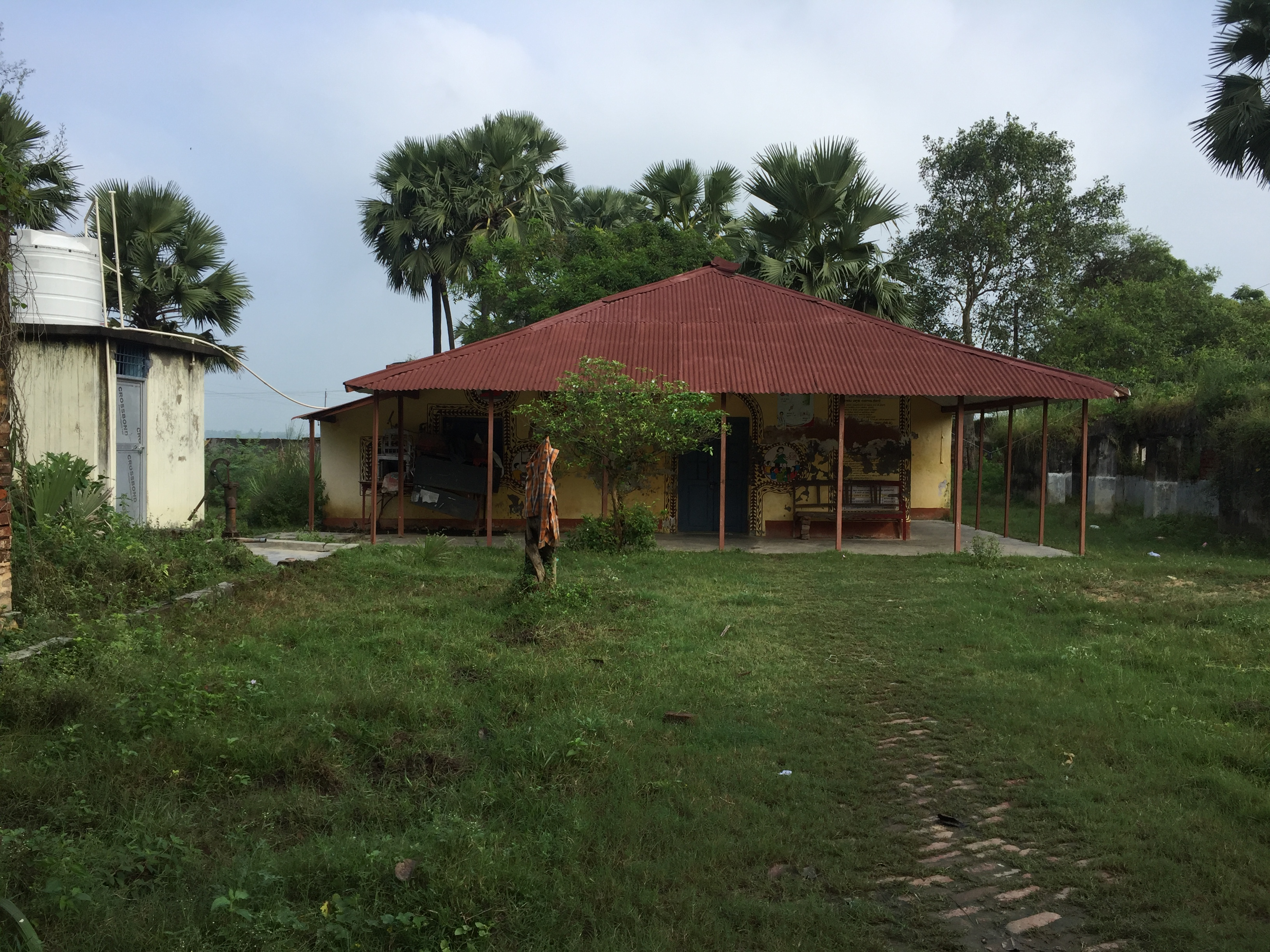
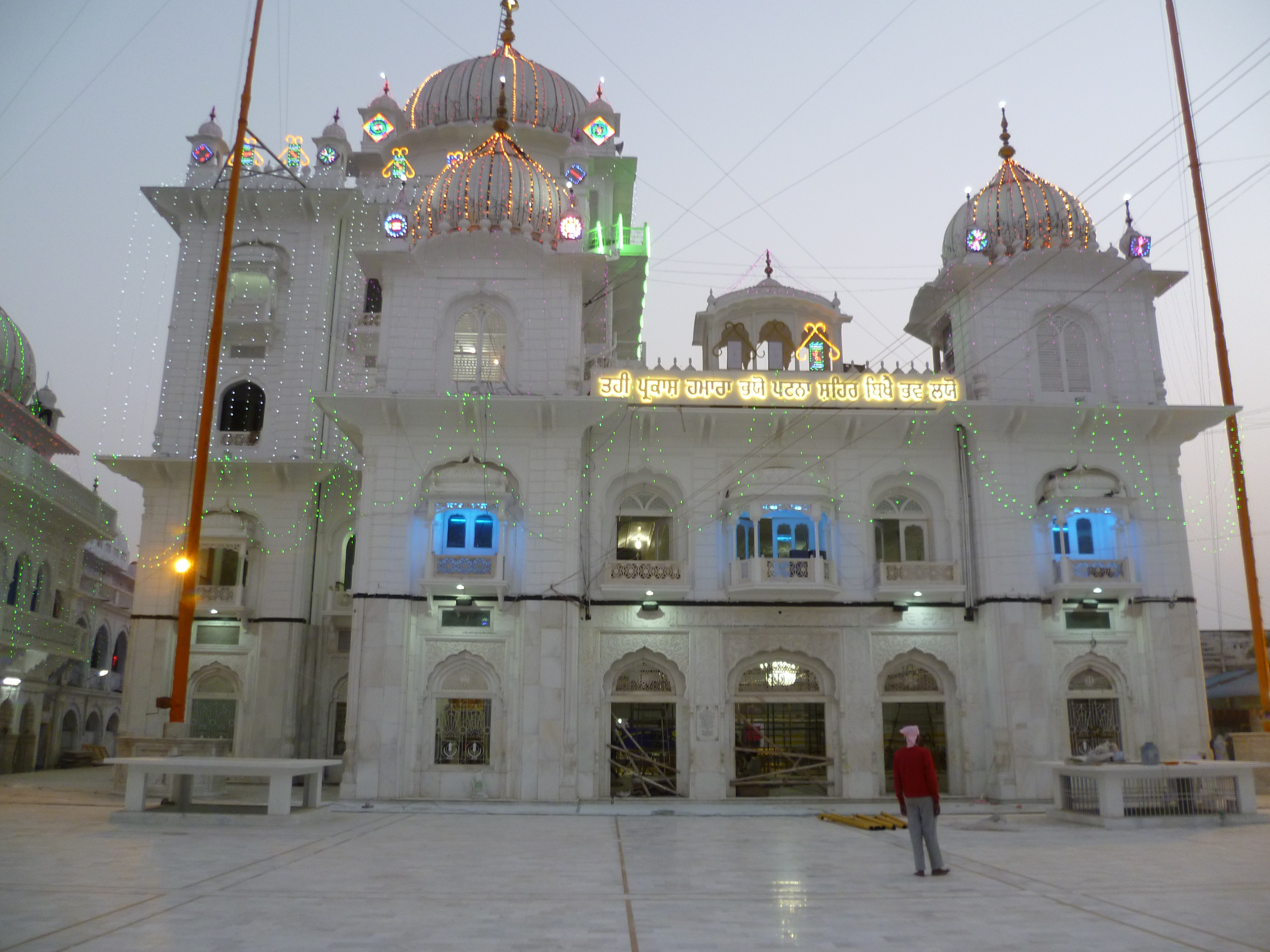
- Clockwise from top-left: Golghar, Tomb of Shah Makhdum Daulat Maneri and Ibrahim Khan, Gurudwara Patna Sahib, Digha–Sonpur Bridge, Rajkiya Hospital in Bharatpur

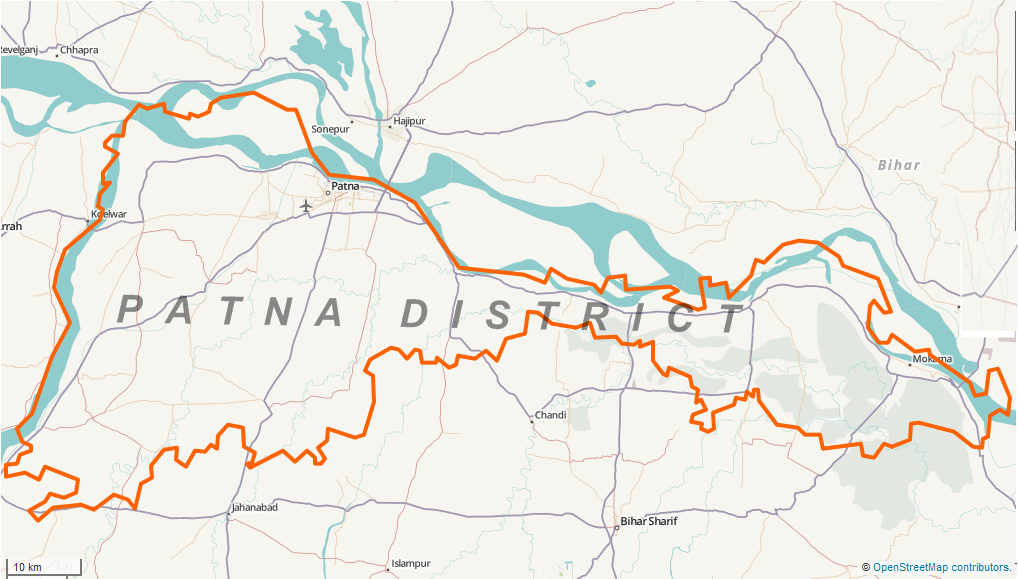

- Coordinates (Patna): 25°25′N 85°10′E
- Country: India
- State: Bihar
- Region: Magadh
- Division: Patna
- Headquarters: Patna

Government
  - Lok Sabha constituencies: 1. Pataliputra, 2. Patna sahib, 3. Munger (shared with Munger district)
  - Vidhan Sabha constituencies: 14

Area
  - Total: 3,202 km^{2} (1,236 sq mi)

Population (2011)
  - Total: 5,838,465
  - Rank: (IN: 15th)
  - Density: 1,823/km^{2} (4,723/sq mi)
  - Urban: 2,514,590

Demographics
  - Literacy (2011): 70.68%
  - Sex ratio: 1.897 ♂/♀
- Time zone: UTC+05:30 (IST)
- Major highways: NH 30, NH 83
- HDI (2016): ▲0.811 (high)
- GDP (District) (2023): US$30 (equivalent to $33.01 in 2025)Billion
- Website: patna.nic.in

Patna district is one of the thirty-eight districts of Bihar state in eastern India. Patna, the capital of Bihar, is the district headquarters. The Patna district is a part of the Patna division. The Patna district is divided into 6 Subdivisions (Tehsils) i.e. Patna Sadar, Patna City, Barh, Masaurhi, Danapur and Paliganj.

As of 2011, it is the most populous district of Bihar and the fifteenth most populous district in India.

The revenue district of Patna comes under the jurisdiction of a District Collector (District Magistrate). The office of the Patna DM is in the Patna Collectorate.

== History ==
Patna is one of the oldest continuously inhabited places in the world. Patna was founded in 490 BCE by the king of Magadha Ajatashatru. Ancient Patna, known as Pataliputra, was the capital of the Magadha Empire under the Haryanka, Nanda, Mauryan, Shunga, Gupta and Pala empires. Pataliputra was a seat of learning and fine arts. Patliputra was home to many mathematicians, astronomers, astrologists and scholars including Gautam Buddha, Aryabhata, Panini, Vātsyāyana, Chanakya and Kālidāsa. Its population during the Maurya period (around 400 BCE) was about 400,000. Patna served as the seat of power, political and cultural centre of the Indian subcontinent. With the fall of the Gupta Empire, Patna lost its glory. It was revived again in the 17th century by the British as a centre of international trade.

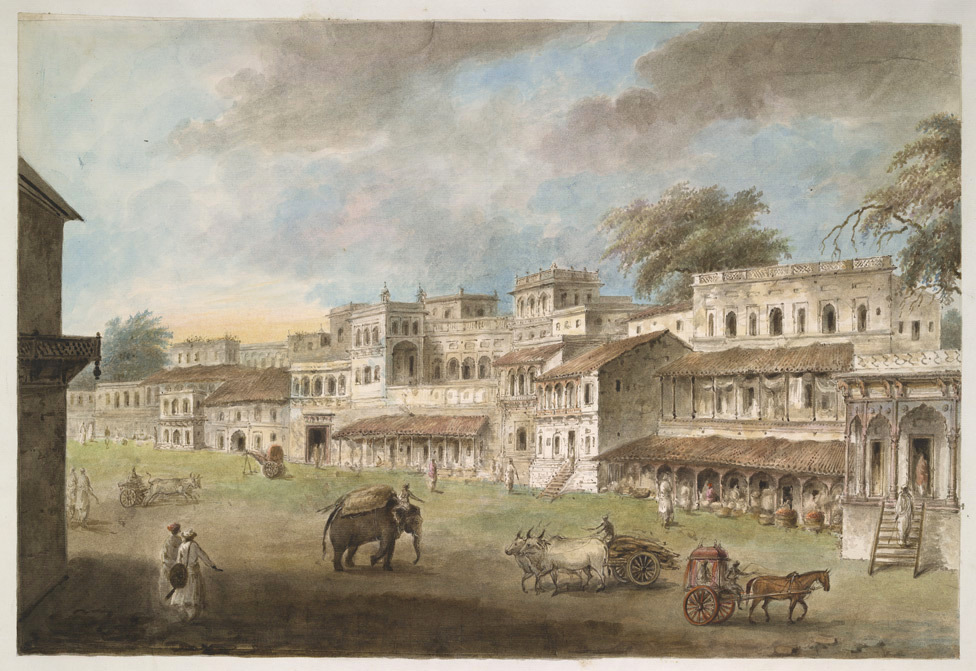
Main street of Patna, showing one side of the Chowk, 1814–15.

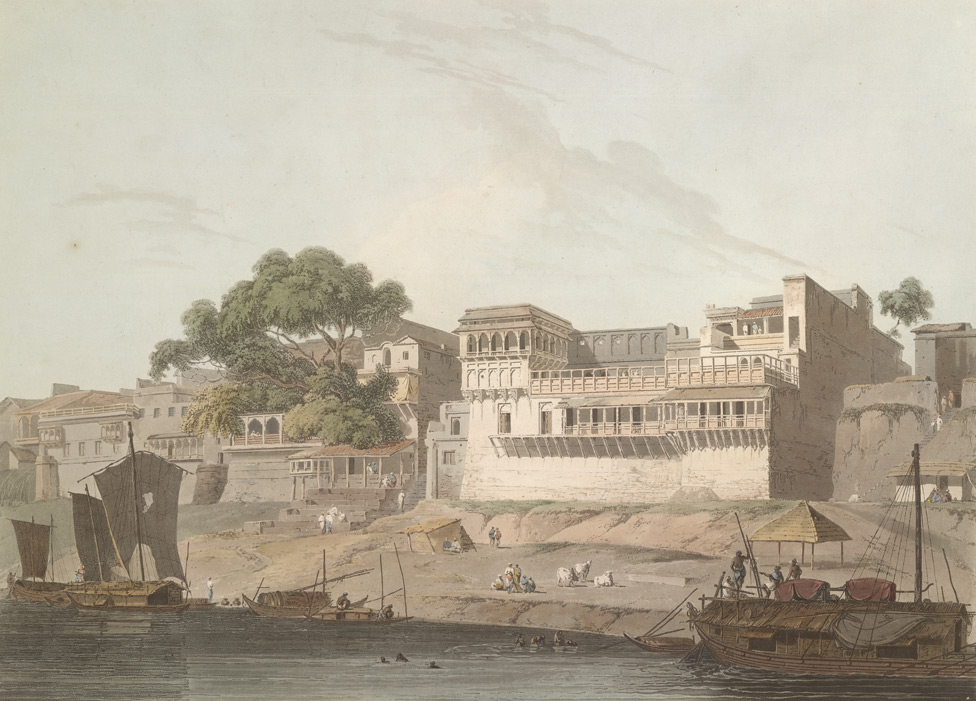
City of Patna, on the River Ganges, 19th-century painting.

=== Modern history ===
The modern district of Patna was created in September 1770 as a provincial council by the British, to supervise revenue matters of Bihar. In 1793, Patna became a separate judicial district. This led to the foundation of the modern district.

The reorganisation of the districts in the State took effect in 1972. On 9 November 1972, Nalanda district was constituted by carving out the Bihar Sharif sub-division of Patna district.

== Geography ==
Patna district occupies an area of 3,202 square kilometres (1,236 sq mi), bounded by the Son River to the west, and the Ganges to the north. In the south, it is bordered by the Nalanda, Arwal, by Jehanabad districts, in the east by Begusarai district, and by Lakhisarai to the southeast.

== Administration ==
The Patna district is headed by an IAS officer of the rank of District Magistrate (DM). The district is divided into sub-divisions or Tehsils, each headed by a Sub Divisional Magistrate (SDM).

These Tehsils are further divided into Blocks, each headed by a Block development officer (BDO).

=== Tehsils ===
The six subdivisions or Tehsils in Patna district are as follows:

1. Patna Sadar
2. Patna City
3. Barh
4. Masaurhi
5. Danapur
6. Paliganj

=== Blocks ===
The 23 Blocks under 6 Tehsils in Patna district are as follows:

Tehsil (Sub-division)	CD Blocks
Patna Sadar	Patna Sadar, Sampatchak and Phulwari Sharif
Patna City	Fatuha, Daniyawaan and Khusrupur
Barh	Athmalgola, Mokama, Belchi, Ghoswari, Pandarak, Bakhtiyarpur and Barh
Masaurhi	Masaurhi, Punpun and Dhanarua
Danapur	Danapur, Maner, Bihta and Naubatpur
Paliganj	Paliganj, Dulhin Bazar and Bikram

== Industries ==
In Patna district the most Industries are located in Fatuha to DidarGanj.

== Demographics ==
Historical population
Year	Pop.	±% p.a.
1901	1,028,073	—
1911	1,018,226	−0.10%
1921	998,101	−0.20%
1931	1,168,744	+1.59%
1941	1,357,416	+1.51%
1951	1,600,295	+1.66%
1961	1,861,811	+1.53%
1971	2,250,883	+1.92%
1981	3,019,201	+2.98%
1991	3,618,211	+1.83%
2001	4,718,592	+2.69%
2011	5,838,465	+2.15%

Religions in Patna district (2011)
Religion	Percent
Hinduism	91.74%
Islam	7.54%
Other or not stated	0.72%

According to the 2011 census, Patna is the 15th most populous district, with a population of 5,838,465, roughly equal to the nation of Nicaragua or the US state of Maryland. The district has a population density of 1,823 inhabitants per square kilometre (4,720/sq mi). Its population growth rate over the decade 2001–2011 was 22.34%. Patna has a sex ratio of 897 females for every 1,000 males and a literacy rate of 70.68%. 43.07% of the population lives in urban areas. Scheduled Castes and Scheduled Tribes make up 15.77% and 0.15% of the population respectively.

Languages in Patna district (2011)
1. Magahi (46.4%)
2. Hindi (43.8%)
3. Urdu (5.19%)
4. Bhojpuri (2.67%)
5. Maithili (1.24%)
6. Others (0.78%)

At the time of the 2011 Census of India, 46.35% of the population in the district spoke Magahi, 43.77% Hindi, 5.19% Urdu, 2.67% Bhojpuri and 1.24% Maithili as their first language.

== Climate ==
Climate data for Patna
Month	Jan	Feb	Mar	Apr	May	Jun	Jul	Aug	Sep	Oct	Nov	Dec	Year
Mean daily maximum °C (°F)	23.3 (73.9)	26.5 (79.7)	32.6 (90.7)	37.7 (99.9)	38.9 (102.0)	36.7 (98.1)	33.0 (91.4)	32.4 (90.3)	32.3 (90.1)	31.5 (88.7)	28.8 (83.8)	24.7 (76.5)	31.53 (88.75)
Mean daily minimum °C (°F)	9.2 (48.6)	11.6 (52.9)	16.4 (61.5)	22.3 (72.1)	25.2 (77.4)	26.7 (80.1)	26.2 (79.2)	26.2 (79.2)	25.7 (78.3)	21.8 (71.2)	14.7 (58.5)	9.9 (49.8)	19.65 (67.37)
Average precipitation mm (inches)	19 (0.7)	11 (0.4)	11 (0.4)	8 (0.3)	33 (1.3)	134 (5.3)	306 (12.0)	274 (10.8)	227 (8.9)	94 (3.7)	9 (0.4)	4 (0.2)	1,130 (44.5)
Source: worldweather.org

== Economy ==
In 2006 the Ministry of Panchayati Raj named Patna one of the country's 250 most backward districts. It is one of the 38 districts in Bihar currently receiving funds from the Backward Regions Grant Fund.

Agricultural products include paddy, maize, pulses, wheat, and oilseeds. Roughly one-third of the area sown is under rice (paddy). Cash crops such as vegetables and watermelons are also grown in the Diara belt. Major industries include leather, handicrafts, and agro-processing.

== Politics ==
District	No.	Constituency	Name	Party	Alliance	Remarks
Patna	178	Mokama	Anant Kumar Singh	JD(U)	NDA	
Patna	179	Barh	Siyaram Singh	BJP	NDA	
Patna	180	Bakhtiarpur	Arun Kumar	LJP(RV)	NDA	
Patna	181	Digha	Sanjiv Chaurasiya	BJP	NDA	
Patna	182	Bankipur	Nitin Nabin	BJP	NDA	Resigned on 30 March 2026
Patna	182	Bankipur	Prashant Kishor	JSP	None	Elected on 3 August 2026
Patna	183	Kumhrar	Sanjay Kumar	BJP	NDA	
Patna	184	Patna Sahib	Ratnesh Kumar Kushwaha	BJP	NDA	
Patna	185	Fatuha	Rama Nand Yadav	RJD	MGB	
Patna	186	Danapur	Ram Kripal Yadav	BJP	NDA	Minister
Patna	187	Maner	Virendra Yadav	RJD	MGB	
Patna	188	Phulwari (SC)	Shyam Rajak	JD(U)	NDA	
Patna	189	Masaurhi (SC)	Arun Manjhi	JD(U)	NDA	
Patna	190	Paliganj	Sandeep Yadav	CPI(ML)L	MGB	
Patna	191	Bikram	Siddharth Saurav	BJP	NDA	

=== Assembly ===
The district is divided into fourteen assembly constituencies:

- 178 Mokama
- 179 Barh
- 180 Bakhtiarpur
- 181 Digha
- 182 Bankipur
- 183 Kumhrar
- 184 Patna Sahib
- 185 Fatuha
- 186 Danapur
- 187 Maner
- 188 Phulwari (SC)
- 189 Masaurhi (SC)
- 190 Paliganj
- 191 Bikram

=== Parliamentary ===
The district has three parliament constituencies:

- 30 Patna Sahib (Lok Sabha constituency), covers Bakhtiarpur, Digha, Bankipur, Kumhrar, Patna Sahib and Fatuha.
- 31 Pataliputra (Lok Sabha constituency), covers Danapur, Maner, Phulwari, Masaurhi, Paliganj, and Bikram.
- 28 Munger/Monghyr (Lok Sabha constituency), covers Barh and Mokama and shared with Munger district.

-Numbers denote constituency number.

== Education ==
Schools in Patna are either government-run schools or private schools. Schools mainly use Hindi or English as the medium of instruction. Under the 10+2+3/4 plan, after completing their secondary education, students typically enroll in a school with a higher secondary facility affiliated with the Bihar School Examination Board, the Central Board of Secondary Education, the National Institute of Open Schooling, or the Council for the Indian School Certificate Examinations.

== Notable people ==
=== CM of Bihar ===
- Krishna Ballabh Sahay, Former Chief Minister of Bihar
- Mahamaya Prasad Sinha, Former Chief Minister of Bihar, Former MP Patna

=== MP of Patna ===
- Sarangdhar Sinha Former MP of Patna
- Ramavatar Shastri Former MP of Patna

=== Central Cabinet Minister ===
- Yashwant Sinha, former finance minister of India
- Rita Verma, former Minister of State of Mines and Minerals in the Indian government
- Ravi Shankar Prasad, Ex-Cabinet Minister in Narendra Modi Ministry, Member of Parliament, Patna Sahib
- Shatrughan Sinha, Member of Parliament,Asansol, Ex-Member of Parliament Patna Sahib, Former Cabinet Minister in Third Vajpayee Ministry

=== Bihar Cabinet Minister ===
- Nitin Nabin, Cabinet Minister in Ninth Nitish ministry

=== MLA in Patna ===
- Arun Kumar Sinha, MLA Kumhrar

== List of villages ==
The Patna district has 1,395 villages and 322 Gram Panchayats under all 23 Blocks. The list of villages in Patna Sadar Block is as follows:

- Alipur ullar
- Digha East
- Digha West
- Fatehpur
- Mahuli
- Mainpura East
- Mainpura North
- Mainpura West
- Marchi
- Nakta Diyara
- Punadih
- Sabalpur
- Sonawapur

== See also ==
- Patna Police
- Patna Metropolitan Region
