= Malti (given name) =

Malti is an Indian feminine given name. Notable people with the name include:

- Malti Devi (1968–1999), Indian politician
- Malti Joshi (1934–2024), Indian novelist, essayist, and writer
- Malti Sharma (1930–2018), Indian politician
