= Sukhdeo Prasad Verma =

Indian politician (1916–1991)

Member of Parliament, Lok Sabha
- In office 1977-1980
- Preceded by: Shankar Dayal Singh
- Succeeded by: Ranjit Singh
- Constituency: Chatra, Bihar
- In office 1971-1977
- Preceded by: Surya Prakash Puri
- Succeeded by: Nathuni Ram
- Constituency: Nawada, Bihar

Member of Bihar Legislative Assembly
- In office 1962–1967
- Constituency: Makhdumpur Assembly constituency

Member of Bihar Legislative Assembly
- In office 1957–1962
- Constituency: Tikari Assembly constituency

Personal details
- Born: 10 April 1916
- Died: 5 February 1991 (aged 74)
- Party: Janata Party
- Other political affiliations: Indian National Congress
- Children: Krishna Nandan Prasad Verma

Sukhdeo Prasad Verma (10 April 1916 – 5 February 1991) was an Indian politician. He was elected to the lower House of the Indian Parliament, the Lok Sabha, from Nawada, Bihar and Chatra, Bihar.

== Life ==
Verma was born on 10 April 1916 in Sugaon, a locality within Makhdumpur block of the Jahanabad district of Bihar to Gopal Prasad Verma. He was a member of the Koeri community. In 1935, he developed a keen interest in the Indian independence movement and became an active member of the Indian National Congress. Soon, he left his teaching position and attended the famous Ramgarh Session of Indian National Congress in 1940. In 1942, he played a pivotal role in organising the Quit India movement in Gaya district. Due to his activities, orders were issued by British authorities for his arrest. During this period, he continued his activism while remaining underground. After the end of movement, he was made a member of State Congress Committee and soon elevated to the position of a member of the All India Congress Committee. After Indian independence, he continued his participation in active politics and, in 1969, was appointed as president of Indian National Congress for the integrated Gaya district.

Verma was later elected to Lok Sabha (the Indian Parliament) twice from Nawada Lok Sabha constituency and later from Chatra Lok Sabha constituency. He also served as a minister in Government of Bihar.

Verma died on 5 February 1991. His son Krishna Nandan Prasad Verma is also a politician and Janata Dal (United) leader, who has served as Minister for Education in the Government of Bihar.
