= Kameshwar Paswan =

Indian politician

Member of Parliament, Lok Sabha
- In office 1996–1998
- Preceded by: Prem Chand Ram
- Succeeded by: Malti Devi
- Constituency: Nawada

Member of Parliament, Rajya Sabha
- In office 10 April 1990 – 9 April 1996
- Succeeded by: Shatrughan Sinha
- Constituency: Bihar

Member of Bihar Legislative Assembly
- In office 1972–1980
- Preceded by: Kauleshwar Das
- Succeeded by: Punit Rai
- Constituency: Fatuha

Personal details
- Born: Kameshwar Paswan; 15 January 1941 Fatuha, Patna
- Died: 28 May 2018 (aged 77) Patna, Bihar
- Political party: Bharatiya Janata Party
- Spouse: Singhasani Devi (m. 1962)
- Children: 1 Son & 2 Daughter's
- Education: M. A.

Kameshwar Paswan (1941–2018) was a politician from Bihar state of India and was a leader of Bharatiya Janata Party. He was a former state minister and a former member of Rajya Sabha and Lok Sabha. He was elected to Bihar Legislative Assembly first time in 1972 as a candidate of Bharatiya Jan Sangh . Later in 1977 he was again elected to the assembly and served as minister for welfare in Government of Bihar until 1979. Paswan got elected to Rajya Sabha in 1990 and served as its member until 1996. In the same year he was elected to Lok Sabha from Nawada.

He studied MA from Ramdayalu Singh College and Langat Singh College in Muzaffarpur. He was a teacher by profession.

Paswan took part in Bihar movement launched by Jayaprakash Narayan and was arrested by then Congress government in the emergency in 1976 and kept in jail for 19 months.
