= 2017 Patna boat accident =

Boat capsizing incident in India

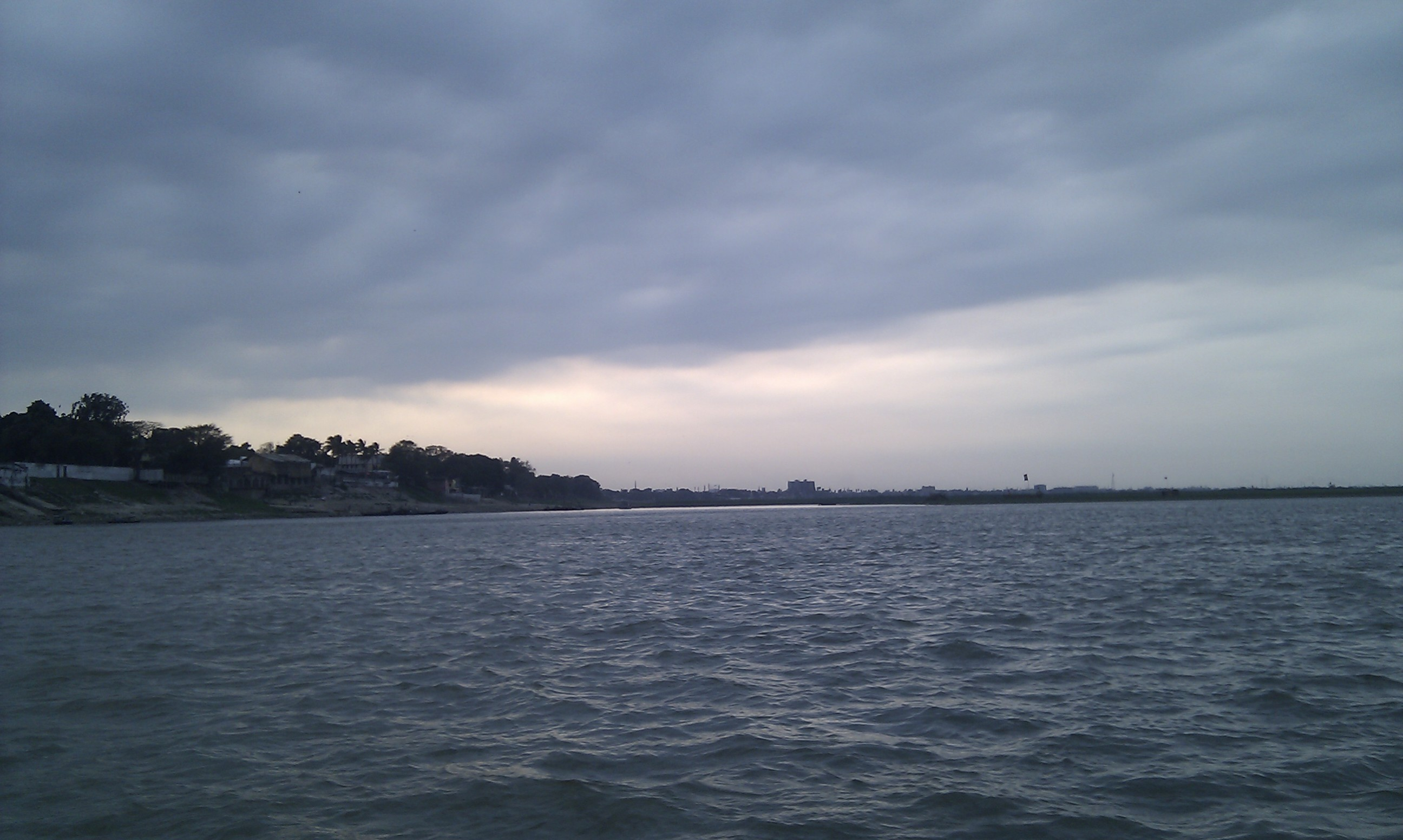
- River Ganges in Patna
- Date: 14 January 2017
- Time: Around 18:00 (IST)
- Location: Ganges, Patna, Bihar State, India
- Cause: Overcrowding
- Participants: 40+
- Deaths: 25

On 14 January 2017, a boat carrying more than 40 passengers capsized in the Ganges in the Indian city of Patna, Bihar, killing 25 people. The boat was about to reach the bank when it capsized. Overloading is suspected to be the cause of the accident.

== Incident ==
The boat was returning from a kite-flying festival on an island called Ganga Diyara in the middle of the Ganges, as part of the Makar Sankranti celebration in the city of Patna. The small boat, which was overloaded with passengers, was about to reach the bank when it capsized. The boat's capacity was 30 people, but estimates from local officials placed its actual load at 40 to 50.

== Rescue operation ==
Rescue operations located 19 bodies on 14 January, and five more on 15 January before they ended once, according to local police, there were no more outstanding missing persons. Nine people were retrieved from the river by rescuers, while about a dozen swam to shore. Eight people were hospitalized at the Patna Medical College and Hospital(PMCH)

== Relief ==
The Prime Minister of India, Narendra Modi, announced an ex gratia payment from the Prime Minister National Relief Fund of ₹2 lakh for the next of kin of those who died in the boat accident and ₹50 thousand for those seriously injured. Bihar Chief Minister Nitish Kumar also announced that compensation of ₹4 lakh will be given to relatives of each of the dead.
