= Ram Dhani Das =

Indian politician

Ram Dhani Das (17 January 1925 — 12 June 2000) was an Indian politician who was a member of the First to Fourth Lok Sabhas from 1952 to 1970, representing Nawada and Gaya Parliamentary Constituencies of Bihar.

== Early life and political career ==
Das was born in Sabalpur in January 1925. He participated in Quit India Movement in 1942, for which he was imprisoned.

He worked relentlessly for the upliftment of the Scheduled Castes and other backward sections of the society and was a Member of Provisional Parliament from 1950 to 1952. He died in Patna in June 2000 at the age of 75.
