= Patna Lok Sabha constituency =

Lok Sabha constituency in Bihar, India

Coordinates: 25.6°N 85.1°E

Patna
- Former Lok Sabha constituency

Constituency details
- Country: India
- Region: East India
- State: Bihar
- Established: 1957
- Abolished: 2008

Patna was a Lok Sabha constituency which existed from 1957 to 2008 in Bihar, India. Later in 2008 it was split into two seats: Pataliputra and Patna Sahib.

== About ==
During the 1st Lok Sabha (1952-1957), Patna region had 4 Lok Sabha constituencies namely: Pataliputra, Patna Central, Patna East and Patna-cum-Shahabad (Arrah).

During the 2nd Lok Sabha in 1957, all 4 constituencies were renamed as follows:

No.	From	To
1.	Pataliputra	Patna Lok Sabha
2.	Patna Central	Nalanda
3.	Patna East	Barh
4.	Patna-cum-Shahabad	Shahabad (Arrah)

== Members of Parliament ==
=== 1952-1957 ===
In the 1st Lok Sabha (1952-1957), Patna region had 4 Lok Sabha constituencies:

- Pataliputra (Patna) : Sarangdhar Sinha, INC
- Patna Central : Kailash Pati Sinha, INC
- Patna East : Tarkeshwari Sinha, INC
- Patna-cum-Shahabad : Bali Ram Bhagat, INC

=== 1957-2008 ===
As Patna Lok Sabha constituency from 2nd to 14th Lok Sabha.

Year	Name	Party
1957	Sarangdhar Sinha	Indian National Congress
1962	Ram Dulari Sinha	Indian National Congress
1967	Ramavatar Shastri	Communist Party of India
1971	Ramavatar Shastri	Communist Party of India
1977	Mahamaya Prasad Sinha	Janata Party
1980	Ramavatar Shastri	Communist Party of India
1984	C. P. Thakur	Indian National Congress
1989	Shailendra Nath Shrivastava	Bharatiya Janata Party
1991	Election countermanded due to violence	
1993^	Ram Kripal Yadav	Janata Dal
1996	Ram Kripal Yadav	Janata Dal
1998	Election countermanded due to violence	
1998^	C. P. Thakur	Bharatiya Janata Party
1999	C. P. Thakur	Bharatiya Janata Party
2004	Ram Kripal Yadav	Rashtriya Janata Dal
From 2008 : See Patna Sahib & Pataliputra

^By-Poll

=== 2008-Present ===
From the 15th Lok Sabha (2009) onwards, the Patna Lok Sabha constituency has been bifurcated into 2 constituencies: Pataliputra and Patna Sahib.

== Election results ==
=== 2004 ===
2004 Indian general election: Patna
Party	Candidate	Votes	%	±%
RJD	Ram Kripal Yadav	4,33,853	48.12	
BJP	C. P. Thakur	3,95,291	43.84	
Majority		38,562	4.28	
Turnout		9,01,558		
RJD gain from BJP		Swing		

=== 1999 ===
1999 Indian general election: Patna
Party	Candidate	Votes	%	±%
BJP	C. P. Thakur	3,79,370	47.3	
RJD	Ram Kripal Yadav	3,32,478	41.45	
Majority		46,892	5.85	
Turnout		8,12,307		
BJP hold		Swing		

=== 1998 Re-election ===
1998 Patna Re-election: Patna
Party	Candidate	Votes	%	±%
BJP	C. P. Thakur	3,31,860	51.55	
RJD	Ram Kripal Yadav	2,79,254	43.38	
Majority		52,606	8.17	
Turnout		6,54,670		
BJP gain from JD		Swing		

=== 1998 ===
The 1998 Lok Sabha election in Patna was countermanded due to reports of massive vote rigging.

=== 1996 ===
1996 Indian general election: Patna
Party	Candidate	Votes	%	±%
JD	Ram Kripal Yadav	3,88,513	50.18	
BJP	S. N. Arya	3,49,046	45.08	
Majority		39,467	5.1	
Turnout		7,81,874		
JD hold		Swing		

=== 1993 Re-election ===
1993 Patna Re-election: Patna
Party	Candidate	Votes	%	±%
JD	Ram Kripal Yadav	3,39,563	53.43	
BJP	Shailendra Nath Shrivastava	1,79,620	28.26	
Majority		1,59,943	25.17	
Turnout		6,35,422		
JD gain from BJP		Swing		

=== 1991 ===
The 1991 Lok Sabha election in Patna was countermanded due to reports of massive vote rigging. Janata Dal fielded Inder Kumar Gujral from here, and Janata Party fielded Yashwant Sinha.

=== 1989 ===
1989 Indian general election: Patna
Party	Candidate	Votes	%	±%
BJP	Shailendra Nath Shrivastava	1,87,666	30.2	
INC	Chandreshwar Prasad Thakur	1,66,073	26.73	
CPI	Ram Nath Yadav	1,55,224	24.98	
Majority		21,593	3.47	
Turnout		6,43,303		
BJP gain from INC		Swing		

=== 1984 ===
1984 Indian general election: Patna
Party	Candidate	Votes	%	±%
INC	Chandreshwar Prasad Thakur	2,14,909	43.37	
CPI	Ramavatar Shastri	1,42,808	28.81	
Independent	S. K. Sinha	1,17,537	23.28	
Majority		72,181	14.56	
Turnout		5,04,781		
INC gain from CPI		Swing		

=== 1980 ===
- Ramavatar Shastri (CPI) : 167,290
- Mahamaya Prasad Sinha (JP) : 146,877

=== 1977 ===
- Mahamaya Prasad Sinha (JP) : 382,363
- Ramavatar Shastri (CPI) : 59,238

=== 1971 ===
- Ramavatar Shastri (CPI) : 191,911
- Kailashpati Mishra (BJS) : 114,485

=== 1967 ===
- Ramavatar Shastri (CPI) : 148,963
- Ram Dulari Sinha (INC) : 66,822

=== 1962 ===
- Ram Dulari Sinha (INC) : 101,687
- Ramavatar Shastri (CPI) : 76,605

=== 1957 ===
- Sarangdhar Sinha (INC) : 75,618
- Ramavatar Shastri (CPI) : 66,936

== See also ==
- List of constituencies of the Lok Sabha
- Patna Sahib (Lok Sabha constituency)
- Pataliputra (Lok Sabha constituency)
