= Prem Chand Ram =

Indian politician

Member of Parliament, Lok Sabha
- In office 1991–1996
- Preceded by: Prem Pradeep
- Succeeded by: Kameshwar Paswan
- Constituency: Nawada, Bihar

Personal details
- Party: Communist Party of India (Marxist)
- Spouse: Parwati Devi

Prem Chand Ram is an Indian politician. He was elected to the lower House of the Indian Parliament the Lok Sabha from Nawada, Bihar as a member of the Communist Party of India (Marxist).
