= Kirdaar =

- Written by: Gulzar; Samaresh Basu; Malti Joshi; Ahmed Nadeem Qasmi
- Directed by: Gulzar
- Starring: Om Puri
- Opening theme: "Kirdaar" by Jagjit Singh
- Composer: Jagjit Singh
- Country of origin: India
- Original languages: Hindi; Urdu
- No. of seasons: 1
- No. of episodes: 13

Production
- Running time: 22–24 minutes

Original release
- Network: DD National
- Release: 31 October 1993 – 23 January 1994

Kirdaar is an Indian television series aired on DD National directed by Gulzar. It ran between 1993 and 1994, based on short stories written by different writers in different languages, mainly Urdu, Hindi and Bengali writers. The short stories were featured from writers like Ahmed Nadeem Qasmi, Malti Joshi and Samaresh Basu. It starred Om Puri playing various characters in all the episodes and different actors in each episode like Surekha Sikri, Irrfan Khan, Reema Lagoo and Neena Gupta.

== Cast ==
- Om Puri
- Surekha Sikri
- Ananya Khare (credited as Priti Khare)
- Sadiya Siddiqui
- Bhupendra
- Nadira
- Irrfan Khan
- Neena Gupta
- Mita Vashisht
- Reema Lagoo
- Shahib Abbas
- Mita Vashisht

== Episodes ==
- Alaan - Written by Ahmed Nadeem Qasmi
- Hisaab Kitaab - Written by Gulzar
- Haath Peele Kar Do - Written by Gulzar
- Khuda Hafiz - Written by Samaresh Basu
- Bel Nimbu - Written by Manoj Basu
- Culture - Written by Malti Joshi
- Sunset Boulevard Part 1 - Written by Gulzar
- Sunset Boulevard Part 2 - Written by Gulzar
- Mann Dhuan Dhuan - Written by Malti Joshi
- Mukhbir - Written by Ahmed Nadeem Qasmi
- Rehman ki Jutti - Written by Rajinder Singh Bedi
- Shikod - Written by Prafulla Roy
- Baba Noor - Written by Ahmed Nadeem Qasmi
