= Nawada Lok Sabha constituency =

Lok Sabha Constituency in Bihar

Coordinates: 24.89°N 85.54°E

Nawada
- Lok Sabha constituency

Constituency details
- Country: India
- Region: East India
- State: Bihar
- Assembly constituencies: Barbigha; Rajauli; Hisua; Nawada; Gobindpur; Warisaliganj
- Established: 1952
- Reservation: None

Member of Parliament
- 18th Lok Sabha
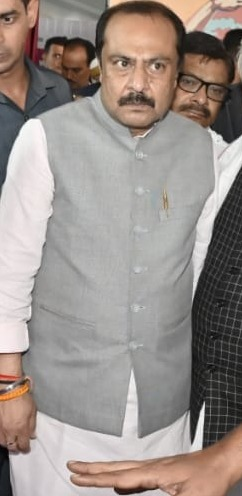
- Incumbent Vivek Thakur; S/O: Chandreshwar Prasad Thakur
- Party: BJP
- Alliance: NDA
- Elected year: 2024
- Preceded by: Chandan Singh; RLJP

Nawada is one of the 40 Lok Sabha (parliamentary) constituencies in Bihar in India.

== Assembly segments ==
Presently, Nawada Lok Sabha constituency comprises the following six Vidhan Sabha (legislative assembly) segments:

#	Name	District	Member	Party	2024 lead
170	Barbigha	Sheikhpura	Kumar Puspanjay	JD(U)	BJP
235	Rajauli (SC)	Nawada	Vimal Rajbanshi	LJP(RV)	BJP
236	Hisua	Nawada	Anil Singh	BJP	BJP
237	Nawada	Nawada	Vibha Devi Yadav	JD(U)	BJP
238	Gobindpur	Nawada	Binita Mehta	LJP(RV)	RJD
239	Warisaliganj	Nawada	Anita Mahto	RJD	BJP

== Members of Parliament ==
The following is the list of the Members of Parliament elected from this Lok Sabha constituency:

Year	Name	Party
1952	Brajeshwar Prasad	Indian National Congress
1952	Ram Dhani Das	Indian National Congress
1957	Satyabhama Devi	Indian National Congress
1957	Ram Dhani Das	Indian National Congress
1962	Ram Dhani Das	Indian National Congress
1967	Surya Prakash Puri	Independent
1971	Sukhdeo Prasad Verma	Indian National Congress
1977	Nathuni Ram	Janata Party
1980	Kunwar Ram	Indian National Congress
1984	Kunwar Ram	Indian National Congress
1989	Prem Pradeep	Communist Party of India
1991	Prem Chand Ram	Communist Party of India
1996	Kameshwar Paswan	Bharatiya Janata Party
1998	Malti Devi	Rashtriya Janata Dal
1999	Sanjay Paswan	Bharatiya Janata Party
2004	Virchandra Paswan	Rashtriya Janata Dal
2009	Bhola Singh	Bharatiya Janata Party
2014	Giriraj Singh	Bharatiya Janata Party
2019	Chandan Singh	Lok Janshakti Party
2024	Vivek Thakur	Bharatiya Janata Party

== Election Results ==
=== 2024 ===
2024 Indian general elections: Nawada
Party	Candidate	Votes	%	±%
BJP	Vivek Thakur	410,608	47.2	
RJD	Shravan Kushwaha	3,42,938	39.42	
NOTA	None of the Above	12,592		
BSP	Ranjit Kumar	16,316		
Independent	Binod Yadav	39,519	4.54	
Independent	Gunjan Kumar	29,682	3.41	
Majority		67,670		
Turnout		8,71,838	43.37	−6.46
BJP gain from LJP		Swing		

=== 2019 ===
2019 Indian general elections: Nawada
Party	Candidate	Votes	%	±%
LJP	Chandan Singh	495,684	52.59	N/A
RJD	Vibha Devi	3,47,612	36.88	+8.6%
NOTA	None of the Above	35,147	3.73	+2.88%
Majority		1,48,072	15.71	
Turnout		9,44,691	49.73	−2.45%
LJP gain from BJP		Swing		

=== 2014 ===
2014 Indian general elections: Nawada
Party	Candidate	Votes	%	±%
BJP	Giriraj Singh	3,90,248	44.12	+21.66
RJD	Raj Ballabh Prasad	2,50,091	28.28	N/A
JD(U)	Kaushal Yadav	1,68,217	19.02	N/A
NOTA	None of the Above	7,489	0.85	
Majority		1,40,187	15.45	
Turnout		8,84,474	52.18	+10.56
BJP hold		Swing	+21.66	

=== 2009 ===
2009 Indian general election: Nawada
Party	Candidate	Votes	%	±%
BJP	Bhola Singh	130,608	22.46	
LJP	Veena Devi	95,691	16.45	
Independent	Raj Ballabh Prasad	78,543	13.51	
Independent	Kaushal Yadav	59,382	10.21	
BSP	Masih Uddin	46,528	8.00	
Independent	Anil Mehta	38,215	6.57	
Independent	Akhilesh Singh	28,811	4.95	
INC	Sunila Devi	19,482	3.35	
CPI(M)	Ganesh Shankar Vidyarthi	14,840	2.55	
Independent	8 Independent Candidates	51,439	8.84	
Others	4 Other Party Candidates	18,044	3.10	
Majority		34,917	6.01	
Turnout				
Swing to BJP from LJP		Swing		

=== 2004 ===
2004 Indian general election: Nawada (SC)
Party	Candidate	Votes	%	±%
RJD	Virchandra Paswan	489,992	48.51	
BJP	Sanjay Paswan	433,986	42.97	
Independent	Banbari Ram	52,384	5.19	
BSP	Bhola Ram	16,359	1.62	
IJP	Dalit Paswan	3,752	0.37	
CPI(ML)L	Mewalal Rajwanshi	3,623	0.36	
Independent	Hari Choudhary	2,219	0.22	
Independent	Pramod Kumar Akela	1,529	0.15	
Independent	Vijay Ravidas	1,467	0.15	
Independent	Shivlal Rajak	1,466	0.15	
JP	Mahendra Paswan	1,112	0.11	
Independent	Raghunandan Mochi	871	0.09	
Independent	Nagandra Kumar Vikal	659	0.07	
Independent	Polish Kumar Das	618	0.06	
Majority		56,006	5.54	
Turnout				
Swing to RJD from BJP		Swing		

=== 1999 ===
1999 Indian general election: Nawada (SC)
Party	Candidate	Votes	%	±%
BJP	Sanjay Paswan	453,943	53.38	
RJD	Vijay Kumar Choudhary	369,858	43.49	
CPI(ML)L	Gajendra Manjhi	11,288	1.33	
BSP	Bundel Manjhi	8,281	0.97	
AJBP	Ram Chandra Ram	1,456	0.17	
Independent	Devendra Prasad	1,216	0.14	
Independent	Pramod Choudhary	1,042	0.12	
JP	Vishnu Paswan	920	0.11	
Independent	Pulis Kr Das	877	0.10	
NCP	Sanjay Kumar Paswan	754	0.09	
Independent	Bhimal Choudhary	372	0.04	
Independent	Ram Pravesh Paswan	345	0.04	
Majority		84,085	9.89	
Turnout		859,271	73.19	
Swing to BJP from RJD		Swing		

=== 1998 ===
1998 Indian general election: Nawada (SC)
Party	Candidate	Votes	%	±%
RJD	Malti Devi	405,495	46.68	
BJP	Kameshwar Paswan	391,111	45.03	
Independent	Banwari Ram	38,792	4.47	
CPI(M)	Sarangdhar Paswan	21,678	2.50	
ABMSD	Yamuna Munjhi	3,365	0.39	
AJBP	Mathura Rajbanshi	3,079	0.35	
Independent	Kailash Paswan	1,421	0.16	
Independent	Kunwar Ram	1,143	0.13	
Independent	Arun Kumar	1,123	0.13	
Independent	Ramchandra Ram	888	0.10	
Independent	Ramjee Paswan	550	0.06	
Majority		14,384	1.65	
Turnout		877,588	74.83	
Swing to RJD from BJP		Swing		

=== 1996 ===
1996 Indian general election: Nawada (SC)
Party	Candidate	Votes	%	±%
BJP	Kameshwar Paswan	310,194	41.71	
CPI(M)	Premchand Ram	213,280	28.68	
Independent	Malati Devi	114,120	15.34	
INC	Shrimati Jyoti	67,031	9.01	
BSP	Arjun Ram	14,439	1.94	
AIIC(T)	Hardeyal Ram	237	0.03	
Independent	26 Independent Candidates	24,443	3.29	
Majority		96,914	13.03	
Turnout				
Swing to BJP from CPI(M)		Swing		

=== 1991 ===
1991 Indian general election: Nawada (SC)
Party	Candidate	Votes	%	±%
CPI(M)	Prem Chand Ram	418,010	51.75	
INC	Mahaveer Choudhary	316,417	39.17	
BJP	Satyadeva Narayan Arya	61,340	7.59	
BSP	Birendra Prasad	3,788	0.47	
JP	Aniruddha Manjhi	2,767	0.34	
Independent	12 Independent Candidates	5,475	0.68	
Majority		101,593	12.58	
Turnout		815,317	70.48	
Swing to CPI(M) from INC		Swing		

=== 1989 ===
1989 Indian general election: Nawada (SC)
Party	Candidate	Votes	%	±%
CPI(M)	Prem Pardeep	310,370	47.80	
BJP	Kamaswar Paswan	160,768	24.76	
INC	Kunwar Ram	159,358	24.54	
Others	2 Other Party Candidates	5,697	0.88	
Independent	6 Independent Candidates	13,133	2.02	
Majority		149,602	23.04	
Turnout				
Swing to CPI(M) from BJP		Swing		

=== 1984 ===
1984 Indian general election: Nawada (SC)
Party	Candidate	Votes	%	±%
INC	Kunwar Ram	351,358	64.36	
CPI(M)	Prem Pradeep	114,256	20.93	
BJP	Babu Lal	66,647	12.21	
Independent	8 Independent Candidates	13,687	2.51	
Majority		237,102	43.43	
Turnout		553,442	57.78	
Swing to INC from CPI(M)		Swing		

=== 1980 ===
1980 Indian general election: Nawada (SC)
Party	Candidate	Votes	%	±%
INC(I)	Kunwar Ram	183,736	42.05	
CPI(M)	Prem Pradeep	127,549	29.19	
JP	Nathuni Ram	108,564	24.84	
Independent	8 Independent Candidates	17,124	3.92	
Majority		56,187	12.86	
Turnout		442,515	52.04	
Swing to INC(I) from CPI(M)		Swing		

=== 1977 ===
1977 Indian general election: Nawada (SC)
Party	Candidate	Votes	%	±%
JP	Nathuni Ram	429,785	84.00	
INC	Mahabir Chaudhary	67,084	13.11	
Independent	Kailash Ram	3,698	0.72	
Independent	Nayan Tara Das	3,014	0.59	
Independent	Hari Narayan Prasad Shastry	2,656	0.52	
CPI	Mosafir Ram	2,191	0.43	
Independent	Lal Bahadur Ram Azad	2,057	0.40	
Independent	Ram Chandra Prasad	1,164	0.23	
Majority		362,701	70.89	
Turnout		518,053	69.87	
Swing to JP from INC		Swing		

=== 1971 ===
1971 Indian general election: Nawada
Party	Candidate	Votes	%	±%
INC	Sukhdeo Prasad Verma	152,569	38.73	
Independent	Mahanth Surya Prakash Narayan Puri	99,288	25.21	
ABJS	Daya Nand Sahay	82,235	20.88	
Independent	Mahesh Prasad	22,027	5.59	
CPI(M)	Ganesh Shanker Vidyarathi	18,219	4.63	
JP	Jagat Kishore Narayan Singh	11,829	3.00	
Independent	Suresh Kumar Bhatt	2,811	0.71	
Independent	Sukhdeo Ram	2,242	0.57	
Independent	Tirpit Sinha	1,061	0.27	
Independent	Visheshwar Prasad	886	0.22	
Independent	Dudheshwar Prasad	739	0.19	
Majority		53,281	13.52	
Turnout		400,431	63.11	
Swing to INC from Independent		Swing		

=== 1967 ===
1967 Indian general election: Nawada
Party	Candidate	Votes	%	±%
Independent	M. S. P. N. Puri	110,766	37.71	
INC	G. P. Sinha	90,546	30.83	
CPI	A. Yadav	46,267	15.75	
ABJS	R. Deyal	31,681	10.79	
PSP	A. Prasad	14,458	4.92	
Majority		20,220	6.88	
Turnout		314,878	54.97	
Swing to Independent from INC		Swing		

=== 1962 ===
1962 Indian general election: Nawada (SC)
Party	Candidate	Votes	%	±%
INC	Ramdhani Das	99,106	51.34	
ABJS	Akloo Manjhi	27,712	14.36	
CPI	Naurangi Mushar	26,733	13.85	
SWA	Bundi Ram Pasi	19,256	9.98	
PSP	Lala Ram	15,231	7.89	
RRP	Barho Rajwar	4,994	2.59	
Majority		71,394	36.98	
Turnout		203,376	48.32	
Swing to INC from ABJS		Swing		

=== 1957 ===
1957 Indian general election: Nawada
Party	Candidate	Votes	%	±%
INC	Satyabhama Devi	109,255	20.39	
INC	Ramdhani Das	79,324	14.81	
CNSPJP	Captain Mahraj Gopal Saran Singh	53,568	10.00	
PSP	Bigeshwar Mishra	49,957	9.32	
PSP	Kesh Ram	44,605	8.33	
CPI	Ramalgan Mochi	43,346	8.09	
CPI	Ram Lakhan Pd. Singh	38,822	7.25	
Independent	Jadunandan Mahto	38,526	7.19	
CNSPJP	Sheo Sahay Singh	29,558	5.52	
Independent	Ramdahin Manjhi	29,371	5.48	
Independent	Keshab Singh	19,412	3.62	
Majority		29,931	5.58	
Turnout		535,744	37.29	
Swing to INC from INC		Swing		

== See also ==
- Nawada district
- List of constituencies of the Lok Sabha
