= Jitendra Kumar Singh =

Indian oncologist

Dr. Jitendra Kumar Singh
- Born: 1952 (age 73–74); Majhauni, Banka, Bihar, India
- Occupation: Oncologist
- Spouse: Arati Sinha
- Children: 2
- Awards: Padma Shri; Pratibha Samman; Gunilla Bental Oration Award
- Website: http://www.ssinstituteofmedicalsciences.com/

Dr. Jitendra Kumar Singh is an Indian oncologist, the ex director of Mahavir Cancer Institute & Research Centre and the president of Cancer Care India, the apex body for cancer support organisations in India. He was honoured by the Government of India, in 2012, with the fourth highest Indian civilian award of Padma Shri.

== Early life ==
I know, as an oncologist that one-third of all the cancer is preventable, another one-third can be cured if detected early and the remaining one-third cancer patients can lead a pain free life till death. Cancer survivors should share their life experience in various platforms to dispel the myths about cancer among people.

Jitendra Kumar Singh was born to a freedom fighter, in the village of Majhauni of Banka district, in the Indian state of Bihar in 1952. He did his schooling at SMP School, Jethour and graduated in medicine, with National Merit Scholarship, from the erstwhile Prince of Wales Medical College, (present day Patna Medical College) under Patna University in 1975. His post graduation was in Radiotherapy which he completed in 1980 from the same university. He also did advanced training at Tata Memorial Hospital, Mumbai during 1985–86.

Jitendra Kumar Singh started his career as a faculty member at the Radium Institute of Patna Medical College and Hospital where he worked for 14 years before joining Darbhanga Medical College and Hospital as an additional professor. In 1981, he joined Mahavir Cancer Sansthan as its director, a post he holds till September 2014, and currently he is serving S.S.Hospital and Director.

== Achievements ==
Jitendra Kumar Singh joined Mahavir Cancer Sansthan as the director when it was in the third year of its existence. The institution, during his tenure, is reported to have grown from a 100 bedded hospital to be rated as the second largest cancer hospital in India with facilities to accommodate 450 in-patients attended to by 125 doctors, 18 radiologists and 700 staff. The hospital is reported to have a patient roll of 300,000 with 26,500 new patients added every year.

Jitendra Singh is known to have been active in the cancer awareness programs in the state of Bihar and his efforts are reported behind the establishment of a community oncology department at Mahavir Cancer Sansthan. He has also contributed to many cancer awareness campaigns such as the one with the participation of celebrities like Hema Malini, Ram Nath Kovind Shabana Azmi and Shatrughan Sinha.

Singh is known to have been active in research and has served as the principal investigator in 25 national and international clinical trials of cancer medicines. He has headed 12 major projects initiated by the Department of Science and Technology and the Indian Council of Medical Research such as the Task Force for Gallbladder carcinoma. He is also known to have contributed to the development of palliative care of cancer in the country.

Singh is an examiner of the Diplomate of National Board of Examinations and is an accredited supervisor of post graduate courses in many colleges. He is the president of Cancer Care India, the apex body of cancer organisations in India and the Association of Gynaecological Oncologist of India and has served as the president of the Indian Brachytherapy Society and the Indian Association of Hyperthermic Oncology and Medicine. He is the secretary of the Indian Society of Oncology and has served Dr. Shantha Breast Cancer Foundation (SBKF)(former Breast Cancer Foundation), India, as its secretary. Singh is also credited with around 80 articles published in national and international journals.

Dr. Singh is also inclined spiritually. He uses spirituality profusely during his counseling sessions with cancer patients. He never practices paternalism, rather encourages the patients to take the medical advice and believe in God. Many of the patients are inclined.

Dr. J. K. Singh is very active in organising scientific conferences and seminars. He has been actively invloed in organising more than 100 scientific conferences. Also Dr. Singh is known for organising outreach cancer awareness program in entire Bihar

== Awards and honours ==
Pratibha Patil granting Padma Shri to Dr.J K Singh

Jitendra Kumar Singh, a 1995 Fellow of the Indian College of Radiation Oncology, was awarded the Pratibha Samman in 2009. In 2010, he received the Gunilla Bental Oration Award from Rajiv Gandhi Cancer Institute and Research Centre. The same year, Indian Institute of Business Management, Patna conferred honorary MBA degree on him. The Government of India awarded him the civilian honour of Padma Shri in 2012. Dr Singh is now The National Vice-President Indian Medical Association elected in June 2014.
