= Patna Medical College and Hospital =

Hospital in Bihar, India

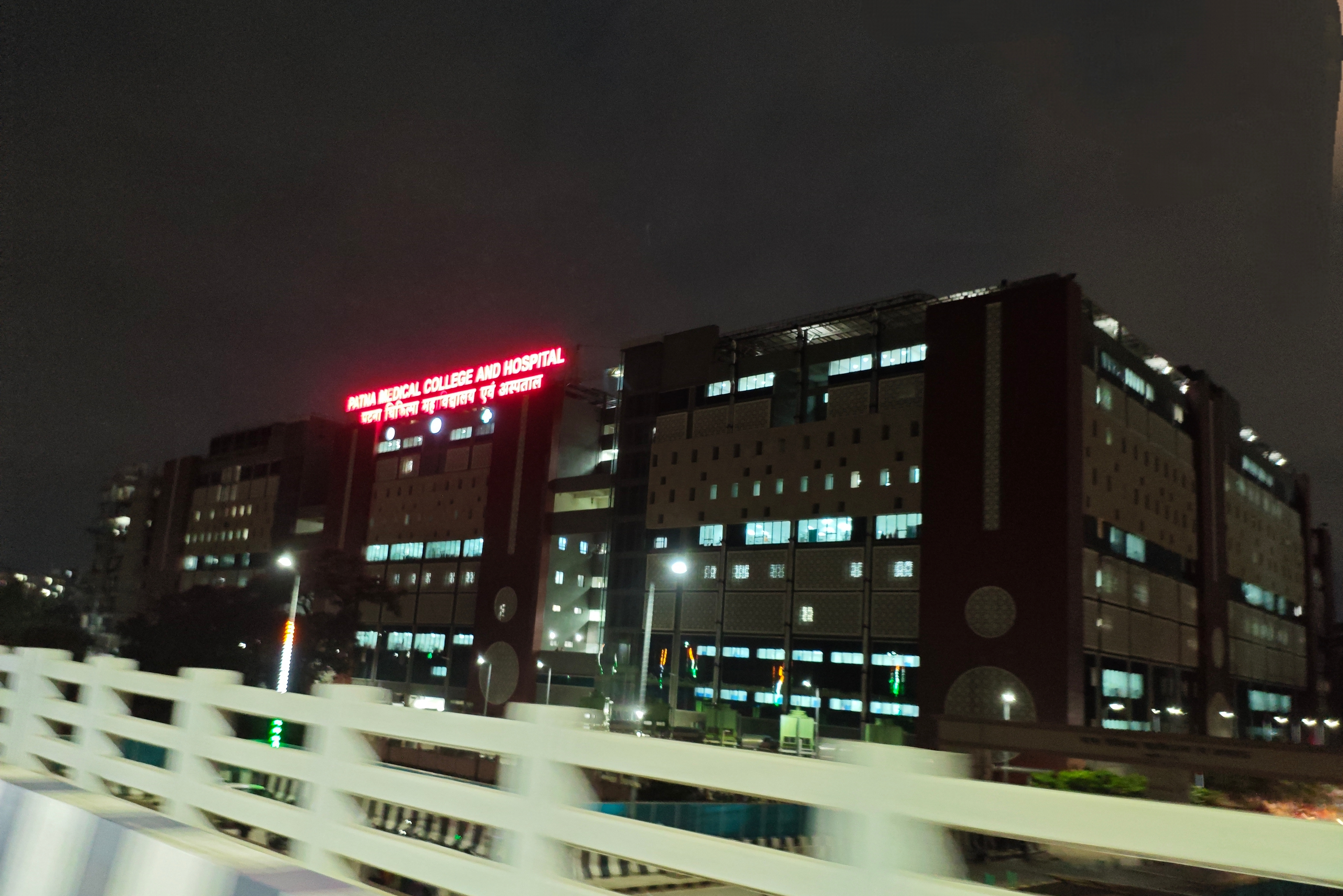
- Other name: PMCH
- Former names: Temple Medical School; Prince of Wales Medical College
- Motto: Sarve Santu Nirāmayāḥ (Sanskrit)
- Motto in English: Let all be healthy
- Type: Government
- Established: 1874; 152 years ago (as Temple Medical School); February 25, 1925; 101 years ago (as PMCH)
- Affiliations: National Medical Commission
- Academic affiliations: Bihar University of Health Sciences
- Principal: Dr. Geeta Sinha (acting)
- Location: Patna, Bihar, 800004, India; 25.620914°N 85.160317°E
- Campus: Urban
- Website: pmchpatna.in

Patna Medical College and Hospital (abbreviated as PMCH), established in 1925 and originally known as Prince of Wales Medical College and then Temple Medical School (1874), is a medical college located in Patna, the state capital of Bihar, India.

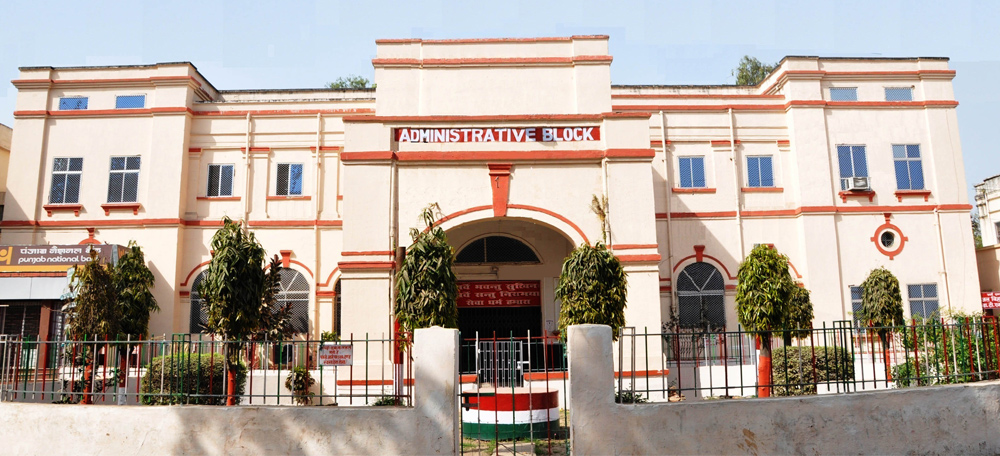
Patna Medical College

It is located on the southern bank of the river Ganges and is now affiliated with Bihar University of Health Sciences (previously: Patna University and Aryabhatta Knowledge University). The exact location is on Ashok Rajpath which is also home to other colleges of Patna University. It has more than 1748 beds which is at par with AIIMS. The emergency ward is called IGCE (Indira Gandhi Central Emergency) and has an additional 220 beds. It is one of the busiest hospitals in India. The average daily outpatient load is one of the highest in India.

== Campus ==
Patna Medical College is situated in Ashok Rajpath. The nearest airport is the Patna Airport which is around 10–11 km from the campus. The nearest railway station is the Patna Junction around 5 km from the campus. Gandhi Maidan Bus Stand is 2 km from the campus.

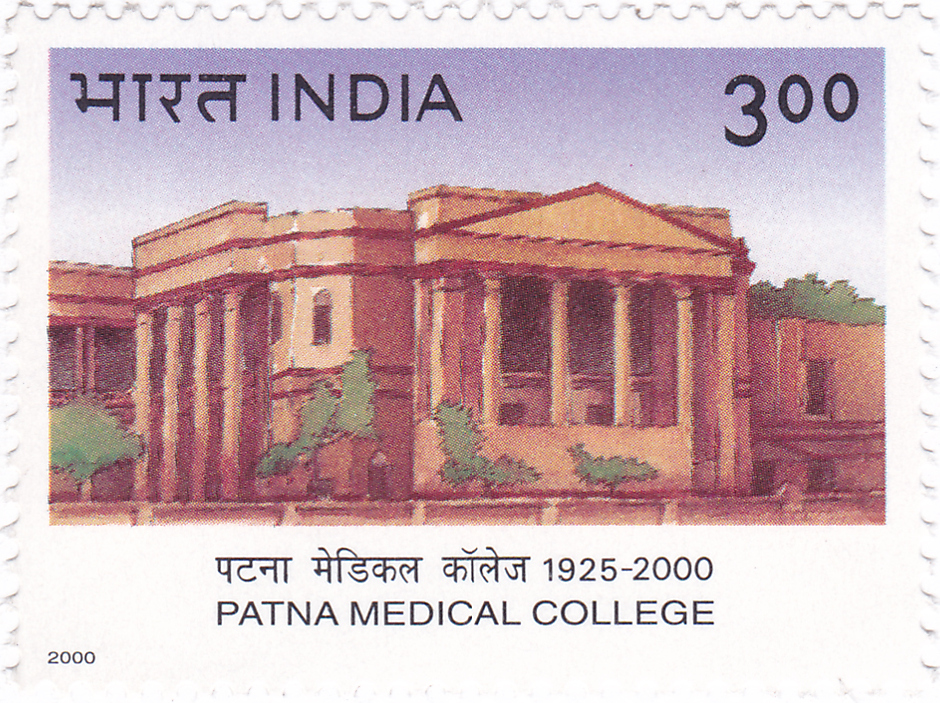
A 2000 postage stamp commemorating the 75th anniversary of Patna Medical College

== Upgrades ==
PMCH is currently being upgraded to be a 5462-bed hospital. This was one of the 37 proposals approved by the cabinet of Government of Bihar in November 2018. The new PMCH premises will be spread over 72.44 lakh square foot area. The new PMCH will have 250 MBBS seats (against the existing 150 MBBS seats), and 200 PG seats (against the existing 146 PG seats). The Rs 5,540- crore project will be executed by the Bihar Medical Infrastructure Structure Corporation Limited. The new hospital will be linked with the under-construction double-decker flyover along Ashok Rajpath and Loknayak Ganga Path (Ganga Expressway). The new building will be constructed employing the Seismic base isolation technique that would protect it from earthquakes, equipped with a helipad on its top.

== PMCH Metro station ==
PMCH will soon get Metro connectivity as the upcoming PMCH metro station under Patna Metro Rail Project (PMRP) will pass beneath the hospital premises. PMCH station will be part of the 14.45km long Patna Railway Station - Patliputra ISBT Corridor (Corridor-2) of the Patna Metro. PMCH metro station will have 4 entry and exit gates, two inside the PMCH campus and the other two towards the opposite side of road on the Ashok Rajpath. A small subway of 30 metre will also be constructed to provide connectivity towards the entry/exit gate on either side. PMCH metro Station having a length of 225 m, is coming partially inside the campus of PMCH and partially inside the campus of Anjuman Islamia Hall.

In July 2022, the main gate of Patna Medical College and Hospital (PMCH) on Ashok Rajpath was shut to undertake construction work for metro corridor-2. An old gate that led to the emergency department building on its western side, which was closed several years ago, has been reopened to facilitate the movement of doctors and other staff, patients, attendants, ambulances and general public.

== Notable alumni ==
- Dukhan Ram (Padma Bhushan)
- B. Mukhopadhyaya (Padma Bhushan)
- Jitendra Kumar Singh (1968 batch)- Padma Shri (2012)
- Narendra Kumar Pandey (1974 batch) – Padma Shri (2014) – Chairman and Director of Asian Institute of Medical Sciences
- Alok Kumar Suman (M.P)
- S. N. Arya (Padma Shri)
- C. P. Thakur, former Union Minister - Padma Shri, Padma Bhushan
- Gopal Prasad Sinha
- Sanjay Jaiswal
- Sunil Shroff
- Vijay Prakash Singh (1972 batch)- Padma Shri (2003)
- Vinay Kumar – psychiatrist; former president of the Indian Psychiatric Society
- Rabindra Narain Singh – Orthopaedic Surgeon, Padma Shri Awardee and Former President of Vishwa Hindu Parishad

== Notable faculty ==
- Gaya Prasad - Former Lecturer, Professor and Principal of P.M.C.H.

== See also ==
- SKMCH Muzaffarpur
- AIIMS Patna
- IGIMS Patna
- Nalanda Medical College and Hospital
- Darbhanga Medical College and Hospital
