= Mahamaya Prasad Sinha =

Indian politician

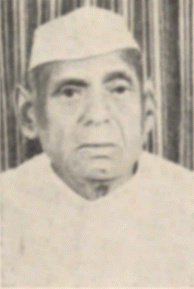

5th Chief Minister of Bihar
- In office 5 March 1967 – 28 January 1968
- Preceded by: K. B. Sahay
- Succeeded by: Satish Prasad Singh

Member of Parliament, Lok Sabha
- In office 1977-1980
- Preceded by: Ramavatar Shastri
- Succeeded by: Ramavatar Shastri
- Constituency: Patna, Bihar

Personal details
- Born: 1 May 1909 Siwan, Bengal Presidency, British India
- Died: 1987 (aged 77–78) Patna, Bihar, India
- Party: Janata Party
- Other political affiliations: Indian National Congress, Jana Kranti Dal

Mahamaya Prasad Sinha (1 May 1909 – 1987) was an Indian politician. He was the fifth Chief Minister of Bihar from March 1967 to January 1968 which was the first non congress Government in Bihar. Sinha was a follower of Maharaja Kamakhya Narain Singh and Maharaj Kumar Basant Narain Singh and was a member of their political Jan Kranti Dal. He was elected to the 6th Lok Sabha, lower house of the Parliament of India from the Patna constituency of Bihar in 1977. Before quitting Congress, he was among the four prominent leaders of Bihar unit during 1960s, the others being Krishna Ballabh Sahay, Satyendra Narayan Sinha and Binodanand Jha.

== Early life ==
Mahamaya Prasad was born in 1909. He sprang from a very aristocratic Kayastha family of Siwan district in Bihar. His academic career was marked by brilliance and popularity. He was in the public gaze as an athlete.

== Political career ==
In 1929 he was to go to the I.C.S but joined the Civil Disobedience Movement. He was appointed the Dictator of the District and imprisoned for one year. Again he was arrested and sentenced to seven months imprisonment. In the prison he had a heat stroke and completely lost his voice.

Since 1931 he was a member of the A.I.C.C. for many years and became the President of the District Congress Committee. He was a very prominent political worker of Bihar. He was an able organizer and a gifted writer. Said Babu Rajender Prasad, "Mr Sinha is a most powerful speaker and one of the best workers of the province and is just like a son to me".
