= Ramavatar Shastri =

Indian politician (1920–1988)

Member of Parliament, Lok Sabha
- In office 1967–1977
- Preceded by: Ram Dulari Sinha
- Succeeded by: Mahamaya Prasad Sinha
- In office 1980–1984
- Preceded by: Mahamaya Prasad Sinha
- Succeeded by: Chandreshwar Prasad Thakur
- Constituency: Patna, Bihar

Personal details
- Born: June 1920 Saguna, Nayatola, Danapur Cantt P.O Patna, Bihar, British India
- Died: 26 January 1988 (aged 67) Patna, Bihar
- Party: Communist Party of India
- Spouse: Sushila Devi

Ramavatar Shastri (June 1920 – 26 January 1988) was an Indian politician. He was elected to the Lok Sabha, the lower house of the Parliament of India from the Patna in Bihar as a member of the Communist Party of India.
