= Ram Dulari Sinha =

Indian politician (1922–1994)

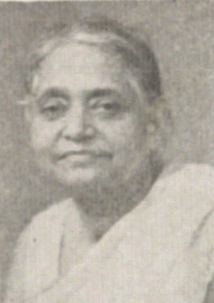

9th Governor of Kerala
- In office 23 February 1988 – 12 February 1990
- Chief minister: E. K. Nayanar
- Preceded by: P. Ramachandran
- Succeeded by: Sarup Singh

Member of Parliament, Lok Sabha
- In office 1962–1967
- Preceded by: Sarangdhar Sinha
- Succeeded by: Ramavatar Shastri
- Constituency: Patna
- In office 1980–1988
- Constituency: Sheohar
- Preceded by: Thakur Girjanandan Singh
- Succeeded by: Hari Kishore Singh

Personal details
- Born: 8 December 1922 Manikpur, Bihar and Orissa Province, British India
- Died: 31 August 1994 (aged 71) New Delhi, India
- Party: Indian National Congress
- Spouse: Thakur Jugal Kishore Sinha
- Children: Dr. Madhurendra Kumar Singh
- Parent: Mahendra Singh
- Education: Banaras Hindu University, Patna University

Ram Dulari Sinha (8 December 1922 – 31 August 1994) was a nationalist, freedom fighter, Congress parliamentarian, Union Minister, and Governor. She was the first woman in Bihar to have master's degree and she was also the first woman from Bihar to be appointed Governor. Nonetheless she was the elected Vice Chairperson of the International Labour Organisation.

Sinha was a distinguished figure, serving as a Member of Parliament Lok Sabha from Patna Lok Sabha constituency and Sheohar Lok Sabha constituency respectively. She was Member of First Bihar Legislative Assembly from Majorganj Assembly constituency in Sitamarhi district and was also elected to the Vidhan Sabha from Gopalganj Assembly constituency several times.

She was from Bihar and holding ministerial positions in various central ministries. Possessing a strong educational background, she actively participated in the freedom movement and remained dedicated to advocating for the rights of the working class even after independence. She played a leadership role in numerous labor organizations and campaigned against social issues such as the dowry system, purdah system, and untouchability.

== Freedom movement and Early Political Life ==
She hailed from Gopalganj, belonged to Rajput caste Bihar, and was deeply involved in the Indian freedom movement. Sinha's name commands immense respect in Bihar, owing to her significant contributions. Her entire family was deeply engaged in the freedom movement. In 1947-48, she assumed the role of General Secretary of the Bihar Pradesh Youth Congress. Concurrently, she was appointed the Organization Secretary of the Bihar Mahila Congress, showcasing her dedication and leadership within the political sphere.

Her political journey commenced with her victory in the Majorganj constituency of Bihar during the legislative elections of 1951. Later, she represented Patna Lok sabha constituency in the 3rd Lok Sabha in 1962.

== As Union state minister and Governor of Kerala ==
In subsequent years, she secured consecutive re-elections to the Bihar Vidhan Sabha from the Gopalganj constituency in 1969 and 1972. During the period from 1971 to 1977, she served as a State Cabinet Minister in the Government of Bihar, managing various portfolios including Labour and Employment, Tourism, Sugar Cane, Social Welfare, and Parliamentary Affairs.

Ramdulari Sinha assumed a leadership role in multiple labor organizations and actively campaigned against prevalent social issues. In recognition of her efforts and leadership, she was elected as the Vice President of the International Labor Organization, a United Nations agency, in 1973.

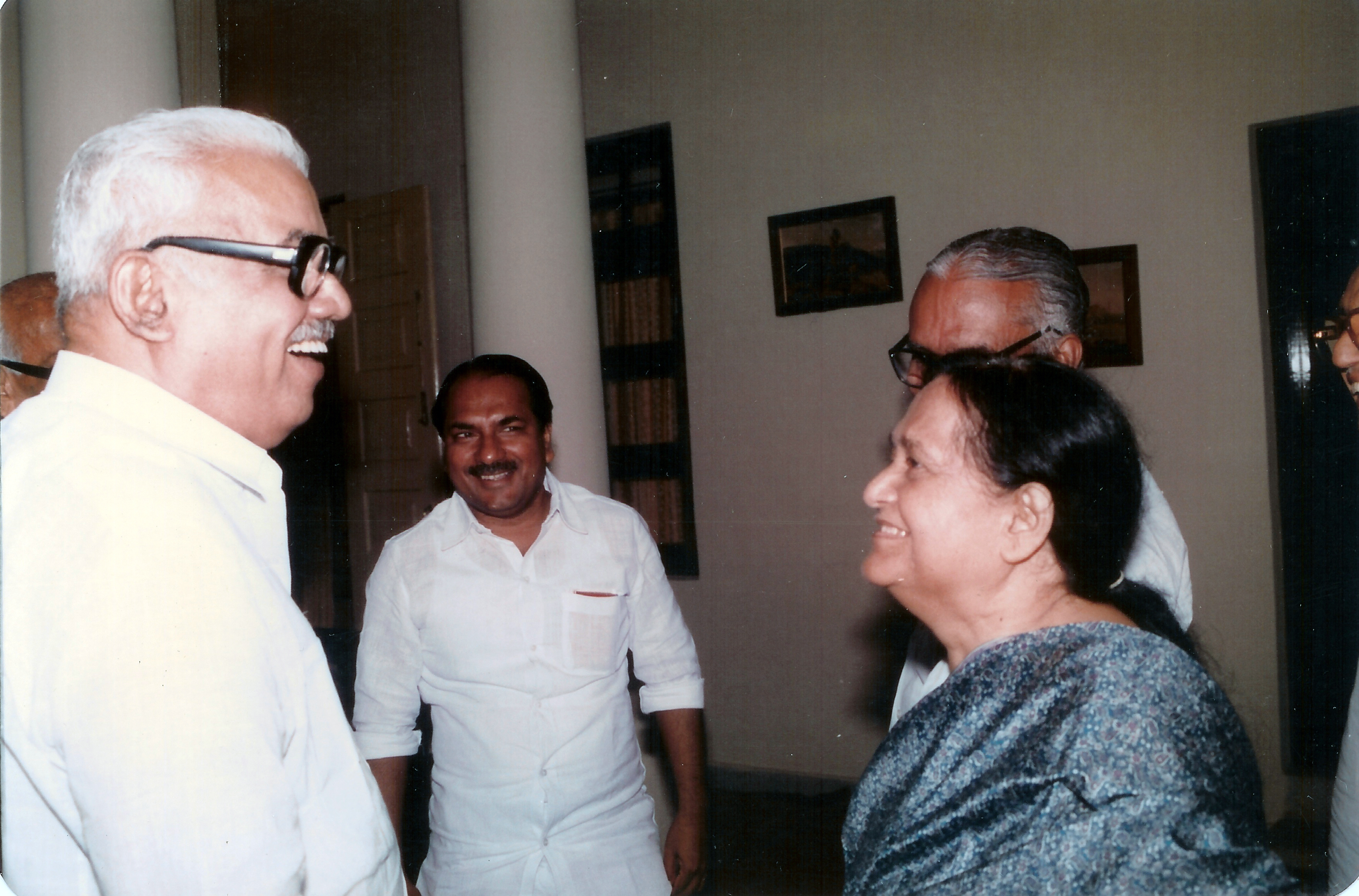
Ram Dulari Sinha with the leaders of Kerala

She again secured two consecutive victories in the Lok Sabha from the Sheohar parliamentary constituency in 1980 and 1984. During her tenure from 1980 to 1984, she served in various Union Ministries of State, managing portfolios. She was union minister of State of Information and Broadcasting from 8 June 1980 – 19 October 1980, then of Ministry Labor and Rehabilitation from 19 October 1980 to 15 January 1982. She got the portfolio Minister of State in the Ministry of Steel and Mines from 15 January 1982 to 14 February 1983 and Ministry of Commerce and Industry from 14 February 1983 to 7 February.

Subsequently, from 1984 to 1985, she held the position of Union Minister of State for Home Affairs twice in the Government of India under prime minister Indira Gandhi from 7 February 1984 to 31 October 1984 and Rajiv Gandhi from 4 November 1984 to 25 September 1985.

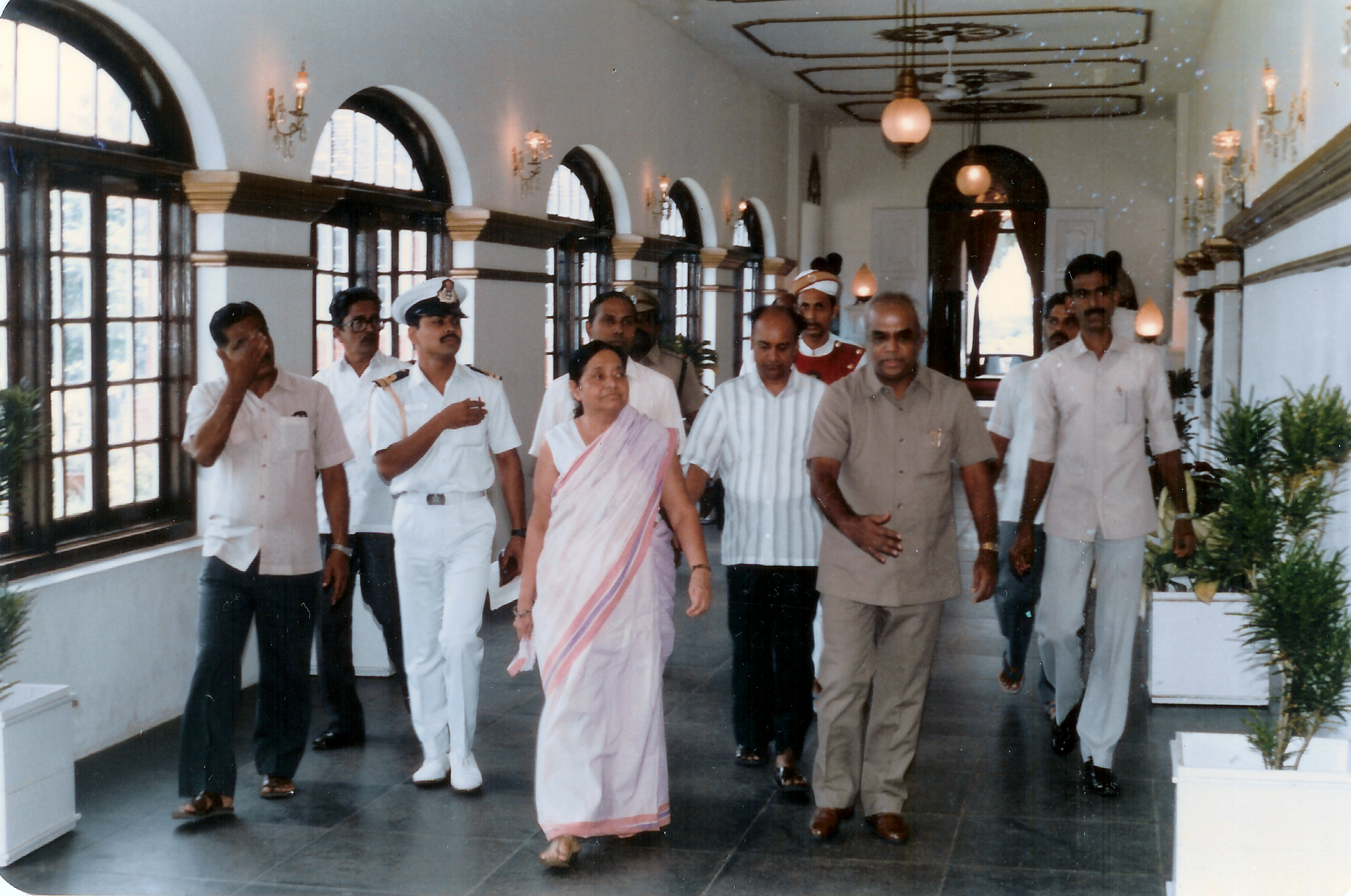
Ram Dulari Sinha, as Governor of Kerala

She became the Governor of Kerala on 23 February 1988 to 12 February 1990.

== Election results ==
Lok Sabha Election results

Year	Constituency	Votes Polled	Vote %	Winner
1962	Patna	101687	44.89%	Yes
1980	Sheohar	174188	41.95%	Yes
1984	Sheohar	254881	52.45%	Yes

Bihar State Assembly Election results

Year	Constituency	Votes Polled	Vote %	Winner
1951	Majorganj	11520	51.73%	Yes
1969	Gopalganj	15197	36.09%	Yes
1972	Gopalganj	19749	42.36%	Yes

== Death ==
Ram Dulari Sinha, having won many a battle in her time, and died on 31 August 1994 of heart attack, after a bypass surgery which was done by Dr. Naresh Trehan the renowned cardiologist at the Escorts Hospital, Delhi.

== See also ==
- List of governors of Kerala
- Gopalganj district, India
- Sheohar
