= Nathuni Ram =

Indian politician

Member of Parliament, Lok Sabha
- In office 1977-1980
- Preceded by: Sukhdeo Prasad Verma
- Succeeded by: Kunwar Ram
- Constituency: Nawada, Bihar

Personal details
- Party: Janata Party

Nathuni Ram is an Indian politician. He was elected to the lower House of the Indian Parliament the Lok Sabha from Nawada, Bihar as a member of the Janata Party.
