= Vijay Prakash (gastroenterologist) =

Indian gastroenterologist

Dr. Vijay Prakash Singh
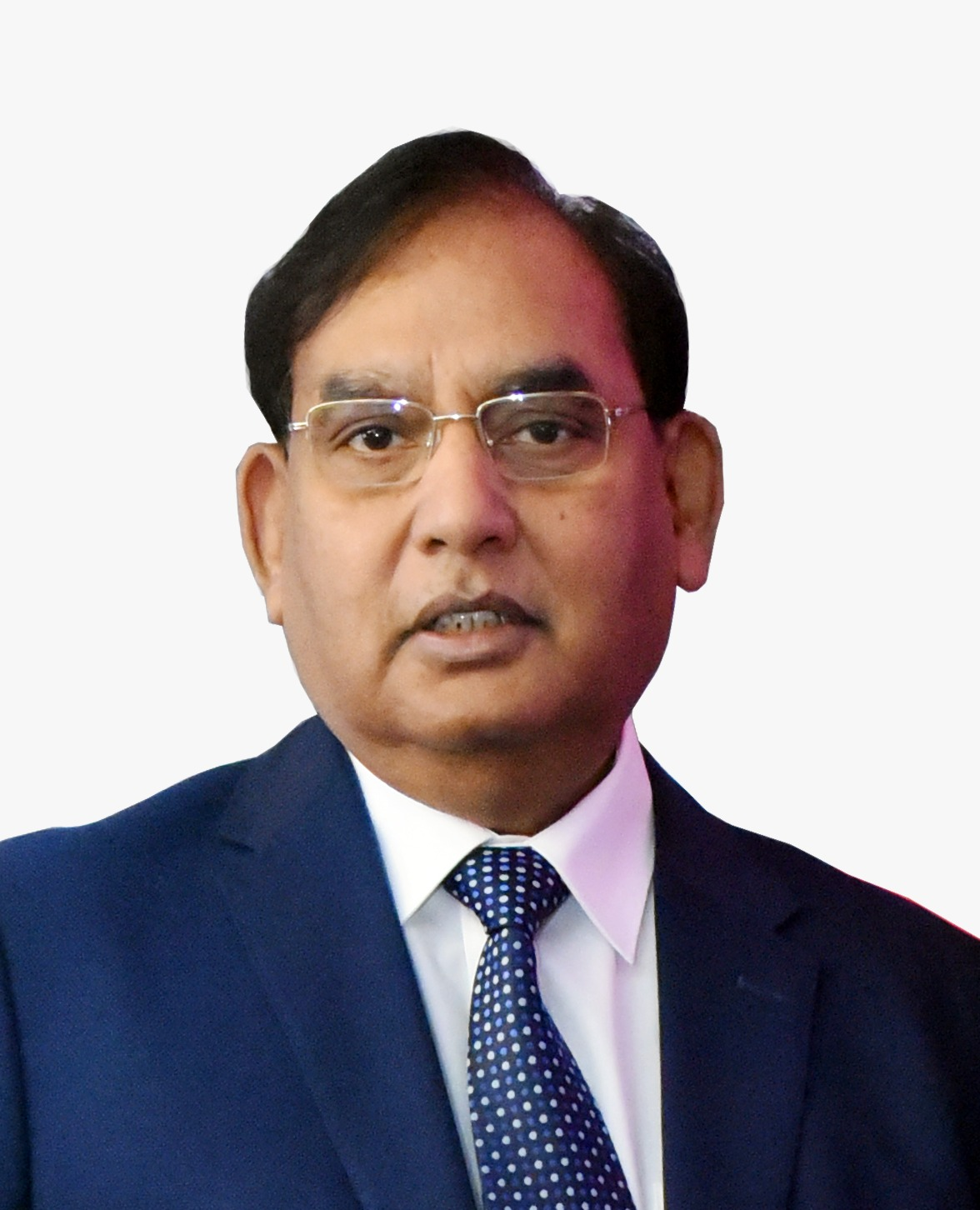
- Dr. Vijay Prakash 2018
- Born: Banka, Bhagalpur, Bihar, India 19 February 1954 (age 72)
- Occupation: Gastroenterologist
- Known for: Gastroenterology
- Spouse: Dr.Rashmi Singh
- Children: Two
- Awards: Padma Shri (2003), Icons of Patna, Bihar, (2018)
- Website: bigapollospectra.com/doctor/dr-vijay-prakash

Vijay Prakash Singh, also known as Vijay Prakash, is an Indian gastroenterologist and the Head of Department of Gastroenterology at Patna Medical College, Bihar. He was honoured by the Government of India in 2003 with Padma Shri, the fourth highest Indian civilian award, and only the 7th doctor in Bihar state to receive the award.

== Life ==
Prakash was born in Banka. He is reported to have contributed to the establishment of the department of gastroenterology at the medical college and at Indira Gandhi Institute of Medical Sciences (IGIMS). He is also involved with BIG Hospital Institute of Gastroenterology as the chief gastroenterologist and medical director. He is a member of the executive council of the Medical Council of India and a member of the Indian Society of Gastroenterology. He is the author of several medical research papers, published in peer-reviewed journals.

He has given talks on hepatitis and non-alcoholic steato-hepatitis (NASH): a severe form of non alcoholic fatty liver disease (NAFLD).

== Awards ==
- Padma Shri (2003) by the Government of India
- "Icons of Bihar" by Outlook in 2018

== See also ==
- Gastroenterology
