= Narendra Kumar Pandey =

Indian surgeon

- Born: 1951 (age 74–75); Bishnupura, Saran, Bihar, India
- Occupation: Surgeon
- Spouse: Padma Pandey
- Children: Anupam Pandey; Prashant Pandey
- Parent(s): Jagat Pandey; Vidya Pandey
- Awards: Padma Shri; Dr. B. C. Roy Award; Delhi Doctors Association Award; Betadine Achievement Award; Doctor of Science (Honoris Causa)
- Website: Official web site of Asian Institute of Medical Sciences

Narendra Kumar Pandey is an Indian surgeon, and founder of the Asian Institute of Medical Sciences. He was bestowed the Padma Shri, the fourth highest civilian award, in 2014.

== Biography ==
The majority of the Indian population still does not have access to basic healthcare, forget about the advanced technology. Our first priority should be to make healthcare accessible to all. We have been making plans only on paper. says Dr. Narendra Kumar Pandey.

Diagram showing video assisted thoracoscopy (VATS) CRUK 378

Narendra Kumar Pandey was born on 1 January 1951, in the remote village of Bishnupura, in Saran district of Bihar, India. He was the eldest of three children born to Jagat Pandey, a village head master, and Vidya Pandey. For his early education, he studied in the local village school where one of his uncles was a teacher. However, he had to complete his school education at different locations when his father joined the central government service and was posted at various locations across northern India. Pandey chose a medical career, inspired by one of his uncles who was a medical practitioner, and joined Patna Medical College where he acquired his medical degree of MBBS, in 1974, and completed his residency there.

Pandey started his career at the Danapore Block Hospital, a suburb near Patna city, and continued there for one year. While working at the Block hospital, he married Padma, a student of Patna Science College, in 1975. Disillusioned with the work at Block hospital, which consisted of mainly vasectomies, Pandey moved to London in 1976, where he got an opportunity to study further in the city. The move to London opened up new avenues for Pandey and he redid his internship at the Ashford Hospital, London, in surgery, and at the Aberystwyth District General Hospital and North Devon District Hospital, in orthopedics. He also worked at the District Hospital, in Barnstable. He did his FACS at the Royal College of Surgeons of Edinburgh, in 1982, and continued in the UK, working at various hospitals like Hammersmith Hospital, Kings College, Charing Cross Hospital, and Middle Sex Hospital. His stay in UK also gave him opportunities to work and study under many renowned surgeons like Sir Alfred Patrick M. Forrest, Professor Mansel, Professor Blumgart and Professor Russell, and gain experience in liver and pancreatic surgery and minimal access surgery.

Pandey returned to India in 1984 and joined Fortis Escorts Hospital, Faridabad, in the capacity of a consultant and worked there till 2007 when he moved out as the executive director of the Hospital. He also served as a director board member of the Fortis Escorts Heart Institute, Delhi, during that time. By this time, his mind was set on building a medical centre of his own and he founded the Asian Institute of Medical Sciences in 2010.

Narendra Kumar Pandey lives in Faridabad with the families of his four children, Anupam, Neha, Prashant, and Smriti, and together they look after the running of the hospital.

== Achievements and legacy ==
Besides his services as one of the leading thoracic surgeons in India, Pandey is credited with pioneering work in Video-assisted thoracoscopic surgery. He has also conducted various seminars, workshops and training programmes in general surgery. However, the legacy Pandey has left is the medical institution he has founded, Asian Institute of Medical Sciences.

=== Asian Institute of Medical Sciences ===
Narendra Kumar Pandey founded the Asian Institute of Medical Sciences on 1 February 2010. The institute is a super specialty tertiary care medical institution, in Faridabad. and is reported to have facilities to accommodate 350 in-patients at a time. The institute is claimed to provide the patients with preventive, diagnostic, therapeutic, rehabilitative, palliative and support services. Pandey is the chairman and managing director of the institution and his sons and daughters and their families assist Pandey in running the institution. The hospital is accredited by National Accreditation Board for Hospitals & Healthcare Providers (NABH) and National Accreditation Board for Testing and Calibration Laboratories (NABL).

== Positions ==
Pandey holds many positions:

- Chairman and Managing Director - Asian Institute of Medical Sciences
- Vice President - International College of Surgeons, Chicago
- Council Member - International College of Surgeons, Chicago
- Joint Editor - Indian Journal of Surgery
- Secretary - Indian Health care Federation
- Secretary - Raj Nanda Pulmonary disease Trust
- Former President - Association of Surgeons of India

Pandey was an official examiner for MRCS and FRCS examinations of the Royal College of Surgeons of Edinburgh till 2000, and the National Board of Examinations (NBE) India. He is also a member of the National committee on Health of the Confederation of Indian Industry, Senate of the Teerthanker Mahaveer University and the Governing Council of the College of Surgeons of India. he also serves as the director of Lakhani India Ltd, Blue Sapphire Healthcare Pvt. Ltd., Escorts Employees Welfare Ltd., Turquoise House of Design and Trading Pvt. Ltd.

== Awards and recognitions ==
The Government of India, in 2014, honoured Narendra Kumar Pandey, by awarding him the civilian honour of Padma Shri. The Government had earlier conferred on him the Dr. B. C. Roy Award, in 2008. He is also a Fellow of the Royal College of Surgeons of Edinburgh and a Fellow of the Royal College of Physicians and Surgeons of Glasgow. He has attended many national and international conferences and has delivered keynote addresses. He was a Guest of Honour at the third World Congress of the Laparoscopic Surgeons, organized by the World Association of Laparoscopic Surgeons, on 14-15 February 2012, in Gurgaon.

The Delhi Doctors' Association, in 1997, conferred the Distinguished Service Award on Pandey. He also received Betadine Achievement Award from the Association of Surgeons of India in 2010. The Teerthanker Mahaveer University awarded him the Doctor of Science (Honoris Causa) in 2013.
