= Shailendra Nath Shrivastava =

Indian writer and politician (1936–2006)

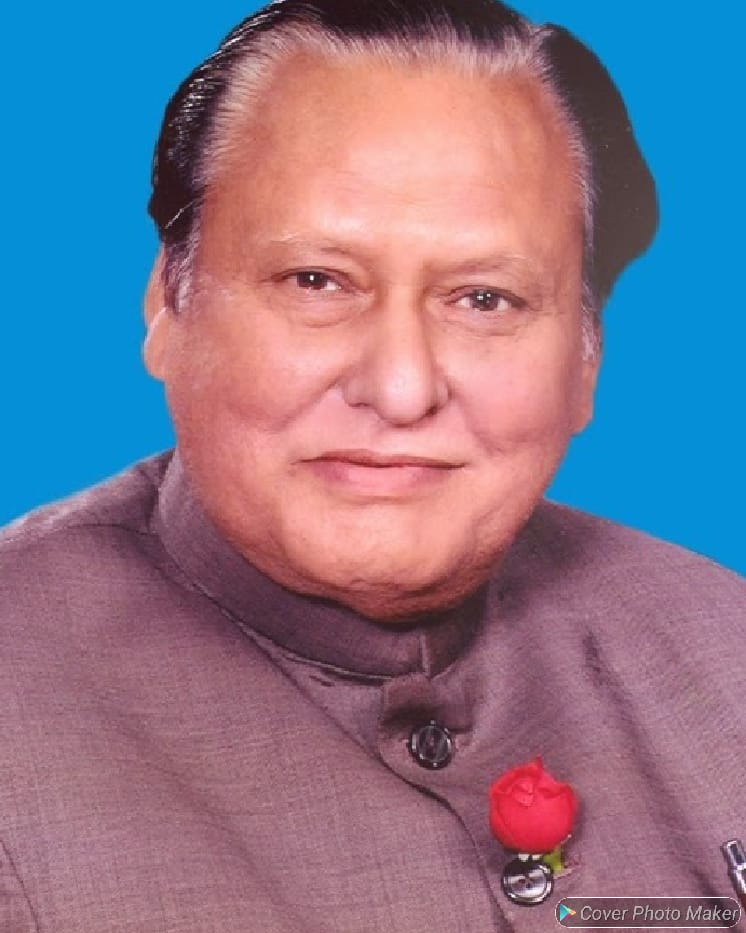
- Dr.Shailendra Nath Shrivastava

Member of Parliament, Lok Sabha
- In office 1989–1991
- Preceded by: C. P. Thakur
- Succeeded by: Ram Kripal Yadav
- Constituency: Patna

Member of Bihar Legislative Assembly
- In office 1980–1985
- Preceded by: Mohammad Shahabuddin
- Succeeded by: Akeel Haider
- Constituency: Patna Central

Personal details
- Born: 20 March 1936; Chausa, Bihar, British India
- Died: 12 February 2006 (aged 69); Patna, Bihar, India
- Political party: Bharatiya Janata Party
- Spouse: Dr. Veena Rani Shrivastava (m. 1959)
- Parent: Dr. Murlidhar Shrivastava (father)
- Education: M.A. Ph.D

Dr. Shailendra Nath Shrivastava (20 March 1936 – 12 February 2006) was an Indian essayist and poet, who wrote in Hindi, English and Bhojpuri. His body of work comprised over 100 publications of books like poetry, biographies, essays, and literary criticism. He also featured in more than 120 programs/broadcast of All India Radio / Doordarshan Patna and Delhi branch.

He was former Indian politician from Bihar born at Chausa, Bhojpur district. He visited many foreign countries such as England, Scotland, Wales, France, Germany, Holland, Mauritius and Nepal. In 1980 he was elected to Bihar Legislative Assembly and in 1989, he was elected to Lok Sabha from Patna constituency of Bihar. He was a recipient of the civilian honor of Padma Shri (2003).

== Life and career ==
Shailendra Nath Shrivastava was born on 20 March 1936 in Chausa, Bihar. He started his schooling in 1943 at Ganesh Memorial Middle School in Siwan, Bihar. In 1956, he graduated in Hindi (Hons.). In 1958, he did his post-graduation in Hindi and in 1969 he got his Ph.D. from Patna University.

In Sampoorn Kranti of 1974 to 1975, Shrivastava played a major role as the guide of the Student Movement in which he was arrested in 'Misa'. After being released from prison, he was also active in making student movement to a mass movement. In 1975 July, during the Emergency, he was again arrested. After being released from prison, he asked Jayaprakash Narayan to lead the entire revolutionary movement.

He later joined ABVP, Bhartiya Jana Sangh, BJP. He was the former Indian politician of Bharatiya Janata Party. In 1980, he was elected to Bihar Legislative Assembly and in 1989, he was elected to 9th Lok Sabha from Patna constituency of Bihar.

He was a delegate at the following conferences:

- 6th World Hindi Conference, London (1999)
- 2nd World Bhojpuri Conference, Port Louis (2000)
- 1st European Hindi Conference, London (2003)
- 7th World Hindi Conference, Suriname (2004)

Shrivastava performed on more than 120 programs for All India Radio broadcast from Patna and Delhi branch, state connected with Doordarshan programs. He contributed hundreds of works in Hindi and English in Germany, the Netherlands, Mauritius and Nepal.

He died on 12 February 2006.

== Biography ==
=== Service ===
- He used to be the professor and head of the department (Hindi) Patna University (retd.31 October 1996).
- He served as the Vice Chancellor of Tilka Manjhi Bhagalpur University, Bhagalpur (1998-1999).
- Member and President of the UGC visiting committee for the Bihar Inter University board (1999-2005)
- Affiliated with National cadet corps NCC and National Service Scheme NSS
- President of Patna University Teachers Association as well as the President of Patna University Employees Union
- President of Lions Club of Patliputra

=== Literary service ===
- Life member of Bhartiya Hindi Parishad (Allahabad)
- Member of Bihar rashtrabhasha Parishad
- Member of Bihar Hindi Pragati samiti
- Member of sansadiya rajbhasha samiti
- Member of Hindi advisory committee of ministry of Health, Water Resources & Kendriya Lok Nirman Vibhag

== Literary works ==
=== Essays ===
- लिफाफा देखकर, Lifafa Dekh kar
- अद्भुत रस और भारतीय काव्य शास्त्र, Adbhut Ras Aur Bhartiya Kavya Shastra
- निराला जीवन और साहित्य, Nirala-Jeevan Aur Sahitya

==== Collections ====
- शिक्षा के नाम पर, Shiksha Ke Naam Par
- बदलते संदर्भों में उच्च शिक्षा, Badalte Sandharbho Mein Uchha Shiksha

=== Poetry anthologies ===
- Shabd Pakke Mann Aanch Ke (2002)
- बहुत दिनों के बाद, Bahut Dino Ke Baad
- आन्दोलन की कविताएं, Aandolan Ki Kavitaein
- कलम उगलती आग, Kalam Ugalti Aag (1999)

=== Biographies ===
- Lok Nayak Jai Prakash Narayan (1968)
- Dr.Shyama Prasad Mukherjee (unpublished)

== Honours and awards ==
- Padma Shri (2003)
- Sahitya Seva Samman (2002)
- Lok Nayak Jaiprakash Samman (2003)
- Dr Harivansh Rai Bachchan Samman (2003)
- Man of The Year-2003 (AMERICA)
- Shad Azimabadi Samman (2004)
- Kayasth Gaurav Samman(2003)
