= Dukhan Ram =

Indian politician

- Born: 15 July 1899; Sasaram, British India
- Died: 16 April 1990 (aged 90); Patna, Bihar, India
- Occupations: Ophthalmologist; Medical academic
- Years active: 1926–1990
- Known for: Medical and general academics
- Children: Six children
- Awards: Padma Bhushan; Rai Sahib

Dukhan Ram (1899–1990) was an Indian ophthalmologist, academic, legislator and the vice chancellor of Babasaheb Bhimrao Ambedkar Bihar University. He was the principal of Patna Medical College, one of the oldest medical colleges in India, and the president of Arya Pradeshik Pratinidhi Sabha, a satellite organization of Arya Samaj, founded by Dayanand Saraswati. He successfully contested the 1962 Bihar Legislative Assembly election from Sasaram constituency, on Indian National Congress candidature and served as the president of All India Ophthalmological Society in 1961. The Government of India awarded him the third highest civilian honour of the Padma Bhushan, in 1962, for his contributions to medical science.

== Early life and education ==
Dukhan Ram was born on 15 July 1899 in a Vaisya family with poor financial means in Sasaram in the Indian state of Bihar and did his early education at local schools in Shahabad district in difficult circumstances as his father died when he was only four. It is reported that his studies were with the help of scholarship as well as the earnings from part-time jobs as a tutor and as a garment peddler during holidays. His marriage took place when he was 16 years of age but he continued his education and joined Calcutta Medical College in 1920 to graduate in medicine from there in 1926, during which time he studied Bachelor of Science course concurrently to pass out in 1925. His medical internship was at Patna Medical College from 1927 after which he did higher studies in Ophthalmology (DLO and DOMS) at the Royal College of Surgeons of London.

== Work ==
Returning to India in 1934, he joined Patna Medical College as a faculty member of the Ophthalmology and otorhinolaryngology department where he rose in ranks to become the professor of the department in 1944. During his tenure there, the institution started four courses, DO, DLO, MS (Eye) and MS (ENT).

Two years before the Indian independence, the British Government awarded Ram the title of Rai Sahib in 1945. He was involved with Arya Samaj and served as the president of the Bihar chapter of the Arya Pratinidhi Sabha in 1951, as the vice president of the national organization in 1956 and presided the International Arya League held in Mauritius in 1957. The same year, he was chosen to operate on Rajendra Prasad, the then President of India. He continued his association with Indian President's office by serving as the honorary ophthalmic surgeon to the next four presidents viz. Sarvepalli Radhakrishnan, Zakir Husain, Varahagiri Venkata Giri and Fakhruddin Ali Ahmed. In 1959, he was appointed as the principal of Patna Medical College and it was during his tenure as the principal, he was selected as the vice chancellor of Babasaheb Bhimrao Ambedkar Bihar University. As the vice chancellor, he was reported to have contributed in the establishment of Rajendra Institute of Medical Sciences, Ranchi as well as the medical colleges in Muzaffarpur and Bhagalpur. When the Government of India set up a Health Survey and Planning Committee for reviewing medical relief and public health services and proposing guidelines, chaired by A. Lakshmanaswami Mudaliar (later known as Mudaliar Committee) in 1959, he was selected as a member of the committee.

Ram was the founder president of the Bihar unit of the All India Ophthalmological Society, chaired the organizing committee of Patna and Jamshedpur annual conferences in 1952 and 1956 respectively and was the national president of the organization in 1961. He presided the 1953 and 1961 national conferences of otorhinolaryngologists and ophthalmologists held in Hyderabad and was the president of Bihar chapter of the Indian Medical Association during 1954–55. He was the founder-president of IASINDIA - Institute of Administrative Studies, a Patna-based institution of higher studies in administration and management. He was one of the founders of the National Academy of Medical Sciences and was its elected fellow (1961). The Government of India awarded him the civilian honor of the Padma Bhushan in 1962. Later, he contested the Bihar Legislative Assembly election of 1962 as an Indian National Congress candidate from Sasaram assembly constituency and won against Bipan Behari Sinha of Praja Socialist Party by a margin of 11984 votes.

Dukhan Ram, whose wife had predeceased him, died on 16 April 1990 in Patna, aged 90 and survived by his six children. A public school in Patna, Dr. Dukhan Ram DAV Public School, has been named after him. The Bihar and Jharkhand State Branch of The Association Of Otorhinolaryngology and Head and Neck Surgeons Of India have instituted an annual oration, Dr. Dukhan Ram Memorial Oration, in his honour.

== See also ==
- 1962 Bihar Legislative Assembly election
- Patna Medical College and Hospital
- A. Lakshmanaswami Mudaliar
