= Prem Pradeep =

Indian politician (born 1932)

Member of Parliament, Lok Sabha
- In office 1989–1991
- Preceded by: Kunwar Ram
- Succeeded by: Prem Chand Ram
- Constituency: Nawada, Bihar

Personal details
- Born: 1932
- Party: Communist Party of India (Marxist)
- Spouse: Malti Devi

Prem Pradeep (born 1932) is an Indian politician. He was elected to the lower House of the Indian Parliament the Lok Sabha from Nawada, Bihar as a member of the Communist Party of India (Marxist).
