= Ram Kripal Yadav =

Indian politician

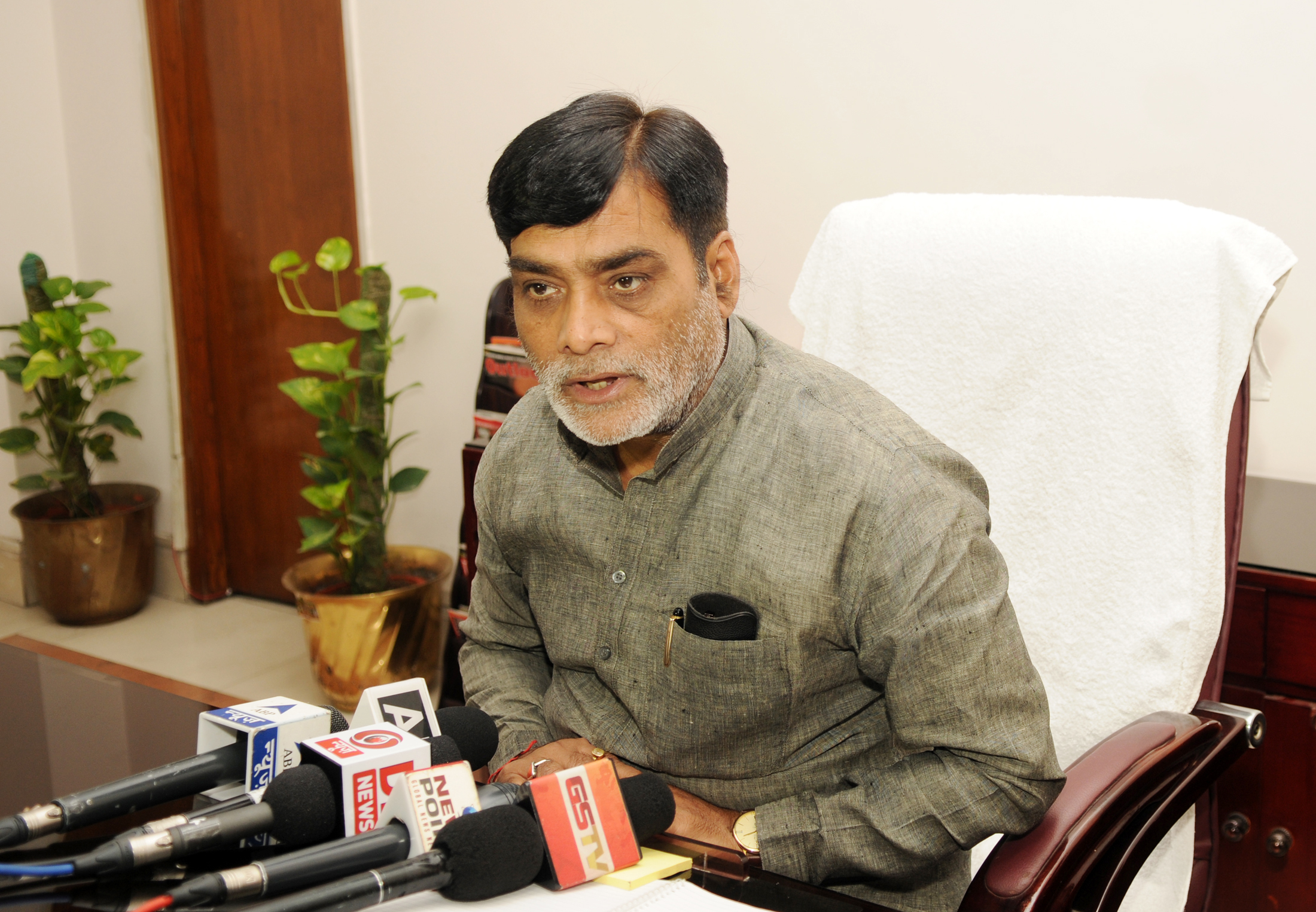
- Yadav in 2016

Minister of Co-operative, Government of Bihar
- Incumbent
- Assumed office 07 May 2026
- Chief Minister: Samrat Choudhary
- Preceded by: Samrat Choudhary

Minister of State Government of India
- In office 9 November 2014 – 30 May 2019
- Ministry: Term
- Minister of Rural Development: 5 July 2016 - 30 May 2019
- Minister of Drinking Water and Sanitation: 9 November 2014 - 5 July 2016

Member of Parliament, Lok Sabha
- In office 2014 – 04 June 2024
- Preceded by: Ranjan Prasad Yadav
- Succeeded by: Misa Bharti
- Constituency: Pataliputra
- In office 2004–2009
- Preceded by: C. P. Thakur
- Succeeded by: Constituency defunct
- Constituency: Patna
- In office 1993–1998
- Preceded by: Shailendra Nath Shrivastava
- Succeeded by: C. P. Thakur
- Constituency: Patna

Member of Bihar Legislative Council
- In office 1998–2004
- In office 1992–1993

Member of Bihar Legislative Assembly
- Incumbent
- Assumed office 14 November 2025
- Constituency: Danapur

Minister of Agriculture Government of Bihar
- In office 20 November 2025 – 15 April 2026
- Chief Minister: Nitish Kumar
- Preceded by: Vijay Kumar Sinha
- Succeeded by: Samrat Choudhary

Member of Parliament, Rajya Sabha
- In office 8 July 2010 – 16 May 2014
- Succeeded by: Sharad Yadav
- Constituency: Bihar

Personal details
- Born: 12 October 1957 (age 69) Patna, Bihar, India
- Party: Bharatiya Janata Party (2014–present)
- Other political affiliations: Rashtriya Janata Dal (until 2014); Janata Dal
- Spouse: Kiran Devi (m. 1983)
- Children: 3
- Education: Magadh University (B.A.[Hons.], LL.B.)

Ram Kripal Yadav (born 12 October 1957) is an Indian politician and a member of the 17th Lok Sabha from the Pataliputra parliamentary constituency in Bihar. He currently serves the Cooperative minister in the Bihar Government since 2026. He represents the Danapur Assembly constituency. He was a member of Rashtriya Janata Dal and was a close confidant of Lalu Yadav. Later he joined Bharatiya Janata Party. He was first a mayor in Bihar, and later the Minister of State for Rural Development in central cabinet in Delhi from 2014 to 2019.

== Early life ==
Yadav was born on 12 October 1957. He attained the Bachelor of Arts (Honours) and Bachelor of Law degrees from Magadh University, Patna.

== Political career ==
Yadav represented the Patna (Lok Sabha constituency) constituency of Bihar winning thrice from there in the year 1991, 1996, and 2004 elections as a member of Rashtriya Janata Dal. He joined BJP in 2014, and has won 2014 and 2019 parliamentary elections as a member of BJP from Pataliputra (Lok Sabha constituency).

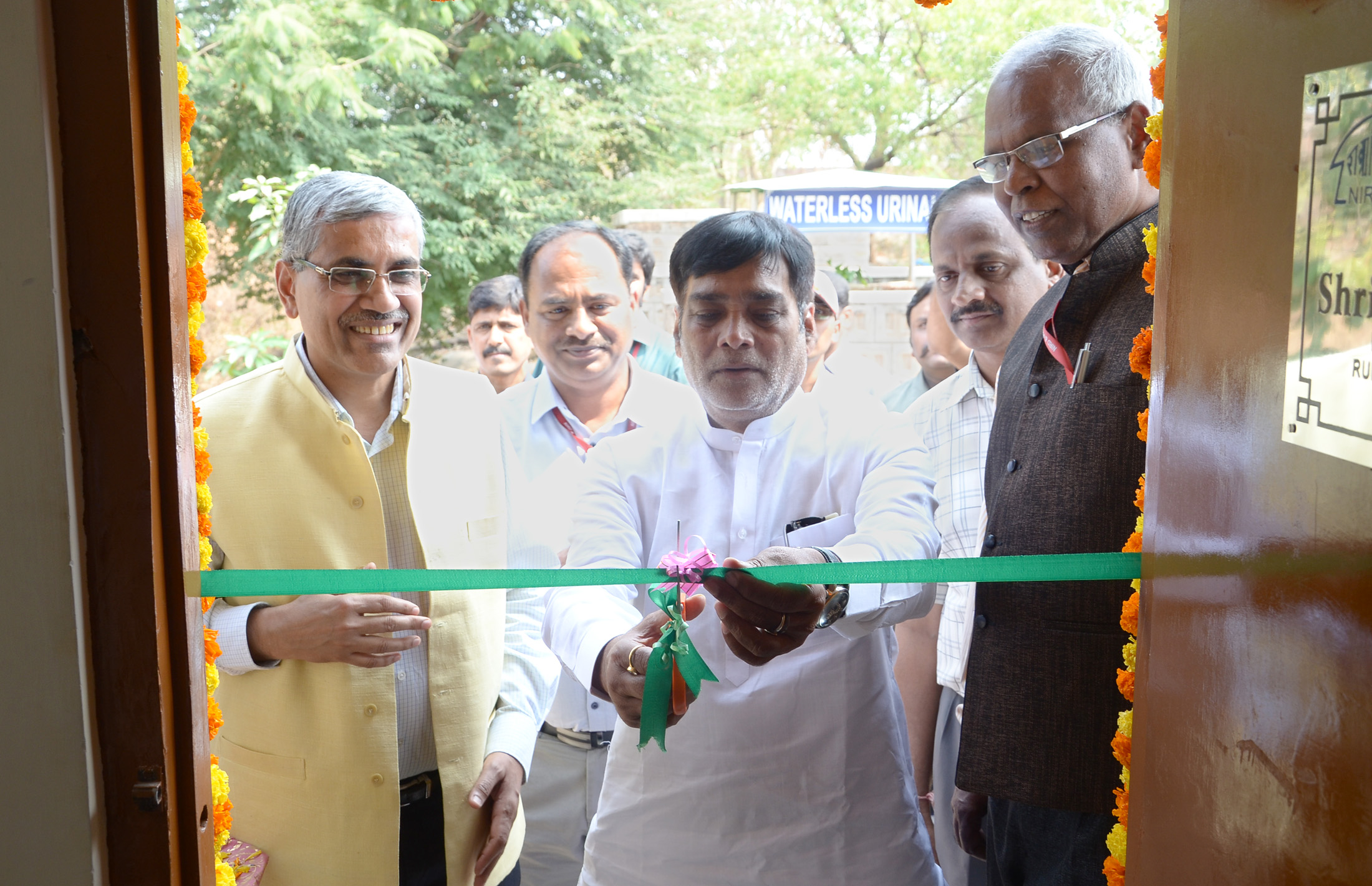
Minister of State for Rural Development, Shri Ram Kripal Yadav inaugurating the International Training Programme on Financing Small Enterprises for Rural Development, at NIRD&PR, Rajendra Nagar, in Hyderabad in 2018

He did not contest the 15th general elections in 2009 from Patna as the RJD leader Lalu Yadav himself contested and lost from that constituency. Ram Kripal Yadav wanted to contest from Pataliputra seat in 2014 but was denied ticket. In March 2014 Ramkripal Yadav resigned from Rashtriya Janata Dal and joined BJP.

He won the Pataliputra Lok Sabha seat in 2014 as a member of BJP after defeating Lalu Yadav's daughter Misa Bharti. He was made a Minister of State in Government of India by Narendra Modi from 2014 to 2019. He retained his Lok Sabha seat in 2019. He was defeated for re-election in 2024.

In 2025 Bihar Assembly elections, he was elected from Danapur Assembly constituency. Subsequently, he was made a minister in the Government of Bihar on 20 November 2025.

== Offices held ==
- 1985-1986 :- Deputy Mayor, Patna Municipal Corporation
- 1992-1993 :- Member, Bihar Legislative Council
- 1993-1996 :- Elected to 10th Lok Sabha (elected in bye election)
- 1996-1997 :- Re-elected to 11th Lok Sabha (2nd term)
- 1998-2004 :- Member, Bihar Legislative Council
- 1998-2005 :- Chairman, Bihar Dharmik Nayas Parishad (Rank equivalent to State Cabinet Minister in Government of Bihar)
- 2004-2009 :- Re-elected to 14th Lok Sabha (3rd term)
  - Member, Standing Committee on Information Technology
  - Member, Committee on Security in Parliament Complex
- 5 August 2007 :- Member, Standing Committee on Petroleum & Natural Gas
- 1 May 2008 :- Member, Committee on Public Undertakings
- 2010 - 16 May 2014 :- Elected to Rajya Sabha
- 2010 :- Member, Committee on Defence
- 2010 :- Member, Consultative Committee for the Ministry of Coal and Ministry of Statistics and Programme Implementation
- Chairman :- Dr. Ambedkar Institute of Sports and Culture, Bihar
- 2014-2019 :- Re-elected to 16th Lok Sabha (4th term)
  - 14 August 2014 - 9 November 2014 :- Member, Committee on Estimates
  - 1 September 2014 - 9 November 2014 :- Member, Standing Committee on Science & Technology, Environment & Forests
  - 1 September 2014 - 9 November 2014 :- Member, Consultative Committee, Ministry of Railways
- 9 November 2014 - 5 July 2016 :- Union Minister of State for Ministry of Drinking Water and Sanitation
- 5 July 2016 - 25 May 2019 :- Union Minister of State for Ministry of Rural Department
- May 2019 :- Re-elected to 17th Lok Sabha (5th term)
- 24 July 2019- 4 June 2024 :- Member, Committee on Public Accounts
- 13 September 2019 - 4 June 2024 :- Member, Standing Committee on Agriculture
- 9 October 2019- 4 June 2024 :- Member, Committee on Subordinate Legislation
- 9 October 2019- 4 June 2024 :- Member, Consultative Committee, Ministry of Petroleum and Natural Gas
- November 2025 - Elected to Bihar Legislative Assembly
- 20 November 2025 – present - State cabinet minister in Bihar Government
