= Vivek Thakur =

Indian politician (born 1969)

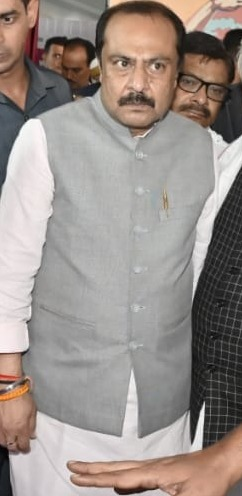

Member of Parliament, Lok Sabha
- Incumbent
- Assumed office 4 June 2024
- Preceded by: Chandan Singh
- Constituency: Nawada, Bihar

Member of Parliament, Rajya Sabha
- In office 10 April 2020 – 4 June 2024
- Preceded by: C. P. Thakur
- Succeeded by: Upendra Kushwaha
- Constituency: Bihar

Member of Bihar Legislative Council
- In office 2 May 2013 – 6 May 2014
- Preceded by: Badshah Prasad Azad
- Constituency: Elected by the MLAs

Personal details
- Born: 27 November 1969 (age 56) Patna, Bihar, India
- Party: Bharatiya Janata Party
- Spouse: Meenakshi Thakur (m. 2000)
- Children: 2 daughters
- Parent: C. P. Thakur (father)
- Education: B.A-LL.B
- Alma mater: Delhi University; Magadh University; Indian Institute of Foreign Trade

Vivek Thakur (born 27 November 1969) is an Indian politician. He was elected to the Rajya Sabha the upper house of Indian Parliament from Bihar as a member of the Bharatiya Janata Party. He was elected as a Member of Parliament, Lok Sabha from Nawada, Bihar in 2024 Indian general election. He is the son of politician C.P. Thakur.

== See also ==
- Kapildeo Singh
