= Sabalpur =

- Village
- Sabalpur has shown within the map of Uttar Pradesh Sabalpur (India)
- Coordinates: 27.176049°N 79.42012°E
- Country: India
- State: Uttar Pradesh
- District: Aligarh

Sabalpur is a village of Aligarh district, Uttar Pradesh in Northern India.
