= C. P. Thakur =

Indian politician

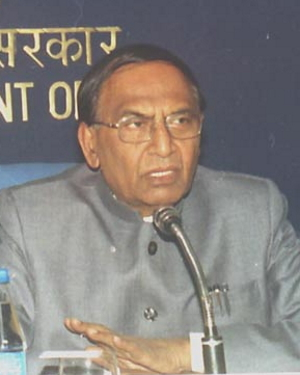

Minister of Small Scale Industries
- In office 29 January 2003 – 22 May 2004
- Prime Minister: Atal Bihari Vajpayee
- Preceded by: Vasundhara Raje
- Succeeded by: Mahaveer Prasad

Minister of Development of North Eastern Region
- In office 29 January 2003 – 22 May 2004
- Prime Minister: Atal Bihari Vajpayee
- Preceded by: Ministry created
- Succeeded by: Paty Ripple Kyndiah

Minister of Health and Family Welfare
- In office 27 May 2000 – 1 July 2002
- Prime Minister: Atal Bihari Vajpayee
- Preceded by: N. T. Shanmugam
- Succeeded by: Shatrughan Sinha

Minister of Water Resources
- In office 22 November 1999 – 27 May 2000
- Prime Minister: Atal Bihari Vajpayee
- Preceded by: Pramod Mahajan
- Succeeded by: Arjun Charan Sethi

Member of Parliament, Rajya Sabha
- In office 10 April 2008 – 9 April 2020
- Preceded by: Shatrughan Sinha
- Succeeded by: Vivek Thakur
- Constituency: Bihar

Member of Parliament, Lok Sabha
- In office 3 March 1998 – 13 May 2004
- Preceded by: Ram Kripal Yadav
- Succeeded by: Ram Kripal Yadav
- Constituency: Patna
- In office 31 December 1984 – 2 December 1989
- Preceded by: Ramavatar Shastri
- Succeeded by: Shailendra Nath Shrivastava
- Constituency: Patna

Personal details
- Born: 21 December 1931 (age 94) Dubaha, Bihar and Orissa Province, British India
- Party: Bharatiya Janata Party
- Spouse: Uma Thakur (m. 1957)
- Children: 4, including Deepak Thakur, Vivek Thakur
- Profession: Politician

Chandreshwar Prasad Thakur (born 3 September 1931) also known as C. P. Thakur, is an Indian physician and politician. He is former member of Rajya Sabha and Lok Sabha, a former minister in the Government of India, and a leader of Bharatiya Janata Party (BJP). He was a cabinet minister from 1999 to 2004 in the BJP government.

He is known for his contribution in finding medication for Kala-azar. He proposed the development of AIIMS hospital Patna in central government and got it approved. One Crossing (Chowk) near AIIMS hospital, Patna has been named "Dr C P Thakur Chowk" in honour of his contribution to Bihar and its people.

== Early life ==
Thakur was born on 3 September 1931 in Dubaha village in a bhumihar family of Muzaffarpur district in Bihar to Radhamohan Thakur and Sharda Thakur. He is a physician and had received the degrees of MBBS, MD, MRCP, FRCP from Patna Medical College, Patna University, Royal College of Physicians, London and Royal College of Physicians, Edinburgh respectively. Thakur married Uma Thakur on 12 June 1957, with whom he has two sons and two daughters. Politician Vivek Thakur is his son.

== Career ==
As a physician, Thakur did extensive research for the treatment of Kala-azar. In 2017, he became the first Indian medical scientist to receive a lifetime achievement award from the World Health Organization.

He was elected to Lok Sabha from Patna constituency in 1984.

== Positions held ==
He has held the following government positions:

- 1984 Elected to Eighth Lok Sabha
- 1990-91 Chairman, Kala-azar Spot Assessment Committee Government of India
- 1990-93 Member, Advisory Committee on Kala-azar Government of India
- 1991 Member, Expert Kala-azar committee to formulate prevention programme for Kala-azar, Government of India
- 1998 Member, Twelfth Lok Sabha (2nd term)
- 1998-99 Member, Committee on Science and Technology, Environment and Forests; and its Sub-Committee on Ganga Action Plan Member, Consultative Committee for the Ministry of External Affairs
- 1999 Member, Thirteenth Lok Sabha (3rd term)
- 22 Nov 1999-26 May 2000 Union Cabinet Minister, Water Resources
- 27 May 2000 – 30 June 2002 Union Cabinet Minister, Health and Family Welfare
- 29 Jan 2003-May 2004 Union Cabinet Minister, Small Scale Industries, Development of North-Eastern Region
- April 2008 Elected to Rajya Sabha from Bihar
- Aug. 2008 onwards Member, Committee on the Empowerment of Women
- Aug. 2008- May 2009 Member, Committee on Information Technology
- May 2009 onwards Member, Court of the Jawaharlal Nehru University
- Aug. 2009 onwards Member, Committee on Chemicals and Fertilizers Member, Consultative Committee for the Ministry of Health and Family Welfare
- Aug. 2012 onwards Member, Committee on Information Technology
- Aug. 2012 onwards Member, Committee on Empowerment of Women
- April 2014 re-elected to Rajya Sabha from Bihar
- Jan. 2016 onwards Chairman, The Scouts/Guides Organisation
- March 2019, he was appointed Chancellor of Central University of South Bihar

== Books published ==
- Dynamics of Development (Editor and Contributor);
- Glimpses of Indian Technology (Co-author);
- World Trade Organization (author);
- Technical Report Series 791 up to 1990 (Geneva) Control of Leishmaniasis (joint author);
- Recent Trends in Leishmania Research (contributor);
- Text Book of Medicine—API Text Book of Medicine (Joint author);
- India Under Atal Bihari Vajpayee, B.J.P. Era .

He has also published more than 100 research papers in medical journals and more than 200 articles in the press.

== Awards ==
- Padma Shri;Padma Bhushan
- Dr. B. C. Roy National Award, Indian Medical Council
- BK Aikat Oration Award, Indian Council of Medical Research;
- P.N. Raju Oration Award (ICMR)
- Lifetime Achievement Award (WHO)

Lok Sabha
Preceded by Ramavatar Shastri	Member of Parliament for Patna; 1984–1989	Succeeded by Shailendra Nath Shrivastava
Preceded by Ram Kripal Yadav	Member of Parliament for Patna; 1998–2004	Succeeded by Ram Kripal Yadav
