= Asian Institute of Medical Sciences =

Geography
- Location: Faridabad, India
- Coordinates: 28.426236°N 77.299951°E

Organisation
- Care system: Private
- Type: Teaching
- Patron: Narendra Kumar Pandey

History
- Founded: 2010

Links
- Website: www.aimsindia.com
- Lists: Hospitals in India

Asian Institute of Medical Sciences is a tertiary referral hospital and medical school located in Faridabad, India. It was established in 2010 and is accredited by NABH and NABL.

The hospital was founded by Padmashri awardee Dr. Narendra Kumar Pandey. He is also the recipient of the Dr. B. C. Roy Award, the highest award in medicine instituted by the Government of India. He was honored for his pioneering work in video-assisted thoracoscopic surgery.

In 2017, the hospital made waves by successfully treating a man who had allegedly swallowed 150 pins and needles.
