= S. N. Arya =

Indian physician

- Born: Bihar, India
- Occupation: Physician
- Awards: Padma Shri; Dr. B. C. Roy Award
- Website: Website

Shyam Narayan Arya is an Indian physician, writer and the former National Professor and dean of the College of General practitioners of the Indian Medical Association (IMA_GP). He has published several medical papers and monographs, has contributed chapters to books published by others and has delivered keynote addresses in many medical conferences. He is an alumnus of the Patna Medical College and Hospital of the Patna University and a Fellow of the Indian Association of Clinical Medicine (IACM), where he has served as its National President. He is a recipient of the Dr. B. C. Roy Award, the highest Indian medical award. The Government of India awarded him the fourth highest civilian honour of the Padma Shri, in 2008, for his contributions to medicine.
