= Kunwar Ram =

Indian politician

Member of Parliament, Lok Sabha
- In office 1980-1989
- Preceded by: Nathuni Ram
- Succeeded by: Prem Pradeep
- Constituency: Nawada, Bihar

Personal details
- Born: 14 January 1928 Chitkohra Village, Patna Sadar, Patna,Bihar, British India
- Party: Indian National Congress
- Spouse: Shanti Devi

Kunwar Ram is an Indian politician. He was elected to the lower House of the Indian Parliament the Lok Sabha from Nawada, Bihar as a member of the Indian National Congress.
