= Malti Devi =

Indian politician

MP
- Constituency: Nawada

Personal details
- Born: 5 August 1968
- Died: 6 September 1999 (aged 31)
- Party: Rashtriya Janata Dal
- Spouse: Bhubaneshwar Prasad
- Profession: Agriculturist, Politician, Social Worker

Malti Devi (5 August 1968 – 6 September 1999) was a political and social worker and a member of parliament elected from the Nawada constituency in the Indian state of Bihar on the Rashtriya Janata Dal party ticket.

== Early life ==
Malti Devi was born on 5 August 1968 in the Manglagori village in Gaya district in the Indian state of Bihar. She was married to Bhubaneshwar Prasad on 4 February 1984 and has two sons. She left her school education in 1980.

== Politics and activism ==
She led the Farmers Movement and was a member of Communist Party of India (Marxist–Leninist). She advocated for women, landless farmers and tribals in central and south Bihar. She left the C.P.I. (ML) in 1995. She was a member of the Bihar Legislative Assembly from 1995 to 1998 and was elected to the 12th Lok Sabha in 1998. She was also a member of Committee on Urban and Rural Development and its Sub-Committee-I on Urban Affairs and Employment and a member of Consultative Committee, Ministry of Health and Family welfare.

== Death ==
Devi died on 6 September 1999 at her Delhi residence due to cancer.
