= Malti Joshi =

Indian writer (1934–2024)

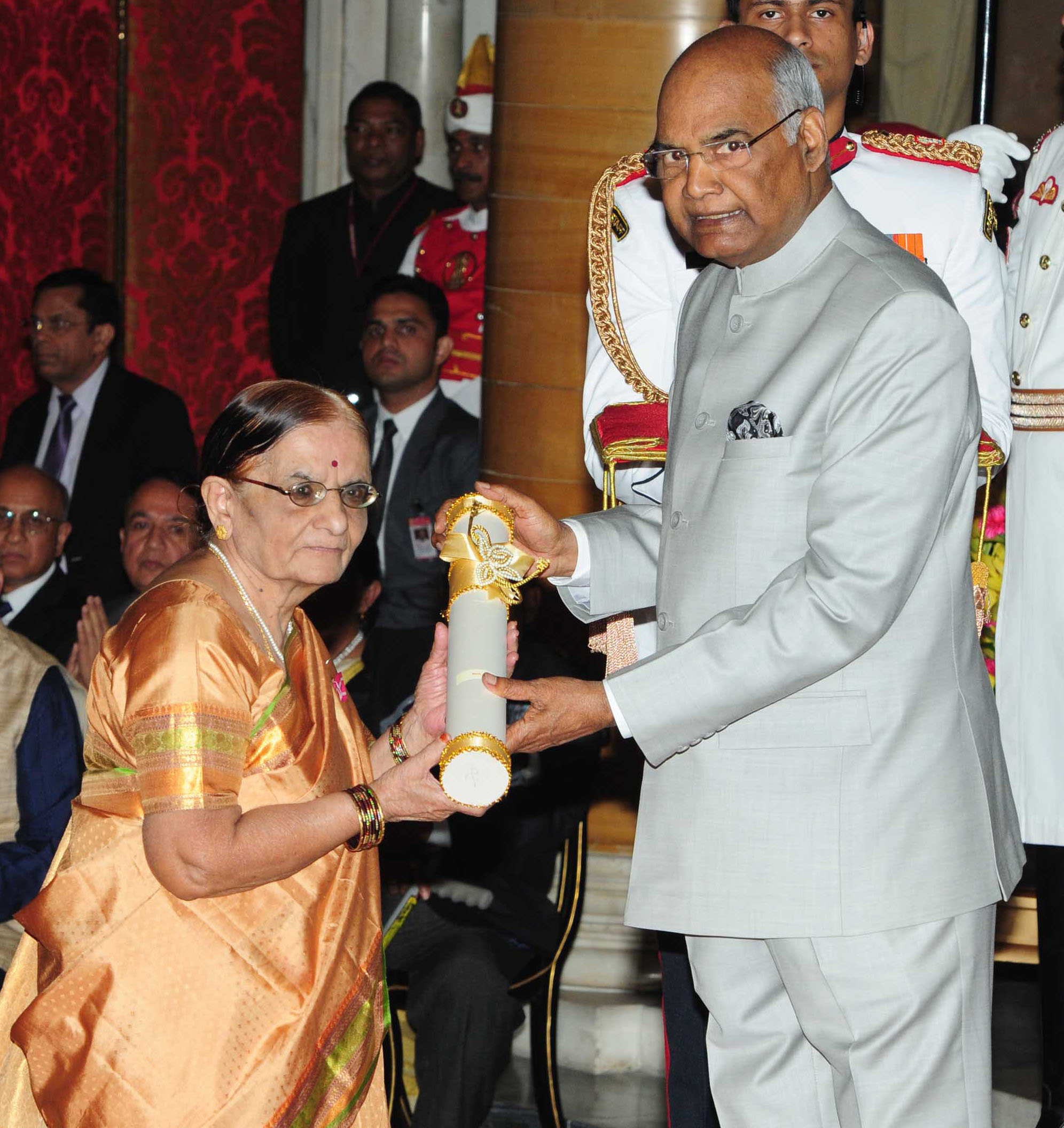
The President of India, Ram Nath Kovind, presenting the Padma Shri to Malti Joshi at the Civil Investiture Ceremony at Rashtrapati Bhavan, New Delhi, on 20 March 2018.

Malti Joshi (4 June 1934 – 15 May 2024) was an Indian novelist, essayist and writer who wrote primarily in the Hindi and Marathi languages. She was awarded the Padma Shri, one of India's highest civilian honours, in 2018.

== Biography ==
Joshi was born in 1934 in Aurangabad, British India. She was educated in Madhya Pradesh and graduated from Holkar College, Devi Ahilya University, Indore. At home, her family spoke Marathi, but she was primarily educated in Hindi. In 1956, she earned a master's degree in Hindi literature.

== Writing ==
Joshi began writing poetry and short stories as a teenager, contributing to Hindi children's magazines such as Parag. In 1971, she published a short story in the Hindi literary magazine Dharmayug, which was then produced by the Times Group. She went on to publish stories in several widely circulated Hindi magazines, including Saptahik Hindustan, Manorama, Kadambini, and Sarika. She also launched the magazine Shubh Sankalp, edited by Dr. Sunita Shrivastava. Joshi engaged in kathakathan, or oral recitation, performing her stories before live audiences. Her works have been collected and published in several volumes, and she also wrote two novels, publishing more than 60 books over the course of her career.

Joshi’s 60-plus Hindi story collections have been translated into Urdu, Bengali, Tamil, Telugu, Punjabi, Malayalam, Kannada, English, Russian, and Japanese, and she has also authored eleven original books in Marathi.

Some of Joshi's stories were later adapted by the Indian government broadcaster, Doordarshan, for television. They featured as part of the television show 'सात फेरे' (Seven Turns) produced by Jaya Bachchan, and 'किरदार' (Character) produced by Gulzar.

In an interview with Aaj Tak, Joshi stated that she drew her characters from her family and social circle, preferring to narrate the experience of middle-class families in India. She cited Amritlal Nagar, P. L. Deshpande, and Sharad Joshi as some of her influences.

== Awards ==
| Year | Award | Awarded by | Source |
|---|---|---|---|
| 1999 | Bhavbhuti Alankaran | Madhya Pradesh Sahitya Sammelan | |
| 2006 | Shikhar Samman | Government of Madhya Pradesh | |
| 2011 | Dushyant Kumar Sahitya Samman | | |
| 2011 | Ojaswini Samman | | |
| 2013-14 | Rashtriya Maithalisharan Gupt Samman | Government of Rajasthan | |
| 2013 | Vanmali Katha Samman | The Foundation for Vanmali Jagannath Prasad Chaubey | |
| 2016 | Kamleshwar Smruti Puraskar | Kathabimb (literary magazine) | |
| 2018 | Padma Shri for contributions to literature & education | The President of India | |
| 2018 2 | Hindi Sevi Samman | Mahatma Gandhi International Hindi University | |
