= List of villages in Gaya district =

The Gaya district of Bihar, India is for administration and governance purposes divided into four sub-divisions and 24 blocks. Each block has between 8 and 23 Panchayat and each panchayat may comprise a number of villages. Gaya district has approximately 3000 villages.

== Gaya Town C.D. Block ==
Gaya Town C. D. Block consists of:

- Gaya Municipal Corporation
- Paharpur Census Town

and the following villages:

1. Agraili
2. Agraili
3. Amraha
4. Aradih
5. Aurawan
6. Bahadur Bigha
7. Bahbalpur
8. Balna
9. Bara
10. Basatpur
11. Bazidpur
12. Belthu
13. Bemata
14. Bhikhanpur
15. Bishunganj
16. Bitho
17. Chakand
18. Chamardih
19. Chamardih
20. Channa
21. Charowa
22. Chatarghat
23. Chaurahar
24. Chhattu Badh
25. Chiraiatanr
26. Churi
27. Dabbo
28. Deguna
29. Dhakain
30. Dhansir
31. Dubahal
32. Dumra
33. Durbe
34. Gangapur
35. Gannu Bigha
36. Ghazipur
37. Ghuthia
38. Gulni
39. Gulni
40. Hario
41. Hasanpur
42. Inglish
43. Jagarnathpur
44. Kaladaspur
45. Kandi
46. Kasma
47. Katahri
48. Kesru Dharampur
49. Kewali
50. Khiriyawan
51. Khurar
52. Kirit Nawada
53. Korwan
54. Kujap
55. Kujapi
56. Kumar Bigha
57. Kusarhi
58. Kusdihra
59. Kusmha
60. Lakhno
61. Mandanbigha
62. Mandaul
63. Molwi chak
64. Murkatta
65. Naili
66. Nasirpur
67. Naugarh
68. Neazipur
69. Nima
70. Paharpur
71. Panchu Bigha
72. Parsanwan
73. Pathraura
74. Pir Bigha
75. Qazi chak
76. Ranapur
77. Rasalpur
78. Sadipur
79. Shahbazpur
80. Sherpur
81. Sherpur
82. Siarbhuka
83. Takeya
84. Uda Bigha
85. Utraundh

== Amas ==
The Amas block consists of 97 villages:

1. Ahuri
2. Alahua Chak
3. Alwadi Chak
4. Amas
5. Babhandih
6. Bahera Khurd
7. Baida
8. Bair Bigha
9. Baliyari
10. Balkhora
11. Banahi
12. Bankat
13. Bara
14. Barahkurwa
15. BarkaBahera
16. Barki Chilmi
17. Barki Sawo
18. Barua
19. Bazidpur
20. Bhatbigha
21. Bindraban
22. Bishunpur
23. Budhaul
24. Chaprdah
25. Chature Khap
26. Chhotka Bahera
27. Chhotki Chilmi
28. Chhotki Sawon
29. Chitab Khurd
30. Darna
31. Dharampur
32. Dhibra
33. Dolaha Kalan
34. Dolaha Khurd
35. Ekauna
36. Gamhariya
37. Gangti
38. Gobardhanpur
39. Gopala
40. Hamzapur
41. Hardaspur
42. Jairam Khap
43. Jaspur
44. Jewainia
45. Jhari
46. Kalwan
47. Karamdih
48. Khaira
49. Khaira Khurd
50. Khaira Pokhar
51. Kolsanr
52. Komal Khap
53. Kurasin
54. Kurmain
55. Kurmathu
56. Lemua
57. Madanpur
58. Mahapur
59. Mahuawan
60. Majhaulia
61. Majhaulia
62. Majhaulia
63. Majhila
64. Mircha
65. Molna Chak
66. Mugrain
67. Murainiya
68. Narayanpur
69. Naudiha
70. Naugarh
71. Niman
72. Niman
73. Nonia Chak
74. Paharpur
75. Paharpur
76. Paranpur
77. Patej
78. Pathra
79. Pindara
80. Pindari
81. Purkhotimpur
82. Rajpur
83. Rampur
84. Ramuan Chak
85. Reganian
86. Semarhat
87. Shamsher Khap
88. Shekh Bigha
89. Sihuli
90. Simri
91. Suggi
92. Supai
93. Taradih
94. Tetaria
95. Tetaria
96. Tetaria
97. Tilaia
98. Tinkoni

== Atri ==
The Atri block consists of 54 villages:

1. Asarhia
2. Bahorma
3. Banchar
4. Banwan Goshain Math
5. Bara
6. Bara
7. Barbana
8. Barika
9. Bedpura
10. Belsanr
11. Bhithra
12. Bhojpur
13. Birnoi
14. Chakra
15. Chehal Mundera
16. Chiriawan
17. Daulatpur
18. Dhusri
19. Dihuri
20. Gangati
21. Gaus Chak
22. Habibullahpur
23. Hilkhor
24. Jehli Bigha
25. Jiri
26. Karjani
27. Kataiya
28. Katalpura
29. Khamri
30. Khiri
31. Kolhuara
32. Mahammadpur
33. Mapha
34. Misir Bigha
35. Murau Bigha
36. Nanhu Bigha
37. Narawat
38. Nauranga
39. Pali
40. Parsa
41. Pathari
42. Pathraura
43. Piar
44. Punar
45. Ramdana
46. Sahora
47. Shahpur Matiyo
48. Sinr
49. Tajparsa
50. Taunsa
51. Taunsi
52. Titmo
53. Titua
54. Upthu

== Banke Bazar ==
The Banke Bazar block consists of 96 villages:

1. Ammakhar
2. Anjan
3. Asurain
4. Azamgarh
5. Bahak
6. Baida Saida
7. Bairi Banbas
8. Baital
9. Balaset
10. Balsot
11. Bara
12. Barahmoria
13. Baramh Chak
14. Baratanr
15. Barheta
16. Bazidpur
17. Bela
18. Bhaluhar
19. Bihargain
20. Bikopur Cherwar
21. Bishunpur
22. Chandpur
23. Chaugain
24. Delaho
25. Dhakan Chuan
26. Dhamnian
27. Dhanheta
28. Dheuri
29. Dholi
30. Dighasin
31. Diguriya
32. Dongila
33. Duari
34. Dumranwan
35. Dumri
36. Fatehpur
37. Genjana
38. Geyan Khap
39. Goitha
40. Harankel
41. Hardia
42. Hasanpur
43. Itawan
44. Jalalpur
45. Jamuara Kalan
46. Jamuara Khurd
47. Jondhi
48. Juri
49. Kamalpur
50. Karchoi
51. Khaira
52. Khajuriya
53. Khapraundh
54. Kharanti
55. Kharar
56. Koiri Bigha
57. Kothilwa
58. Kubri
59. Kulfat
60. Kumbhi
61. Kumbhi
62. Kundil
63. Lemuia
64. Lutua
65. Madarpur
66. Majhaulia
67. Majuri Kalan
68. Majuri Khurd
69. Mangura Chak
70. Manka
71. Morainian
72. Nagobar
73. Naua Khap
74. Nauhar
75. Nawada
76. Nawadih
77. Pachma
78. Pananian
79. Parsa Chuan
80. Parsawan Kalan
81. Parsawan Khurd
82. Raksi
83. Roshanganj
84. Sagdiha
85. Saifganj
86. Shakarpur
87. Siddhikhap
88. Simrehat
89. Singhpur
90. Sirsa
91. Sondaha
92. Tanrawa
93. Taradih
94. Tarwan
95. Tilaiya
96. Uchala

== Barachatti ==
The Barachatti block consists of 141 villages:

1. Adalpur
2. Amukhap
3. Bahargara
4. Bajarkar
5. Balthar
6. Bank
7. Bank
8. Bara
9. Barandih
10. Barawadih
11. Barki Chanpi
12. Barsuddi
13. Batasi
14. Bela
15. Bela
16. Belghoghar
17. Belhariya
18. Belkhara
19. Beri
20. Bhadeya
21. Bhagahar
22. Bhagauti
23. Bhalua Chatti
24. Bhanrari
25. Bhat Bigha
26. Bheriya
27. Bhitiahi
28. Bibipesra
29. Bighi
30. Binda
31. Bishunpur
32. Bodha Bigha
33. Bumer
34. Chainpur
35. Chaithia
36. Chando
37. Chaunria
38. Chhaura Bandh
39. Chhotki Chanpi
40. Chordaha
41. Dahiyar
42. Dang
43. Darbar
44. Deat
45. Deuri Dumri
46. Dewanian
47. Dhamna
48. Dhana Chak
49. Dhanawan
50. Dhanawan
51. Dhanganin
52. Dharamthan
53. Dhirja Bigha
54. Dihdanri
55. Duari
56. Dumri
57. Etwan
58. Gajragarh
59. Gangti
60. Gangwar
61. Ghur Sari
62. Gobaria
63. Gohi
64. Goshain Pesra
65. Gular Bed
66. Hahesanri
67. Haraia
68. Harnahi
69. Jahangira
70. Jaigir
71. Jhajh
72. Kadal
73. Kahudag
74. Kalaua Kalan
75. Kalaua Khurd
76. Karman
77. Karman
78. Kathautia
79. Kendua
80. Khaira
81. Khajurain
82. Kohbari
83. Konia
84. Kumbhi
85. Kundil
86. Lat
87. Latkuta
88. Mahugain
89. Majhauli
90. Makhdumpur
91. Manan Bigha
92. Mani Chak
93. Mankumhari
94. Mayapur
95. Murhi
96. Nare
97. Nauagardan
98. Nawadih
99. Padam Chak
100. Paili
101. Pakariya
102. Panrea
103. Parariya
104. Partapi
105. Patiauna
106. Patluka
107. Phuguniyan
108. Piprahi
109. Pokhariya
110. Purni Dhanganin
111. Raksi
112. Ratna Chak
113. Rebda
114. Rohi
115. Sabalpur
116. Sahbazpur
117. Sakhauwan
118. Sakhwa
119. Salempur
120. Sarwan Khas
121. Sarwan Khurd
122. Selari
123. Sewai
124. Sisiatari Salot
125. Sobh
126. Sokhea
127. Somea
128. Sonbarsa
129. Sondiha
130. Sonhi Jamjor
131. Sulebata
132. Sundar Shahi
133. Suraundha
134. Tetaria
135. Tetariya
136. Tetariya Khurd
137. Tikaiti
138. Tilaiya Kalan
139. Tilaiya Khurd
140. Tile Tanr
141. Tula Chak

== Belaganj ==
The Belaganj block consists of 113 villages:

1. Aganda
2. Agni
3. Alawalpur
4. Alam Bigha
5. Amar Bigha
6. Amjhar
7. Ashrafpur
8. Bahbalpur
9. Bajpura
10. Balapur
11. Bansi Bigha
12. Baraini
13. Barhai Bigha
14. Bazidpur
15. Bela
16. Belarhi
17. Beldar Bigha
18. Bhagwanpur
19. Bhalua
20. Bhalua
21. Bheriya
22. Bhimdaspur
23. Birahpura
24. Bithraura
25. Chandauli
26. Charhata Aghatpur
27. Chiraila
28. Churihara Bigha
29. Dadpur
30. Darampur
31. Darhwa
32. Dariyapur
33. Daulatpur
34. Deva Bigha
35. Dhanawan
36. Dharahra
37. Dharmagatpur
38. Diha
39. Fatehpur
40. Fatehpur
41. Fatehpur
42. Gaharpur
43. Gangti
44. Gobraha
45. Hargawan
46. Hasanpur
47. Irki
48. Isapur
49. Jadopur
50. Jafra
51. Kab Bigha
52. Kabirpur
53. Kachanpur Agthu
54. Kachnawan
55. Kamalpur
56. Kazipur
57. Khaneta
58. Kharagpur
59. Koiri Bigha
60. Koriyawan
61. Kormathu
62. Kuri Saray
63. Lachhmipur
64. Lodipur
65. Mahammadpur
66. Makhdumpur
67. Maksudpur
68. Manikpur
69. Manjhar
70. Men
71. Mobarakpur
72. Murgawan
73. Nandu Bigha
74. Narwan
75. Niamatpur
76. Nim Chak
77. Or
78. Pai Bigha
79. Pali
80. Panari
81. Panda Bigha
82. Paranpur
83. Pararia
84. Pathra
85. Pem Bigha
86. Pipra
87. Raili
88. Ramanand Bigha
89. Rauna
90. Rewara
91. Risaudh
92. Salehpur
93. Salempur
94. Salempur
95. Samaspur
96. Shahbazpur
97. Shahmohammadpur
98. Shahpur
99. Shakir Bigha
100. Shankarpur
101. Shekhpura
102. Shekhpura Khurd
103. Shekhpura Nehalpur
104. Shiwrampur
105. Silaunja
106. Simra
107. Sindani
108. Singhaul
109. Siripur
110. Sonpur
111. Tikuli
112. Turi
113. Uje

== Bodh Gaya ==
The Bodh Gaya block consists of the Bodh Gaya Nagar Panchayat and 132 villages.

1. Adham Khap
2. Agani
3. Amar Bigha
4. Antiya
5. Arjun Bigha
6. Asni
7. Atiya
8. Aunra
9. Babhni
10. Bagahi Khurd
11. Bagdaha
12. Bagha Khap
13. Bairi chak
14. Bajraha
15. Bakraur
16. Banarsi Bigha
17. Bara
18. Baraini
19. Barawan
20. Basari
21. Bataspur
22. Bela Dih
23. Bhaiya Bigha
24. Bhalua
25. Bhanwarbar
26. Bhusia
27. Birhut
28. Budhaul
29. Chhanchh
30. Dadpur
31. Dhanawan
32. Dhanawan
33. Dhandhawa
34. Diprahiya
35. Dirawan
36. Dulra
37. Dumri
38. Dumri
39. Ehiyapur
40. Gangahar
41. Gapha Kalan
42. Gapha Khurd
43. Gean Khap
44. Ghogharia
45. Gohati
46. Gortorwa
47. Gothu
48. Guri
49. Harli Kalan
50. Harli Khurd
51. Hathiar
52. Ilhara
53. Inguna
54. Intara
55. Jahan Bigha
56. Jamari
57. Jani Bigha
58. Jarahara
59. Jhikatiya
60. Jindapur
61. Jodhpur
62. Kachanpur
63. Kanhaul
64. Karman Dhab
65. Kazi chak
66. Kewal
67. Khaira Bara
68. Khajawati
69. Khap
70. Kharanti
71. Kharanti
72. Kharauna
73. Kishunpur Jarhari
74. Kolhaura
75. Kolkha
76. Koshila
77. Kurmawan
78. Kurum Dih
79. Larpur
80. Lohara chapri
81. Mahuet
82. Mahurar
83. Majhauli
84. Manik chak
85. Mankosi
86. Matihani
87. Mirchehar
88. Mobarakpur
89. Mocharim
90. Mohimapur
91. Mora Mardana
92. Moratal
93. Moti chak
94. Motiya chak
95. Musatpura
96. Nanwan
97. Narkatiya
98. Naudiha
99. Nawan
100. Nimahar
101. Niman
102. Niskha
103. Paner
104. Panrariya
105. Parahnda
106. Parariya
107. Parewa
108. Parsa Kalan
109. Parsawan
110. Parsawan
111. Pathalgarh
112. Pathra
113. Rasulganj
114. Ratnara Ganga Bigha
115. Sahade Khap
116. Sahdew Khap
117. Sahnu
118. Saidpur
119. Sekhwara
120. Sewa Bigha
121. Shekha Bigha
122. Shivrajpur
123. Sijua
124. Silaunja
125. Sirisani chak
126. Sobha Bigha
127. Sobha khap
128. Tetuia
129. Tikuna
130. Tirkha
131. Turi Buzurg
132. Turi Khurd

== Dobhi ==
The Dobhi block consists of 118 villages:

1. Achhwan
2. Aganda
3. Amarua
4. Amarut
5. Angra
6. Anuradhi
7. Anwara dohar
8. Aunrwadohar
9. Babhandewa
10. Bagsoti
11. Bahera
12. Bahera Bhurkunda
13. Bahera Dih
14. Bajaura
15. Banwara
16. Bariya
17. Barmoriya
18. Bedauli
19. Bhadwar
20. Bhaluwa
21. Bharhar
22. Bhelwa
23. Bishunpur
24. Bunda Bigha
25. Chanda
26. Dariaura
27. Daudpur
28. Despura
29. Dhab
30. Dharampur
31. Dharampur
32. Dobhi
33. Donchuan
34. Dumri
35. Ekauni
36. Fatehpur
37. Gamhariya
38. Gamhariya
39. Ganesh Chak
40. Gangi
41. Garhi Jan
42. Garwaiya
43. Ghazi Chak
44. Ghir Sindi Kalan
45. GHir Sindi Khurd
46. Ghonghawa
47. Ghoraghat
48. Ghorwadih
49. Gobardiha
50. Gointha Mittha
51. Habibpur
52. Hardawan
53. Inborwa
54. Jaimangalpur
55. Jingura
56. Jodha Bigha
57. Kajiar
58. Kaleyanpur
59. Kangali Bigha
60. Karamthan
61. Karan Bigha
62. Karmauni
63. Kauabar
64. Kesapi
65. Keshauriya
66. Khapiya
67. Kharanti
68. Kharne
69. Kothwara
70. Kundilwa
71. Kurmawan
72. Kurumdih
73. Kusabija
74. Kusmha
75. Lahuari
76. Lemogara
77. Mahuari
78. Majuri
79. Makhraur
80. Mangru Chak
81. Manhkar
82. Maraha
83. Masaundha
84. Mittu Chak
85. Munrial
86. Musehna
87. Musehni
88. Nadarpur
89. Nain Sagar
90. Nakateya
91. Nanhu Bigha
92. Nawadih
93. Nehuta
94. Nigri
95. Nima
96. Pachamba
97. Pachratan
98. Parri
99. Patak Bigha
100. Patti
101. Pindara
102. Pinrasin
103. Piparghatti
104. Rampur
105. Rani Chak
106. Ratni
107. Sabal Bigha
108. Salempur
109. Sewai Chak
110. Singh Pokhar
111. Sita Chak
112. Sonbarsa
113. Sugasot
114. Sundar Kumhari
115. Surajmandal
116. Tetariya Kalan
117. Wari
118. Warman

== Dumaria ==
The Dumaria block consists of 111 villages:

1. Adar
2. Amma Bar
3. Anarbansalea
4. Baghpur
5. Bahadurpur
6. Bakri
7. Balia
8. Balsora
9. Baraha
10. Barka Dhab
11. Barwadih
12. Barwadih
13. Basdiha
14. Bataspur
15. Bela
16. Beni Nagar
17. Bhadwar
18. Bhangia
19. Bhokaha
20. Bijhua
21. Bikua Kalan
22. Bikua Khurd
23. Bishunpur
24. Bodhi Bigha
25. Burha Burhi
26. Chahra Pahra
27. Chanariya
28. Chhakarbandha
29. Chhatarpur
30. Chhotka Dhab
31. Chhotka Kewla
32. Chonha
33. Deuri
34. Dibhka
35. Dubat
36. Dumaria
37. Gansha
38. Goti Bandh
39. Hariobara
40. Harni
41. Hurmeth
42. Jagat Khap
43. Jagatpur
44. Jhangat
45. Kabisa
46. Kachar
47. Karhanni
48. Karman
49. Kathautia
50. Kewla Kalan
51. Khaira
52. Khardag
53. Kokna
54. Kolhubar
55. Kolsaita
56. Kundari
57. Kunria
58. Kusari
59. Lataha
60. Londa
61. Madarpur
62. Mahjari
63. Mahuri
64. Mahuri
65. Maigara
66. Majhauli
67. Majhgawan
68. Manrar
69. Mataha
70. Maun Bar
71. Mayapur
72. Milki
73. Nabigarh
74. Nagahari
75. Nanai
76. Narayanpur
77. Nonisat
78. Pachmah
79. Pakharpur
80. Pankara
81. Pathra
82. Patkhaulia
83. Phulwaria
84. Piparwar
85. Pipra
86. Purkhan Chak
87. Rabda
88. Rabdi
89. Rachhia
90. Rajbalia
91. Ramdohar
92. Rampur
93. Rampur
94. Saita
95. Salaiya
96. Salaiya
97. Sendwaria
98. Sewra
99. Sidhpur
100. Sihauta
101. Sildilia
102. Simari
103. Simri
104. Singh Pur
105. Sonpura
106. Sujji Kalan
107. Sujji Khurd
108. Tanrwa
109. Tekra Kalan
110. Tekra Khurd
111. Wali Chak

== Fatehpur ==
The Fatehpur block consists of 158 villages:

1. Aiwan
2. Alakdiha
3. Alawalpur
4. Amaur
5. Amin
6. Badauan
7. Bagai
8. Bagodar
9. Bahera
10. Bajda
11. Bakhari
12. Bakhtawarpur
13. Banra
14. Bara
15. Barahuria
16. Bargawan
17. Bargawan
18. Barkail
19. Barua
20. Basariya
21. Baskotwa
22. Bela
23. Bhalua
24. Bhaluani
25. Bhare
26. Bhawanri Kalan
27. Bhawanri Khurd
28. Bhenrwa
29. Bodar Ghorsari
30. Bordi
31. Budhaul
32. Chamru Chak
33. Chapri
34. Chargharwa
35. Charokhari
36. Chhiri
37. Chhotahra
38. Chonrhi
39. Dadpur
40. Dala
41. Dangra
42. Darha
43. Dehuri
44. Dhanchhu
45. Dhangawan
46. Dhanheta
47. Dharahara Kalan
48. Dharahara Khurd
49. Dharampur
50. Dhuba
51. Dibo Basehra
52. Donaiya
53. Dumri
54. Dumri
55. Dumri Chatti
56. Dundu
57. Ekamman
58. Fatehpur
59. Gajhanda
60. Gajhandi
61. Gamhri
62. Gangahar Hardia
63. Gangahar Mansuri
64. Gani Pipra
65. Gobardaha
66. Gohra
67. Goli
68. Gopal Kera
69. Gumman
70. Guri
71. Halmatta
72. Hara Kuraha
73. Hematpur
74. Incha
75. Isarwe
76. Itwan
77. Jaipur
78. Jamhaita
79. Jamuhar
80. Jaspur
81. Jhurang
82. Kabilpur
83. Kalyanpur
84. Kanti
85. Karma
86. Karri
87. Kathautiya Kewal
88. Kathian
89. Kendua
90. Ketra
91. Khaira
92. Khajuri
93. Khedarpura
94. Khutkat
95. Kothar
96. Kuhri
97. Kurumdih
98. Kusmhar
99. Lodhwe
100. Majhauli
101. Majhauli
102. Majhganwan
103. Majhila Kalan
104. Majhla
105. Manhonna
106. Mani Chak
107. Manpur
108. Mataso
109. Mayapur
110. Meari
111. Meharpur
112. Mocharakh
113. Morahe
114. Nagwa
115. Nagwan
116. Naudiha
117. Naudiha
118. Neyamatpur
119. Nimi
120. Paharpur
121. Pakri
122. Partappur
123. Pateya
124. Patwans
125. Pharka
126. Pinrari
127. Pinriya
128. Pipra
129. Pipra
130. Poa
131. Raghopur
132. Raghunathpur
133. Raisir
134. Raja Bigha
135. Rajaundha
136. Raksi
137. Rato Kalan
138. Rato Khurd
139. Rengaini
140. Rosana
141. Rui Dhamna
142. Rupin
143. Sabdo
144. Sahpokhar
145. Salaia Kalan
146. Salaia Khurd
147. Sarne
148. Sataniyan
149. Saunru Bhaunra
150. Sikri
151. Simariya
152. Sohjana
153. Sultanpur
154. Tapsa
155. Taro
156. Tengaini
157. Tetaria
158. Tetaria

== Guraru ==
The Guraru block consists of the census town Bara and the following 74 villages:

1. Amwan
2. Anantpur
3. Asani
4. Bagdiha
5. Bahabalpur
6. Bahera
7. Balia
8. Banara
9. Banaul
10. Barorah
11. Barwan
12. Bathani
13. Bela
14. Bhimpur
15. Budhpur
16. Dabur
17. Dadhapa
18. Dadnapur
19. Daulatpur Bariawan
20. Dewa Kali
21. Diha
22. Dumra Ismailpur
23. Gangati
24. Ghatera
25. Guraru
26. Indil
27. Itahri'
28. Itwan
29. Jamalpur
30. Kajraila
31. Kanausi Belkhara
32. Karma
33. Kekara
34. Kerki
35. Kolhea
36. Konchi
37. Koriauna
38. Mahadewpur
39. Mahadipur
40. Mahimapur
41. Mahuain
42. Majhiawan
43. Makhu Khap
44. Malpa
45. Mangrawan
46. Maraha
47. Mathurapur
48. Mirdadpur
49. Mithapur
50. Mohammadpur
51. Paharpur
52. Pahra
53. Palaki Sultani
54. Palanki Sakhi
55. Pananiyan
56. Parsohada
57. Pathra
58. Phanphar
59. Ranapur
60. Rasalpur
61. Rasanpur
62. Rauda
63. Rauna
64. Rukunpur
65. Sadopur
66. Sarewa
67. Serpur
68. Sijalpur
69. Sikandarchak
70. Sondiha
71. Tanti
72. Taraunchi
73. Tilori
74. Tineri

== Gurua ==
The Gurua block consists of the following 170 villages:

1. Aila
2. Akori Khap
3. Akothara
4. Amarpur
5. Arsi Kalan
6. Arsi Khurd
7. Atopur
8. Aunradih
9. Baida
10. Baidpura
11. Baiju Bigha
12. Balganwan
13. Bara
14. Bara
15. Barahi Bigha
16. Barhauna
17. Barma
18. Bazid Chak
19. Bazidpur
20. Bela
21. Bela
22. Beni Bigha
23. Beniya
24. Bhaluhar
25. Bharaundha
26. Bharthipur
27. Bhindis
28. Bilauti
29. Birahma
30. Bishunpur
31. Budhua Chak
32. Budhuwa
33. Chak
34. Chalhopur
35. Chando Khara
36. Chansi
37. Cheni
38. Chhachhu Bigha
39. Chilaur
40. Chiraili
41. Chunuk Bigha
42. Dadu Barma
43. Dariaura
44. Daulatpur
45. Deal Chak
46. Deuria
47. Dhamaul
48. Dhibra
49. Dhobi Chak
50. Dhokra
51. Domiyan
52. Duba
53. Dubi
54. Dumri
55. Erur
56. Fatua Chak
57. Gamharia
58. Ghauspur
59. Gonra
60. Gulni
61. Guneri
62. Guraru
63. Gurbhat
64. Gurua
65. Habibpur
66. Harnarayanpur
67. Hasanpur
68. Ismailpur
69. Itahri
70. Itawa
71. Itawa
72. Jagarnathpur
73. Jai Bigha
74. Jaipur
75. Jalpa
76. Jalpa Chak
77. Jharaha
78. Jharaha
79. Jhikatiya
80. Jolah Bigha
81. Kajh
82. Kanaudi
83. Kartahi
84. Kasla
85. Kathautiya
86. Kathwara
87. Kauriya
88. Kendua
89. Keturi
90. Khairi
91. Khairi Taira
92. Khutaha
93. Koiri Bigha
94. Kulauna
95. Lakrahi
96. Loki Khap
97. Mahadewpur
98. Mahadewpur
99. Mahamadpur
100. Majhar
101. Makhdumpur
102. Manda
103. Mangli Chak
104. Matua
105. Mir Chak
106. Misri Chak
107. Morahar
108. Murahi
109. Nadaura
110. Nadiain
111. Nadiawan
112. Nagwan
113. Nariahi
114. Naser
115. Naudiha
116. Nauwa Khap
117. Nema Bigha
118. Nima
119. Nurpur Raje Khap
120. Pachmah
121. Pakri
122. Panaul
123. Parsawan
124. Parsawan Kalan
125. Paruhara
126. Patak Bigha
127. Patar Bigha
128. Pawara
129. Pendapur
130. Phesara
131. Phulsathar
132. Phulwaria
133. Piprahi
134. Pirwa
135. Raghunath Khap
136. Rajan
137. Raksa
138. Rama Bigha
139. Ramnagar
140. Rampur
141. Rasulpur
142. Rupan chak
143. Sagahi
144. Sakal Bigha
145. Salaipura
146. Salempur
147. Samaspur
148. Samda
149. Sarai Tanr
150. Saraia
151. Sekhu Bigha
152. Semaru
153. Seni Chak
154. Shahchand Bigha
155. Sharafuddinpur
156. Sherpur
157. Shukul Khap
158. Siram Bigha
159. Sonathu
160. Sonbarsa
161. Sugaris
162. Tamarua
163. Tanrai
164. Tanrwa
165. Tarapur
166. Taroa
167. Tarwan
168. Tetaria
169. Thekaha
170. Usewa

== Imamganj ==
The Imamganj block consists of the following 184 villages:

1. Adman
2. Akauni
3. Alinagar
4. Amauna
5. Amauni
6. Babhandih
7. Bagahi
8. Bage Bar
9. Bagea
10. Baghauta
11. Baha
12. Bahera
13. Bahera
14. Bahuara
15. Bansi
16. Bara
17. Bara
18. Bara
19. Baraheta
20. Bardih
21. Barhai Khap
22. Barhai Khap
23. Bark Karasan
24. Baseta
25. Baseta
26. Basura
27. Bataspur
28. Bedauli
29. Bela
30. Bela
31. Belwar
32. Benga Dohar
33. Bhat Bigha
34. Bhatbigha
35. Bhaunr
36. Bhaunraha
37. Bhiraha
38. Bhogtadih
39. Biddhi Chak
40. Bidia Chak
41. Bikopur
42. Binayka
43. Binhua
44. Biraj
45. Bisrampur
46. Chandana Chak
47. Chapara
48. Chapri
49. Chapri
50. Chau Bar
51. Chhabail
52. Chhakar Bandha
53. Chhatarpur
54. Chotka Karasan
55. Danapur
56. Darbhanga
57. Darzi Bigha
58. Dewajara
59. Dewaria
60. Dharahra
61. Duleahal
62. Dumri
63. Dumri
64. Ekamba
65. Fatehpur
66. Gajadharpur
67. Ganeshpur
68. Gangti
69. Gangti
70. Gareriya
71. Gejna
72. Gojara
73. Gordiha
74. Halim Chak
75. Hayat Chak
76. Herhanj
77. Imamganj
78. Imnabad
79. Jalah Bigha
80. Jalwar
81. Jamuna
82. Jhikatia Kalan
83. Jhikatia Khurd
84. Jhikatia Piparwar
85. Jhikatia Salis
86. Kadirpur
87. Kahto
88. Kalami
89. Kaloi
90. Kanauda
91. Karangarh
92. Karmaun
93. Kauwal
94. Kendua
95. Kesangha
96. Khesra
97. Khoira
98. Kishuni Chak
99. Kochia
100. Koiria
101. Kothi
102. Kuin Bar
103. Kujisar
104. Kunibar
105. Kunkarai
106. Kusamh
107. Kushumha
108. Kusmahi
109. Lautar
110. Lawabar
111. Lohanri
112. Loknath Chak
113. Madsari
114. Maira
115. Majhauli
116. Majhgaon
117. Majhgaon
118. Majhwalia
119. Majra
120. Malhari
121. Manan Bigha
122. Meghathar
123. Minhai Pathra
124. Mohanpur
125. Nagwan
126. Narayanpur
127. Naua Khap
128. Naudiha
129. Nawa
130. Nawadih
131. Niman
132. Nohata
133. Paini
134. Pakardi
135. Pakari Sohia
136. Pakri Guria
137. Panda Bigha
138. Pandepura
139. Panraria
140. Panti
141. Paran Chak
142. Parasiya
143. Parsia
144. Parsotimpur
145. Pasewa
146. Patail
147. Pataka Chak
148. Pathra
149. Pathra
150. Pathra
151. Patkhaulia
152. Pheru Chak
153. Phulwaria
154. Pinra
155. Pipra
156. Pokhari
157. Pokhraha
158. Pokhraha
159. Qazi Chak
160. Rampur
161. Rangha
162. Raniganj
163. Ranipur
164. Raunsa
165. Rausa
166. Rohwe
167. Sagrampur
168. Salaiya
169. Salwar
170. Samodh
171. Sewati
172. Shahpur
173. Shamshabad
174. Shiva
175. Sidhpur
176. Sohai
177. Solaia
178. Tanakwar
179. Tarwan
180. Telwari
181. Tetaria
182. Ujar khaira
183. Uman
184. Zarip Chak

== Khizirsarai ==
The Khizirsarai block consists of the following 102 villages:

1. Adampur
2. Aiwan
3. Bahbalpur
4. Bakthar
5. Balabigha
6. Baliari
7. Bana
8. Bara
9. Belawan
10. Benaul
11. Bihta
12. Bijopur
13. Bolakpur
14. Chhatahar
15. Chiraili
16. Dariyapur
17. Dariyapur
18. Degawan
19. Dewan Fatehpur
20. Dhansingra
21. Ekauni
22. Fatahpur
23. Fatehpur
24. Gauharpur
25. Gonardih
26. Harsingara
27. Hasanpur
28. Hathiawan
29. Hemara
30. Hurma
31. Inayat Chak
32. Ismailpur
33. Jamuawan
34. Karahra
35. Karpi
36. Keni
37. Kewari
38. Khaira
39. Khaira
40. Khidar Saray
41. Khudai
42. Khushahalpur
43. Kohbara
44. Kunrawa
45. Kusdehra
46. Kutlupur
47. Lalganj
48. Laliari
49. Lodipur
50. Lohraith
51. Mahammadpur
52. Mahkar
53. Mahuari
54. Mai
55. Makhdumpur
56. Maksudpur
57. Mananpur
58. Mandai
59. Mirapur
60. Mohammadpur
61. Mohkam Chak
62. Musepur
63. Nadira
64. Nagariawan
65. Naudiha
66. Naudiha Mahsi
67. Pachlakh
68. Pachmahla
69. Pachoi
70. Pachrukhi
71. Padum Chak
72. Paharpur
73. Panahri
74. Patak Bigha
75. Pathra
76. Pirkhan Sarai
77. Rampur
78. Rasulpur
79. Rasulpur
80. Rouniyan
81. Sadipur
82. Safipur Har Singhara
83. Sagarpur
84. Saidpur
85. Saindih
86. Sapnera
87. Sarbahda
88. Satawans
89. Shahbazpur
90. Shahbazpur
91. Shamnagar
92. Shekh Bigha
93. Simrauka
94. Sisawar
95. Sonas
96. Tajpur
97. Tarka
98. Tetariya
99. Tetarpur
100. Uchauli
101. Udhobar
102. Utrawan

== Konch ==
The Konch block consists of the following 127 villages:

1. Achuki
2. Adai
3. Addapur
4. Alpa
5. Amra
6. Angra
7. Ansara
8. Anti
9. Baikatpur
10. Bana Bigha
11. Barai
12. Bargawan
13. Barhauna
14. Basatpur
15. Bedauli
16. Bham
17. Bhikhanpur
18. Bhikhanpur
19. Bijahari
20. Bijahra
21. Birnawan
22. Bishunathpur
23. Chainpur
24. Chandaini
25. Chechaura
26. Chhatihar Jamalpur
27. Chobra
28. Dadreji
29. Daulatpur
30. Daurawan
31. Dewra
32. Dhan Chhuha
33. Dhan Chhuhi
34. Dharahra
35. Dhibri
36. Digghi
37. Dihuri
38. Ekariya
39. Gangti
40. Gararhi
41. Gauharpur
42. Gen Bigha
43. Ghoraha
44. Gorkati
45. Hasanpur
46. Hichhapur
47. Huse Chak
48. Isam Chak
49. Jagdishpur
50. Jahana
51. Jaitia
52. Jani Bigha
53. Kabar
54. Kachanpur
55. Kaiatanr
56. Kailash Math
57. Kairiya Madanpur
58. Kaithi
59. Kalyanpur
60. Kanaudi
61. Karai
62. Karmain
63. Kasturi Khap
64. Kathutia
65. Kauriya
66. Ker
67. Khabhra
68. Khaira
69. Khajuri
70. Khatnahi
71. Khawaspur
72. Koch
73. Korap
74. Kunin
75. Kurmanwan
76. Lodipur
77. Madanpur
78. Mahmudpur
79. Majathi
80. Majhiawan
81. Makhdumpur
82. Mangraur
83. Marhuka
84. Mithapur
85. Mok
86. Mukhochak
87. Murera
88. Narsinghpur
89. Nasirpur
90. Nehura
91. Newdhi
92. Nighai
93. Nimri
94. Pakri
95. Palanki
96. Pali
97. Panda Bigha
98. Pardhana
99. Parihans
100. Parrawan
101. Parsanwan
102. Peare Chak
103. Raja Bigha
104. Rajaura
105. Rampur
106. Rewara Pakar
107. Rupaspur
108. Salempur
109. Salono Bigha
110. Sarbahada
111. Shahabpur
112. Shahganj
113. Siari
114. Simra
115. Simrahua
116. Sinduari
117. Singhra
118. Sirgawan
119. Tankuppa
120. Tarari
121. Tineri
122. Tuturkhi
123. Usas
124. Usas Aslempur
125. Utren
126. Wahab Chak
127. Yahiyapur

== Manpur ==
The Manpur block consists of the following 77 villages:

1. Abgila
2. Alawal Chak
3. Amari
4. Amra
5. Badahpur
6. Badra
7. Bagahi Kalan
8. Baijal Tetariya
9. Bandhuwa
10. Bara
11. Belhanta
12. Berewa
13. Bhadeja
14. Bhadeji
15. Bheriya
16. Bhore
17. Bhualpur
18. Bhusanda
19. Biju Bigha
20. Bisar
21. Burhgere
22. Burhi
23. Burhi
24. Chiraila
25. Delha
26. Dohari
27. Dudhaila
28. Gandhar
29. Gangti
30. Ganjas
31. Gaura
32. Gere
33. Goga
34. Harli
35. Hunrrahi
36. Inguna
37. Jamuanwan
38. Kaiya
39. Kamalpur
40. Kemun Chak
41. Kharhari
42. Khedarpura
43. Kukiasin
44. Lakhanpur
45. Lodipur
46. Lodipur
47. Madarpur
48. Mahuar
49. Mahuar Kalan
50. Majhauli
51. Masautha Kalan
52. Masautha khurd
53. Mast Alipur
54. Meharban Chak
55. Mirzapur
56. Nanauk
57. Nanhak Chak
58. Naroghat
59. Nasirpur
60. Naudhariya
61. Nauranga
62. Nawada
63. Nima
64. Pachamba
65. Panda Bigha
66. Paroriya
67. Pathalghatta
68. Rasalpur
69. Rasuna
70. Sadipur
71. Sikahar
72. Sohaipur
73. Sonaut
74. Sondhi
75. Surheri
76. Tapsi
77. Usri

== Mohanpur ==
The Mohanpur block consists of the following 212 villages:

1. Ajnawan
2. Amahna
3. Amatari
4. Amhara
5. Amkola
6. Amsot
7. Arjuna
8. Babhani
9. Bagaha
10. Bagahi
11. Baghlatti
12. Baghnagri
13. Bagula
14. Bahera
15. Baijnathpur
16. Baijnathpur Tal
17. Baliyari
18. Balkoa
19. Banahi
20. Banda
21. Bandegara
22. Bankat
23. Bara
24. Bara Khar
25. Bardag
26. Barhai Chak
27. Barheta
28. Barki Bihia
29. Basu Kurha
30. Bazu Kalan
31. Bazu Khurd
32. Bela
33. Belahi
34. Belarpur
35. Bhagwanpur
36. Bhagwanpur
37. Bhagwanpur
38. Bhat Bigha
39. Bhatu Chak
40. Bhawani Bigha
41. Bihia
42. Bilaspur
43. Bishunpur
44. Bishunpur
45. Bongea
46. Bulaki Chak
47. Bumuar
48. Chanda
49. Chandrahuan
50. Chauari
51. Chawa
52. Chitagarha
53. Chitar Bisrawan
54. Choraya
55. Chorniman
56. Chuabar
57. Dangra
58. Dhamna
59. Dhamni
60. Dhanahari
61. Dharahar
62. Dharhara
63. Dhirja Chak
64. Dhorhi
65. Diwan
66. Duhobar
67. Dumra
68. Durjun Khap
69. Ekamba
70. Ergir
71. Erki
72. Gajadharpur
73. Gamhra
74. Ganesh Chak
75. Ghughuri
76. Goat
77. Gobardiha
78. Gopal Kera
79. Guhi
80. Guriawan
81. Hade
82. Hamzapur
83. Hanria Dag
84. Haraha
85. Inta Tikar
86. Itahri
87. Itra
88. Itwan
89. Jadu Chak
90. Jadua Chak
91. Jagdishpur
92. Jainagar
93. Jalhi
94. Jamuhar
95. Jamuna
96. Jamuni
97. Jarlahi
98. Jhalar
99. Jhanakpur
100. Jogar
101. Jogini
102. Jogiya
103. Kachanpur
104. Kadarchunan
105. Karjara
106. Kashiya Chak
107. Kenari
108. Kendua
109. Kenuari
110. Kewala
111. Khajurahi
112. Khap
113. Kharagpur
114. Khardi
115. Khuruwa
116. Khutaura
117. Khutaura
118. Koae Kalan
119. Koae Khurd
120. Koiri Chak
121. Kulahi Arazi
122. Kulhua
123. Kusmha Tal
124. Kusmhar
125. Lahangpur
126. Lahthua
127. Lai
128. Lakhaipur
129. Lalpur
130. Langura Kalan
131. Langura Khurd
132. Laru
133. Lebura
134. Ledahi
135. Lodia
136. Mahamadpur
137. Mahamda
138. Mahuliya
139. Majhar
140. Majhar
141. Majhauli
142. Majhaulia
143. Majhianwan
144. Majura
145. Manjhgawan
146. Manohar Chak
147. Manrar
148. Masaundha
149. Matgarha
150. Matihani
151. Mayapur
152. Mehiyan
153. Mero Khap
154. Mohanpur
155. Mohasim Chak
156. Musaila
157. Musar Sabda
158. Naghara
159. Nagwan
160. Narhar
161. Nataha
162. Nauniyan
163. Nawadih
164. Nawadih
165. Nidani
166. Nima
167. Pakariya
168. Paroriya
169. Parsauni
170. Pathak Gorail
171. Pathra
172. Piparsot
173. Pipra Chak
174. Piprahi
175. Rajaundha
176. Rajbar
177. Ramdasa
178. Ramgiriya
179. Ramna Chak
180. Rampur
181. Ramsagar
182. Raundawa
183. Rendibar
184. Roshan Chak
185. Sagarpur
186. Sahnu
187. Salaia
188. Salaiya
189. Sanwar Chak
190. Sehuan
191. Semarwar
192. Senduar
193. Shahpur
194. Siarbhuki
195. Sidhugarha
196. Simariya
197. Simra
198. Siriyawan
199. Sobha Chak
200. Sondiha
201. Soram Chak
202. Soram Chak Arazi
203. Sudia Gorail
204. Sugawan
205. Sujan Chak
206. Sukhdewa Chak
207. Surahi Chak
208. Tanrawa
209. Teswar
210. Tetaria
211. Tilaiya
212. Udi Khap

== Muhra ==
The Muhra block consists of the following 49 villages:

1. Abhaipur
2. Aer
3. Arai
4. Baikatpur
5. Basar
6. Bela
7. Bikaipur
8. Chamardih
9. Chandaila
10. Chandpura
11. Cheya
12. Chhibra
13. Dariyapur
14. Ganokhar
15. Gehlaur
16. Gendupur
17. Ghure Parsa
18. Jagatpur
19. Jalalpur
20. Jithian
21. Jota
22. Kajur
23. Karamchak
24. Kasiadih
25. Kharaua
26. Khetila
27. Mad Bigha
28. Mahammadpur
29. Mahapur
30. Mahuari
31. Mohanpur
32. Naudiha
33. Pachrukhi
34. Padmaul
35. Pakri
36. Panditpur
37. Puraini
38. Raj Bigha
39. Reula
40. Sarsu
41. Sauntar
42. Shahpur
43. Shahzadpur
44. Sirabilaru
45. Sohari
46. Sonra
47. Surajpur
48. Tetar
49. Tetaru

== Neem Chak Bhatani ==
The Neem Chak Bhatani block consists of the following 38 villages:

1. Amma Kuan
2. Arhanpura
3. Baddi
4. Bahuara
5. Bala Bigha
6. Bathani
7. Bhawani Bigha
8. Chari Sandi
9. Chhatni
10. Deay
11. Dhanmahua
12. Ghansura
13. Gobardiha
14. Horidih
15. Kabirpur
16. Kamalpur
17. Katari
18. Khesari
19. Khukhari
20. Kosaila
21. Mai
22. Majhauli
23. Maniara
24. Morabbi Chak
25. Naili
26. Natesar
27. Nemthu
28. Neyamatpur
29. Rarhui
30. Rohua
31. Saraunji
32. Saren
33. Shekhpura
34. Simraur Baraini
35. Singha
36. Singhaul
37. Sonsa Dharmu Chak
38. Tilari

== Paraiya ==
The Paraiya block consists of the following 77 villages:

1. Azmatganj
2. Baburi Chak
3. Bagahi
4. Bagahi
5. Baigoman
6. Baraila
7. Bhairopur
8. Bishunpur
9. Biso
10. Buknari
11. Burh Paraia
12. Dakhner
13. Dhansira
14. Fatahpur
15. Ganga Khap
16. Gularia Chak
17. Hardaspur
18. Haspura
19. Inglis
20. Inguni
21. Isarpur
22. Itwan
23. Jamalpur
24. Kajari
25. Kamal Dah
26. Kapasiya
27. Karhata
28. Karma Tikar
29. Kastha
30. Kasthua
31. Kauriya
32. Khaira
33. Khiri'
34. Khiriawan
35. Khusdihara
36. Kosdihara
37. Kurmain
38. Lachhuman Bigha
39. Lodipur
40. Mahadeopur
41. Majhar
42. Majhauliya
43. Majhiawan
44. Malahi Chak
45. Mangrawan
46. Maniara
47. Maranchi
48. Maranpur
49. Mobarakpur
50. Mobarakpur
51. Nad
52. Neuria
53. Parabhua
54. Paraiya Khurd
55. Paranpur
56. Paranpur
57. Parsawan
58. Pathraur
59. Phurhuriya
60. Pipara
61. Puna Kalan
62. Rajoi Rampur
63. Ramdih
64. Rampur
65. Sakhawa
66. Salempur
67. Sangaris
68. Sarabdipur
69. Shahpur
70. Sijua
71. Sikandarpur
72. Solara
73. Sonbarsa
74. Surhni
75. Tarwa
76. Ubhai
77. Uparahauli

== Sherghati ==
The Sherghati block consists of Sherghati Nagar Panchayat and the following 82 villages:

1. Afzalpur
2. Baher
3. Baniadih
4. Banian Baraun
5. Bar
6. Barawan
7. Bela
8. Beldih
9. Bharari
10. Bhat Kuraha
11. Bhikhanpur
12. Bhujaul
13. Bhus Bhusia
14. Bishunpura
15. Chanpi
16. Cherki
17. Chetab Kalan
18. Chilam
19. Dakhin Khap
20. Dariapur
21. Dewdhar Khap
22. Dhab Chiraya
23. Dhob
24. Fazlaha
25. Gawan Khap
26. Ghaghar
27. Ghaghri
28. Ghorijara
29. Ghorjara
30. Ghuji
31. Gopalpur
32. Harna
33. Hasanpur
34. Ismailpur
35. Jaipur
36. Jamuain
37. Janubi Chak
38. Jhawai Chak
39. Jhor
40. Jogapur
41. Kachauri
42. Kadwa
43. Kajarsot
44. Kalandara
45. Kamat
46. Kazarsot
47. Khairat
48. Khandail
49. Korahra
50. Kusa
51. Lachhnaiti
52. Lakardewa
53. Lohara
54. Mahammadpur
55. Majhanpur
56. Manjhar
57. Manjhar
58. Mansa Bigha
59. Mohabbatpur
60. Mohiuddinpur
61. Mohiuddinpur
62. Naknupa
63. Nawada
64. Niman
65. Pacharhi
66. Palhat Kalan
67. Palhat Khurd
68. Pandaul
69. Pandit Bigha
70. Phitki Chak
71. Rani Chak
72. Ratanpura
73. Salaiya
74. Samda
75. Shafichak
76. Sherpur
77. Sirampur
78. Sondiha
79. Sone Khap
80. Suggi
81. Uchirman
82. Udhan Bigha

== Tan Kuppa ==
The Tan Kuppa block consists of the following 98 villages:

1. Akurahwan
2. Andhar
3. Andhu Somani
4. Aranga
5. Aropur
6. Babhaniwan
7. Bahadra
8. Bahera
9. Bahsa Pipra
10. Baja Bigha
11. Banki Chak
12. Bara
13. Baraila
14. Bardiha
15. Barman
16. Barsauna
17. Barsiwan
18. Bhadand
19. Bhagwanpur
20. Bhetaura
21. Bilandpur
22. Burh Gijoi
23. Chamu Khap
24. Chanan Sanrh
25. Chehla
26. Chhaja Bigha
27. Choar
28. Dariaura
29. Darjiya Chak
30. Desarna
31. Dewa chand pipra
32. Dewara
33. Dhanheta
34. Dharampur
35. Dhibar
36. Duarika
37. Gajadharpur
38. Gangati
39. Gijoi Khurd
40. Guniyan
41. Ichoi
42. Imadpur
43. Inta Dih
44. Jabra
45. Jagarnathpur
46. Jaipur
47. Kaji Bigha
48. Kanwan
49. Kataiya
50. Katha Dih
51. Khabhra
52. Khalari
53. Khanrahra
54. Koktha
55. Maha Bigha
56. Mahamadpur
57. Maher
58. Mahiyarpur
59. Majhauli
60. Majhganwan
61. Makhdumpur
62. Manakdiha
63. Manikpur
64. Manmadho
65. Mayapur
66. Muda Chak
67. Naua Khap
68. Naudiha
69. Nawagarh
70. Paharpur
71. Pahri
72. Panti
73. Parsawan
74. Parsawan
75. Pathra
76. Pathra
77. Punaul
78. Sabalpur
79. Sadabah
80. Sahil
81. Saidpur
82. Salarpur
83. Salempur
84. Sarkanda
85. Semariya
86. Sila
87. Sonar Khap
88. Sultanpur
89. Sumeri pipra
90. Tajpur
91. Tankuppa
92. Tel Bigha
93. Tel Bigha
94. Telheta
95. Tetariya
96. Tetariya
97. Thekahi
98. Utli Bara

== Tikari ==
The Tikari block consists of Tikari Nagar Panchayat and the following 149 villages:

1. Agar
2. Akbarpur
3. Akhanpur
4. Akhtiarpur
5. Alalpur Bishunpur
6. Alampur
7. Alipur
8. Amarpur
9. Amawan
10. Ammakuan
11. Badwa
12. Baid Bigha
13. Bara
14. Barahtarwa
15. Barsiwan
16. Bazidpur
17. Bazidpur
18. Bazidpur Sakti
19. Bedauli
20. Belhariya
21. Belwakarhara
22. Benipur
23. Bhainsmara
24. Bhairwa
25. Bhawanpur
26. Bhelampur
27. Bhori
28. Bishunpur urur
29. Bohiyakamalpur
30. Chainpura
31. Chaita
32. Chhathawan
33. Chiraili
34. Chitokhar
35. Chora Bazidpur
36. Dariapur
37. Dariyapur Tepa
38. Daulatpur
39. Daulatpur
40. Dhebariya
41. Dighaura
42. Dihura
43. Dihuri
44. Egana
45. Fatehpur
46. Fenagi
47. Gaharpur
48. Ganga Sagar
49. Garaur
50. Ghanghaila
51. Ghirsiri
52. Gopalpur
53. Guljana
54. Harna
55. Harrahi
56. Hasanpur
57. Idinpur
58. Ismailpur
59. Ithori
60. Jagarnathpur
61. Jagdar
62. Jagdishpur
63. Jagir Kathak
64. Jainandan Bigha
65. Jalalpur
66. Jalalpur
67. Jamuara
68. Jolah Bigha
69. Kalyanpur
70. Kamalpur
71. Kapea
72. Karea
73. Kehonra
74. Kesho Bigha
75. Kespa
76. Khaira
77. Khanetu
78. Kharagpura
79. Khutwar
80. Kusap
81. Kusapi
82. Kuseta
83. Kutlupur
84. Labhra
85. Langatpur
86. Law
87. Lodipur
88. Lohanipur
89. Madarpur
90. Madhopur
91. Mahiarpur
92. Mahimapur
93. Mahmanna
94. Mahua Bigha
95. Makhdumpur
96. Makhpa
97. Malhya
98. Malsari
99. Manikpur Baliari
100. Mardua
101. Matai
102. Mau
103. Melda
104. Mira Bigha
105. Mohammadpur
106. Musi
107. Nasirpur
108. Naua Bigha
109. Nepa
110. Nimsar
111. Noni
112. Pachmahla
113. Paluhanr
114. Panchanpur
115. Pararia
116. Pura
117. Raksiya
118. Rampur
119. Rasalpur
120. Rewai
121. Ridpura
122. Rupaspur
123. Rupaspur
124. Sadipur
125. Sadopur
126. Sahwara
127. Saidpur
128. Salempur
129. Salempur
130. Salimpur
131. Sanra
132. Sawasin
133. Shahbazpur
134. Shahopur
135. Sherpur
136. Sherpur
137. Sianandpur
138. Sidhay
139. Sikariya
140. Simuara
141. Singhapur
142. Sivnagar
143. Sowal
144. Supta
145. Takuatanr
146. Tetariya
147. Tetarpur
148. Thanapur
149. Ulle

== Wazirganj ==
The Wazirganj block consists of the following 138 villages:

1. Amaitha
2. Amethi
3. Amu Chak
4. Arhwan
5. Aropur
6. Asnauli
7. Babhandih Wajirganj
8. Bahera
9. Bahhni
10. Bailo
11. Bairiya
12. Bajaul
13. Baliari
14. Baniyadih
15. Bara
16. Barhai Bigha
17. Basua
18. Bazidpur
19. Belwe
20. Bhagausa
21. Bhareti
22. Bhikhampur
23. Bhindas
24. Bhojpur
25. Bhura
26. Bichha
27. Bihiain
28. Birne
29. Bishanpur
30. Bodh Chak
31. Budhaul
32. Budhaul
33. Burhgharea
34. Chanda Buzurg
35. Chanda Khurd
36. Dakhinganwa
37. Dedaur
38. Dewa Chak
39. Dhandhar
40. Dharampur
41. Dumrawan
42. Ekamlua
43. Eru
44. Geraiya
45. Ghansampur
46. Ghareya
47. Ghuraha
48. Ghuriawan
49. Gobindpur
50. Hansra
51. Hemja
52. Hunrrahi
53. Intwan
54. Itwan
55. Jumuanwan
56. Kajha
57. Kanaudi
58. Kandha
59. Kandhariya
60. Karhauna
61. Kari
62. Karjara
63. Kaua Khoh
64. Kenar Fatehpur
65. Kenar Paharpur
66. Kewla Dhamna
67. Khajuri
68. Khanpur
69. Khiri
70. Khiriawan
71. Kobwa
72. Kolhna
73. Koriauti
74. Kujhi
75. Kumhrait
76. Kurkihar
77. Kusumhar
78. Lakhauwan
79. Lohjara
80. Lohjara Bhikhampur
81. Lorhiya
82. Madardih
83. Mahdewa
84. Mahuet
85. Mahugain
86. Mahugain Rasulpur
87. Majhauli
88. Majhgawan
89. Makhdumpur
90. Malikpur
91. Malthiya
92. Manaini
93. Mayapur
94. Meyapur
95. Mirajpur
96. Nakti Mahugain
97. Naudiha Kalan
98. Naudiha Khurd
99. Nawada
100. Nondih
101. Orail
102. Oriar
103. Oriar Khurd
104. Paharpur
105. Pale
106. Paranpur
107. Parsawan
108. Partabpur
109. Patahula
110. Pater Mangrawan
111. Pathraura
112. Pipra
113. Pipra
114. Punawan
115. Pura
116. Rengana
117. Rudai
118. Sahiya
119. Sarni
120. Sarsa
121. Selwe
122. Sewai
123. Shakar Khap
124. Shankar Bigha
125. Sikandarpur
126. Singhatiya
127. Singhaura
128. Siraji
129. Siri
130. Sowa
131. Tarawan
132. Tathi
133. Tetariya
134. Tilora
135. Tipau
136. Uman Bigha
137. Usri
138. Usuwa
