= Moke =

Moke may refer to:

== Places ==
- Moke (Bihar, India), a village
- Moke Lake, South Island, New Zealand
- Nā Mokulua, two small Hawaiian islands together known as "The Mokes"

== People ==
- Moké (1950–2001), Congolese painter
- Moké Diarra (born 1983), footballer from Mali
- Moké Kajima (born 1974), footballer from the Republic of the Congo
- Masena Moke (born 1980), footballer from the Republic of the Congo
- Peewee Moke (born 1986), Samoan rugby league player
- Mark "Moke" Bistany, American drummer
- Hans Moke Niemann (born 2003), American chess grandmaster

== Arts and entertainment ==
- Moke (British band), British rock band
- Moke (Dutch band), indie rock band from Amsterdam
- A type of fictional lizard in the Harry Potter books
- Mokes, villains in the PlayStation video game Mad Blocker Alpha

== Other uses ==
- MOKE (recreational vehicle), revival of Mini Moke by Moke International
- Moke (beverage), a traditional beverage from Flores Island, Indonesia
- Moke (slang), disparaging term for Pacific Islanders, especially Samoans/Hawaiians
- Moke (slang), British slang for a donkey
- Mini Moke, utility vehicle produced by the British Motor Corporation (BMC)
- Magneto-optic Kerr effect, MOKE, effect used for measuring magnetic properties
- List of storms named Moke
