= Lahathua =

Village in Bihar, India

Coordinates: 24°33′42″N 85°00′03″E

Lahathua is a village of Barachatti tehsil in the Gaya district of Bihar, India. Lahathua is situated 5 kilometres (3.1 mi) north of Barachatti.
