= Bhadeya =

Village in Bihar, India

- village
- Location in Bihar, India Bhadeya (India)
- Country: India
- State: Bihar
- District: Gaya
- Elevation: 159 m (522 ft)

Languages
  - Official: Magahi, Hindi, Urdu
- Time zone: UTC+5:30 (IST)
- Coastline: 0 kilometres (0 mi)
- Nearest city: Gaya, Kolkata
- Lok Sabha constituency: Gaya
- Avg. summer temperature: 30–48 °C (86–118 °F)
- Avg. winter temperature: 20–3 °C (68–37 °F)

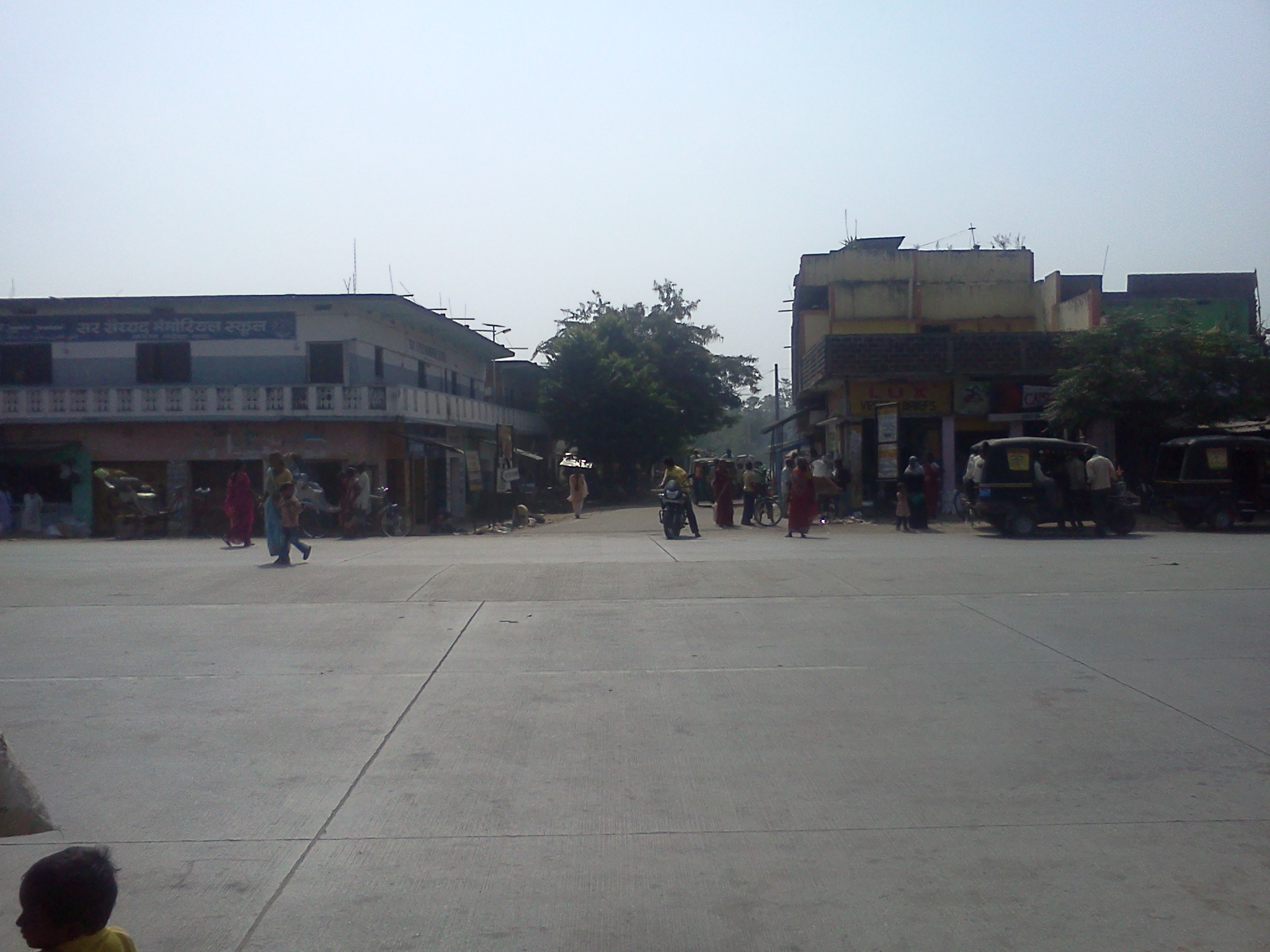
Bhadeya village front view

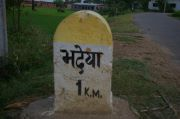
Bhadeya

Bhadeya is an underdeveloped country side locality in Gaya district of Bihar, India. Bhadeya is located in Barachati, Gaya, in the state of Bihar in northern India. Bhadeya includes Bhadeya, Karma and its localities of Azizabad, Karimgunj, Razagunj, Ansar Nagar, Zahoorabad. It also comprises Sondiha, Paili, Chhaura Bandh, Bigha, Imamgunj, Gaiwal Karma, Hasanpur, Mananbigha.

== Location ==
Bhadeya is at 24.78 north and 84.98 east. It is close to the Gulsakari river. National Highway 2 and Oldham Road (the old road from Gaya to Chota Nagpur) pass through Bhadeya.

== Inhabitants ==
Pathans are the ethnic majority. Beyond farming and local transport services people work in the states of the Persian Gulf, providing the area with an important source of income.

== Climate ==
Bhadeya has a tropical climate. Summers are generally hot (April–June), while winters are cool (October–February). It experiences southwestern monsoon rains from July to September.

== Education ==
Bhadeya has schools, Library and tuition centers serving rural south Bihar including:

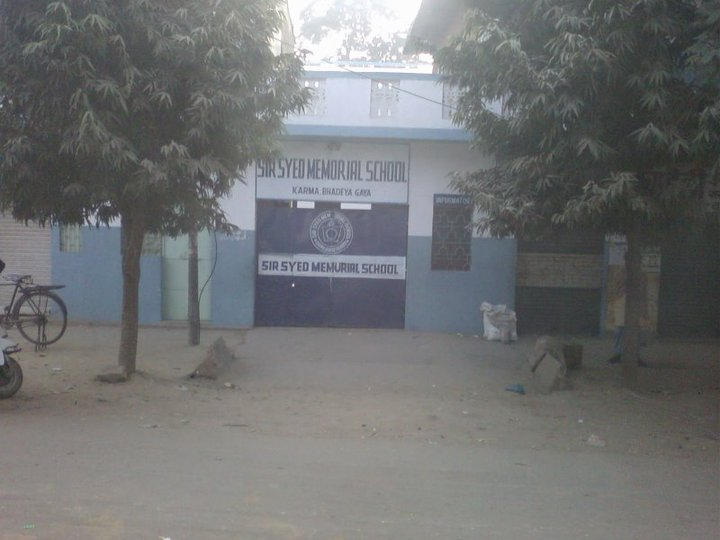
Sir Syed Memorial School

Madarsatul Uloom, Paily, Bhadeya 824220

- Sir Syed memorial school
- Sansons World School
- Azad Academy
- Urdu middle school, Bhadeya (Now Upgraded to 10+2)

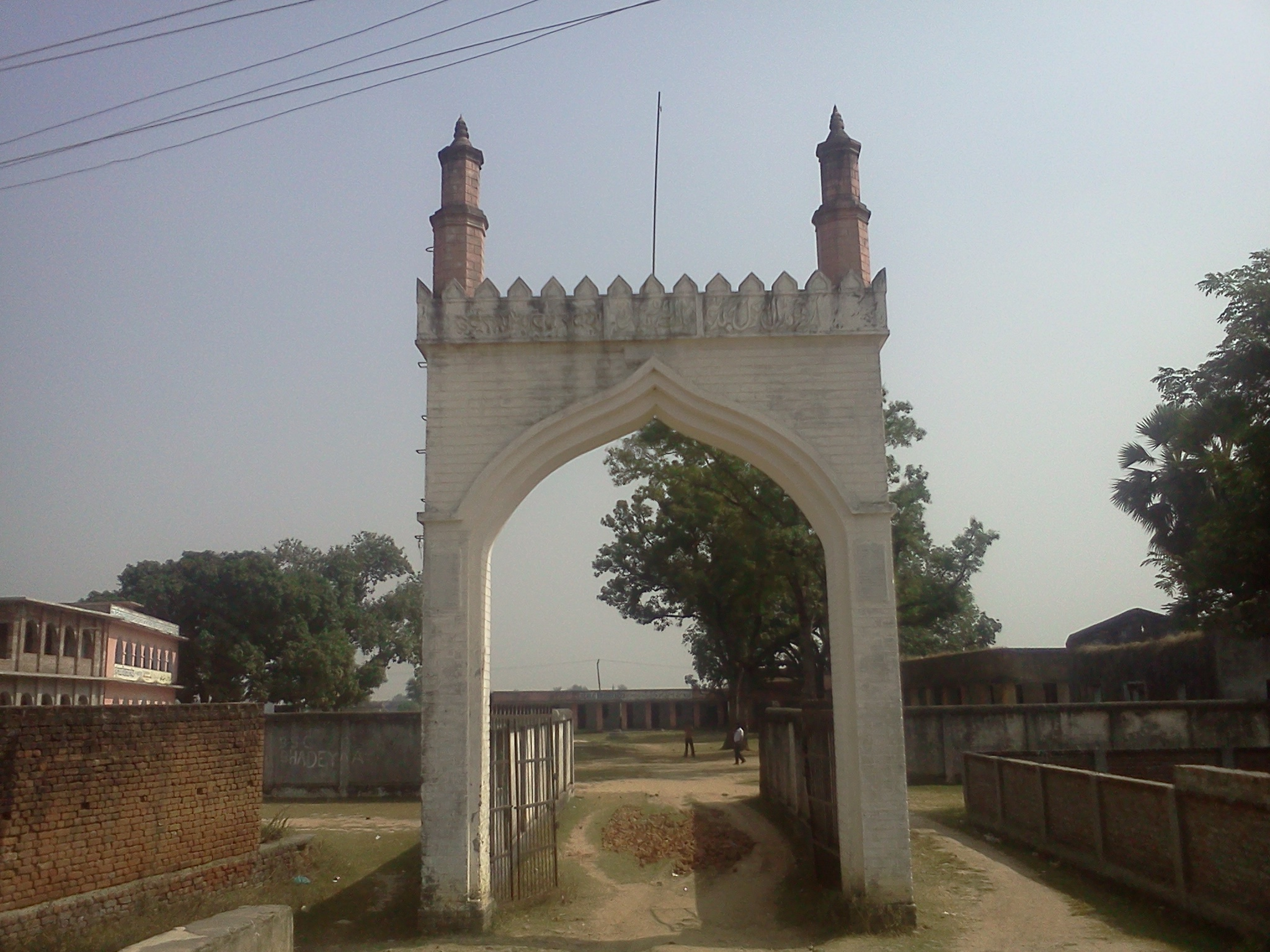
Urdu Middil School Bhadeya

- Mushtaq Ali Khan Minority High School
- Madarsa Amjadia,
- Bhadeya Public Library, founded by Bhadeya social welfare trust. http://bswt.in/

== Religion ==
The majority of population is Sunni Muslim. Bhadeya has five mosques: Bhadeya Jama Masjid, Bigha Par ki Masjid, Masjid Ali Azizabad, Masjid aziz and one at Kata Par. one more mosques are under construction in Shamshuddin Nagar.

== Notable people ==
- Zahoor Hussain Khan(Raja Sahab)
- Abdul Aziz Khan
- Mushtaque Ali Khan
- Alauddin Khan
- Kamal Uddin Khan
- Prince Nasim Khan
- Omair khan
- Aladdin Khan
