= Jalalpur (disambiguation) =

Jalalpur may refer to:

- Jalalpur, Ambedkar Nagar district, Uttar Pradesh, India
  - Jalalpur (Assembly constituency), the Uttar Pradesh Assembly constituency centered around the town
- Jalalpur Bhattian, Hafizabad, Pakistan
- Jalalpur Jattan, Gujrat, Punjab, Pakistan
- Jalalpur, Muhra, a village in Gaya district, Bihar, India
- Jalalpur Pirwala, Multan, Pakistan
- Jalalpur Sharif, Jhelum, Punjab, Pakistan
- Jalalpur, Tekari (census code 254691), a village in Gaya district, Bihar, India
- Jalalpur, Tekari (census code 254808), a village in Gaya district, Bihar, India
- Jalalpur (Vidhan Sabha constituency), an assembly constituency in Saran district, Bihar, India
- Jalalpur, Amawan, a village in Raebareli district, Uttar Pradesh, India
- Jalalpur, Bachhrawan, a village in Raebareli district, Uttar Pradesh, India
- Jalalpur, Malda, a census town in Malda district, West Bengal, India
- Jalalpur, Karnataka, a village in Belagavi district, Karnataka, India
