= Khandail =

Village in Gaya district, Bihar, India

Khandail खंडैल / کھنڈیل
- Village
- Location in Bihar, India Khandail (India)
- Coordinates: 24.6548°N 84.8607°E
- Country: India
- State: Bihar
- District: Gaya
- Block: Sherghati

Area
  - Total: 2.19 km^{2} (0.85 sq mi)

Population (2011)
  - Total: 3,040
  - Density: 1,390/km^{2} (3,600/sq mi)
- Time zone: UTC+5:30 (IST)
- PIN: 824237
- Lok Sabha constituency: Gaya
- Vidhan Sabha constituency: Sherghati

Khandail (Hindi: खंडैल; Urdu: کھنڈیل) is a village in the Sherghati block of Gaya district in the Indian state of Bihar. Administered under the Cherki gram panchayat, the village had a population of 3,040 in 484 households as of the 2011 Census of India. It is situated in the transition zone between the Indo-Gangetic Plain and the Chota Nagpur Plateau, within the Morhar River basin. The village's literacy rate of 73.91% and gender ratio of 1,074 females per 1,000 males both exceed the state averages.

== Geography ==
Khandail covers a geographical area of 219 hectares (540 acres) in the Sherghati block, in the southern part of Gaya district. The terrain lies in the transition between the Indo-Gangetic Plain to the north and the Chota Nagpur Plateau to the south, within the basin of the Morhar River, a waterway that flows through the Sherghati area and affects seasonal connectivity for surrounding villages. The broader Sherghati area historically served as a postal and military station on the Grand Trunk Road.

The village is situated approximately 10 kilometres (6.2 mi) from Sherghati, the block headquarters, and approximately 40 kilometres (25 mi) from the district headquarters at Gaya. Khandail was included among the survey sites in a 2019 agricultural landscape diagnostic study conducted across the Eastern Gangetic Plains by the Cereal Systems Initiative for South Asia.

== Demographics ==
As of 2011, Khandail had a population of 3,040, comprising 1,466 males and 1,574 females across 484 households. Children in the 0–6 age group numbered 510, constituting 16.78% of the population.

The village's gender ratio of 1,074 females per 1,000 males was notably higher than the Bihar state average of 918. The child gender ratio of 1,090 also exceeded the state average of 935.

The literacy rate was 73.91%, with male literacy at 75.61% and female literacy at 72.32%, both above the state average of 61.80%.

Scheduled Castes constituted 29.47% of the population (896 individuals). No Scheduled Tribes population was recorded.

=== Employment ===
Of the total population, 843 individuals were engaged in work activities. Main workers (employed for six months or more per year) numbered 649 (76.99%), while 194 (23.01%) were marginal workers. Among the workforce, 93 were cultivators and 383 were agricultural labourers.

== Administration ==
Khandail is one of nine villages administered under the Cherki gram panchayat. It falls within the Sherghati Assembly constituency and the Gaya Lok Sabha constituency.

== Education ==
The village has the Banat Model School, established in 1986, and a computer training centre accredited by the National Institute of Electronics and Information Technology (NIELIT).

== Transport ==
Khandail is connected to Sherghati and Gaya by road, with public bus service available in the village. The nearest railway station is located more than 10 kilometres (6.2 mi) away.

== See also ==
- Sherghati
- Gaya district
- List of villages in Gaya district
