= Kutlupur =

Village in Tekari, Gaya, Bihar, India

- Village
- Location in Bihar, India Kutlupur (India)
- Coordinates: 24.933°N 85.086°E
- Country: India
- State: Bihar
- District: Gaya district
- Subdivision: Tekari
- Block: Tekari

Population
  - Total: 3,543

Kutlupur is a village in Tekari block in Gaya district of Indian state of Bihar. It is located near the borders of Gaya and Jehanabad district. This is situated at around 40 km from the Gaya and around 50 km from the historical Bodh Gaya. According to the 2011 census, Kutlupur had a total population of 3,543 persons.
