= Preah Ko Preah Keo =

Cambodian legend

Preah Ko Preah Keo (Khmer: ព្រះគោ ព្រះកែវ, Preăh Koŭ Preăh Kêv; "Sacred Ox and Sacred Gem") is a famous Cambodian legend about two brothers who were born in Cambodia. The older brother was an ox named Preah Ko and the younger was a man named Preah Keo. Preah Ko possessed divine power, and his belly contained precious and valuable objects. The brothers were believed to bring peace and prosperity to the place where they resided.

The story is very popular in Cambodian society. It exists in several versions, including oral, written, film and paintings. Some Khmers have placed statues of Preah Ko and Preah Keo in local shrines, where they keep watch over the land they left but never abandoned.

== Origins and analysis ==
=== Title ===
Preah (ព្រះ) refers to what is sacred or royal. Ko(គោ) means ox and keo (កែវ) means gem. Preah Keo can also refer to the Emerald Buddha, which directly refers this legend back to its Khmer origin. The name of the legendary duo is a rich alliteration similar to that of other legendary duos such as Romulus and Remus in Roman culture or Hengist and Horsa in Germanic mythology.

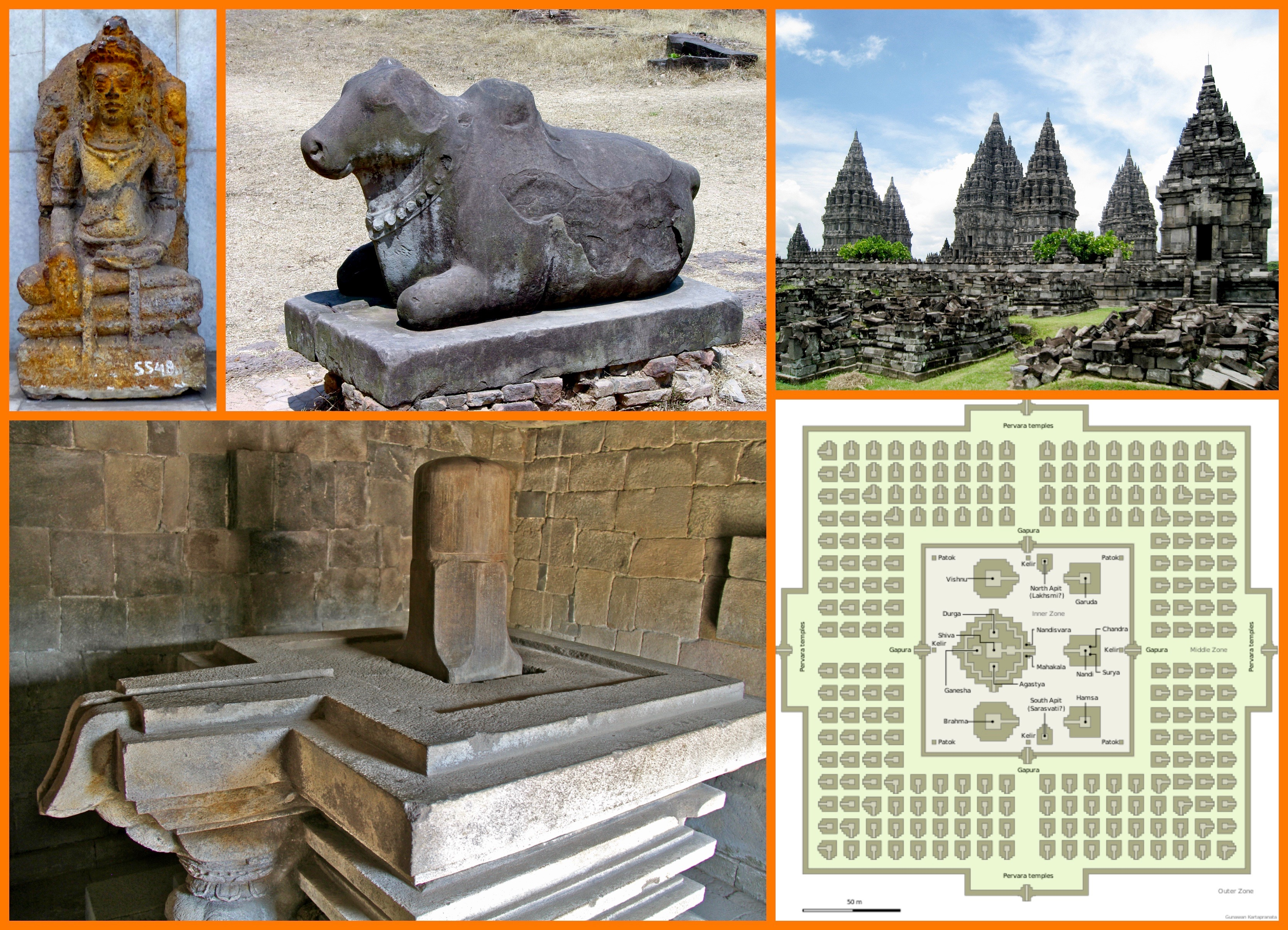
Preah Ko (Khmer: ប្រាសាទព្រះគោ, "The Sacred Ox") was the name of the first temple to be built in the ancient and now defunct city of Hariharalaya (in the area that today is called Roluos), some 15 kilometers south-east of the main group of temples at Angkor, Cambodia.

The title is representative of the blending of Hindu and Buddhist traditions in Khmer culture. Preah Ko, the Holy Ox, has often been associated with the Brahmanic account of Nandi in Cambodia. In fact, the Holy Ox is linked to the spread of Hinduism as Nandi is considered the chief guru of the eight disciples of Nandinatha Sampradaya who were sent in eight different directions to spread the wisdom of Shaivism. The ox is also one of the protective animals of the Buddha Gautama often represented in Cambodian pagodas. According to David Chandler, Preah Keo, the "Sacred Gem", is a metaphor for Buddhism protecting Cambodia. In fact, in neighbouring Thailand the Emerald Buddha is the national palladium.

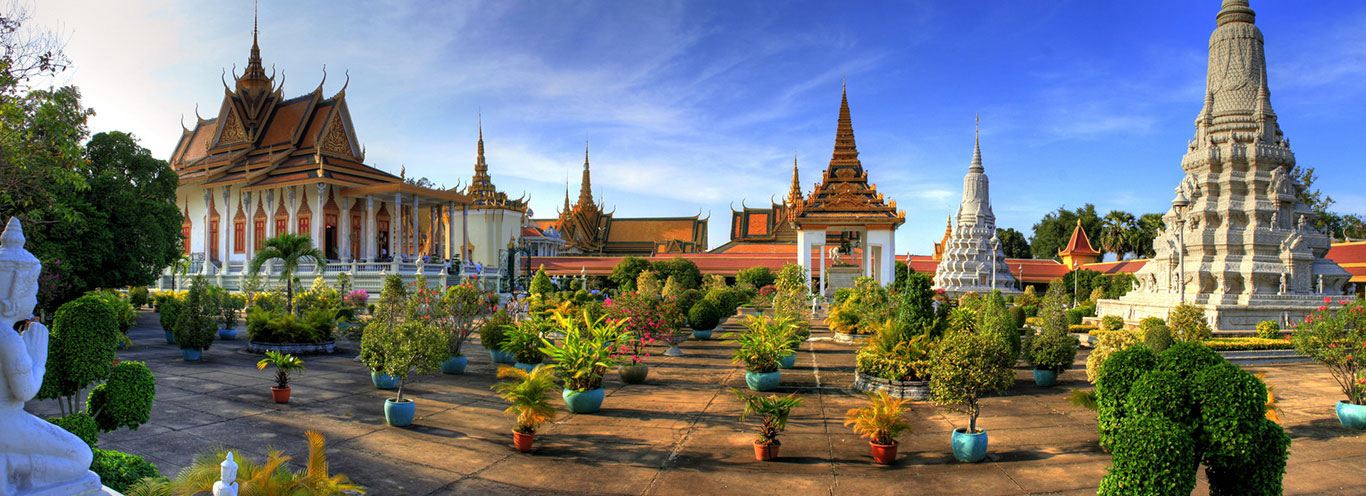
The Silver Pagoda, located on the south side of the Royal Palace, Phnom Penh is commonly known as the Wat Preah Keo (Khmer: វត្តព្រះកែវ) in Khmer.

=== Historical origins ===
The Khmers and the Siamese (Khmer: Siem) often warred against each other. The Siamese sacked the Khmer capitals of Angkor and Longvek in the 16th century, bringing back many precious objects, jewels, statues, texts, learned men and prisoners of war to their capital of Ayutthaya. The loss of these resources had a tremendous effect on the Khmer kingdom, which went into a decline. It is believed that Preah Ko Preah Keo began as an etiological myth to explain these historical events, particularly the fall of Lovek in 1594, and to express great sadness over the lost treasures.

According to E. Porée-Maspero, the legend goes back to the theft of the Preah Ko by Siamese soldiers. The Preah Ko was a metal calf, in the belly of which a great collection of pali writings were stored. After being rubbed with mercury for seven days, this statue could even walk. Another protective divinity called Khuoc, in the Khmer locality of Pisei, had been beheaded by the villagers; in revenge, this neak ta gave the Siamese soldiers a banana log to aid in capturing the Preah Ko, which they wanted since their people did not own any Pali scripts.

Another version, a brief oral tradition, was recorded in 1870 by ethnologist Gustave Janneau. As the King of Siam's army had failed many times to wrest Preah Ko and Preah Keo from Cambodia, he ordered that the firearms of his soldiers be loaded with gold and silver, which he shot near the Cambodian fortress. The Khmer realized these valuable projectiles had fallen into the bamboo forest nearby, so they decided to cut it down to pick the gold and silver from the ground. As soon as the field was barren, the Siamese king swept in with his army and triumphed over the disorganized Cambodian forces. He captured the two statues and split them open them to steal their valuable Pali manuscripts, which explains why the Siamese have dominated the Khmer people ever since.

A more precise date of origin comes from another account. In 1692, Cambodian king Chey Chettha IV asked his aunt to write down from her own memory the almost forgotten legends of Cambodia. At that time, she was able to recover the lost Khmer manuscripts, written on kampi and santra, which had been taken to Siam. It is in these manuscripts that the legend may have been recorded.

=== Transmission and scholarship ===
Textual criticism demonstrates the great variation of expression in Preah Ko Preah Keo stemming from various forms of transmission. In 1870, ethnologist Gustave Janneau translated Preah Ko Preah Keo from a very succinct oral tradition. In 1952, Kim Ky copied and printed Preah Ko Preah Keo from palm-leaf manuscripts dating back to the late 19th or early 20th century. In the transcription, the narrator, who refers to himself as Kau and describes himself as "an ordinary man of the people" originating from the Prey Kabbas District (Khmer: ស្រុកព្រៃកប្បាស), says he heard the song from a story-teller named Chai who sang it in verse. The Reyum Institute published a Khmer-English abbreviated version of the legend in 2001, and Ly Thayly published another Khmer version in prose in 2004.

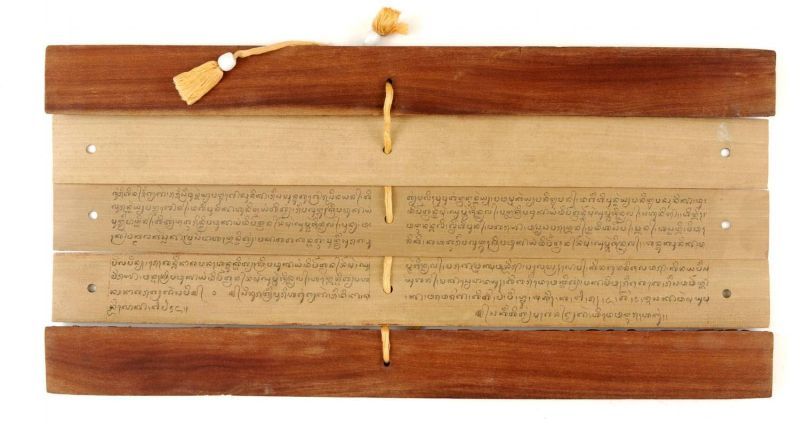
The earliest records of the legend were carved on palm leaves. Palm-leaf manuscripts (lontar) in dedicated stone libraries have been discovered by archaeologists at Hindu temples in Bali Indonesia and 10th-century Cambodian temples such as Angkor Wat and Banteay Srei.

== Synopsis ==
=== A miraculous birth ===
In the land of Takkasila during the reign of Preah Bat Reachea Reamathireach lives a man called Meanop, poor but of great virtue. His wife has a dream about three diamond rings. They meet a fortune-teller who announces that she will give birth to three neak boun (virtuous spirits) but that she has to refrain from eating green mangoes. While her husband is away hunting, she gives in to temptation and climbs a mango tree from which she falls, causing her death and the premature birth of her two children. These are an ox, Preah Ko, and a small child still in the placenta, whom Meanop liberates from the umbilical cord and tries to feed. They are, however, rejected by the villagers due to their mother's strange death.

=== The escape of Preah Ko and Preah Keo ===
After living in the forest for years, the brothers one day decide to play with other children. The children laugh at the brothers, beat them, and refuse to share their food with them. Seeing that Preah Keo is hungry, Preah Ko miraculously produces silver knives, forks and dishes, as well as food, from his belly. Seeing these treasures, the villagers decide to capture the ox and tie him to a kandol tree (Careya arborea). Preah Ko tells Preah Keo to hold on to his tail and both fly up into the air, making the tree fall down and kill the villagers, whom Preah Keo later brings back to life with an infusion of kandol wood in boiling water. Meanop, with no news from his children, dies of grief, but Lord Indra brings him back to life.

=== The encounter with Princess Neang Peou ===
King Preah Bat Reachea Reamathireach has five daughters who go down to Mocharim (Mucalinda) pond to play. Preah Keo joins them and, having fallen in love with the youngest princess, Neang Peou, seizes and kisses her, sparking jealousy in the other sisters. Back at the palace, the King orders the execution of his youngest daughter, despite the protests of her mother Botumea. After her execution, Lord Indra brings Neang Peou back to life and she is led by spirits through the forest back to the pond, where she sees Preah Ko and Preah Keo resting under a fig tree. Preah Ko brings a whole palace out of his belly, and the marriage of Neang Prou and Preah Keo is celebrated.

=== The three fights ===
==== The cockfight ====
In an attempt to invade the Kingdom of Cambodia, the King of Siam challenges King Reamathireach to a cockfight between his rooster A Romduol (literally the romduol flower) and that of the Cambodian ruler, A Rompong Phnom (literally "the one who retains the mountain"). After A Rompong Phnom is defeated, Preah Ko transforms into a young black rooster, and a new fight is organized. Preah Ko is victorious, and as an acknowledgement, King Reameathireach gives his kingdom to Preah Keo and his daughter Neang Peou. Preah Keo's lowly origins are forgotten, and he is recognized as a neak mean bou, a meritorious being.

==== The elephant fight ====
Humiliated, the King of Siam challenges the King of Cambodia to an elephant fight. Preah Ko transforms into an elephant and faces off against Kompoul Pich (literally "diamond peak") and comes out victorious.

==== The bullfight ====
In a final attempt, the King of Siam challenges Preah Keo to a bullfight. A mechanical bull is created by Siamese craftsmen with powers beyond any living animal. Premonitory dreams warn Neang Prou of the menace. The fight begins and Preah Ko, seeing his defeat coming, tells Preah Keo and Neang Prou to hold hands and hold on to his tail as he flies away. Neang Prou loses her grip and falls back to the earth to her death. Lord Indra turns her body to stone and brings her soul to paradise. Rather than become captives of the King of Siam, Preah Keo and Preah Ko fly off to the land of Phnom Sruoch (literally, the "pointy mountain").

=== Capture and captivity ===
The King of Siam sends his army to seize Preah Keo and Preah Ko in Phnom Sruoch, but the brothers fly off to the citadel of Lovek, which is surrounded by a bamboo forest. Instead of ordering the bamboo forest to be cut down, the king tells his soldiers to throw silver coins, or Duong, into it. The Khmer people then rush to the forest and cut down the bamboo trees to get at the silver. Exposed, Preah Ko and Preah Keo fly off to Phnom Attharoeus, a mountain in Oudong. As the Siamese soldiers seek them, Preah Ko and Preah Keo transform into buffaloes but are finally caught with ropes. Held prisoner in a Siamese palace, they make their escape and flee to Pailin in northwestern Cambodia. Surrounded again, they flee to Phnom Sampeou in Battambang, then further still to Phnom Thipadei and Phnom Thbeng. Finally captured, they are taken to Ayutthaya, where a special palace with seven walls is built to keep them captive in the Siamese capital, where they remain to this day.

== Cultural influence ==
Pictorial representations of the story are rather recent. Those of the Svay Chroum Pagoda, for example, were created in 1987. Most of the statues of Preah Ko and Preah Keo were erected in the second half of the 20th century. The full-size statues of the Tonle Bati Pagoda on the hill of Oudong date back only to 1990.

In Kampong Chhnang, various sites exploit the legend of Preah Ko Preah Keo to attract tourists. Very popular to this day, the legend has served to remind the Khmer people of times of tension with the government of Thailand, especially in 1958 when diplomatic ties were cut between Cambodia and Thailand and in recent years during disputes over the control of the temples of Preah Vihear and its surroundings.

== Bibliography ==
- Notton, Camille. The Chronicle of the Emerald Buddha. Translated from Pali version. Consul of France: Second Impression, 1933.
- Thung, Heng. “Revising the Collapse of Angkor.” Southeast Asian Regional Centre for Archaeology and Fine Arts, Vo. 9, no. 1, 1999.
- The Government of the People's Republic of Kampuchea. Thai Policy vis- a- vis Kampuchea. Phnom Penh: Ministry of Foreign Affairs, 1983.

== See also ==
- Culture of Cambodia
- Longvek
