= Jalpa Chak =

Jalpa Chak Chakjalpa Gurua
- Village
- Location in Bihar, India Jalpa Chak (India)
- Coordinates: 24.623561°N 84.714600°E
- Country: India
- State: Bihar
- District: Gaya
- Tehsils: Gurua
- Founded by: Chaurasia Barai samaj
- Named after: separated by Jalpa

Government
  - Type: Panchayati Raj
  - Body: Pakri

Area
  - Total: 1.7 km^{2} (0.66 sq mi)
- Elevation: 135 m (443 ft)

Population (2011)
  - Total: 986
  - Density: 580/km^{2} (1,500/sq mi)

Languages
  - Official: Hindi
  - Local: Magahi
- Time zone: UTC+5:30 (IST)
- PIN: 824211
- Telephone code: +91631
- ISO 3166 code: IN-BR
- Vehicle registration: BR02
- Nearest city/Town: Gurua
- Sex ratio: 1000/863 M♂/F♀
- Lok Sabha constituency: Aurangabad
- Vidhan Sabha constituency: Gurua
- police station: Gurua
- Literacy rate: 85.5%/67% male♂/female♀
- Climate: Normal (Köppen)
- nearest railway station: Guraru
- nearest National Highway: NH2 5.2 km

Jalpa Chak is a village in Bihar state in India. It is located in Gurua of Gaya district, Bihar with total 147 families residing. The Jalpa Chak village has population of 978 of which 525 are males while 453 are females, according to the 2011 Census of India.

In Jalpa Chak village population of children with age 0-6 is 184 which makes up 18.81% of total population of village. Average Sex Ratio of Jalpa Chak village is 863 which is lower than Bihar state average of 918. Child Sex Ratio for the Jalpa Chak as per census is 822, lower than Bihar average of 935.

Jalpa Chak village has higher literacy rate compared to Bihar. In 2011, literacy rate of Jalpa Chak village was 75.28% compared to 61.80% of Bihar. In Jalpa Chak Male literacy stands at 83.37% while female literacy rate was 66.73%. As per constitution of India and Panchyati Raaj Act, Jalpa Chak village is administrated by Sarpanch (Head of Village) who is elected representative of village.
