= Imamganj =

- city
- Location in Bihar, India
- Coordinates: 24.452521°N 84.584727°E
- Country: India
- State: Bihar
- Region: Magadha
- Division: Magadh Division
- District: Gaya
- Elevation: 182 m (597 ft)
- Time zone: UTC+5:30 (IST)
- PIN: 824206
- Telephone code: 06331
- ISO 3166 code: IN-BR
- Website: www.gaya.bih.nic.in

Imamganj is a city and a block headquarter in Gaya district of Bihar state, India. It is also a Bihar Legislative Assembly constituency in the Magadh division, part of the Aurangabad Lok Sabha constituency. It is located on the border of Jharkhand state, 65 km west of district headquarters Gaya, Bihar. It derives its name from Raja Imam Bux Khan of Sherghati.

The Imamganj block is spread over 61708.52 sq acres and includes 7 village panchayat and 195 villages. In 2011 Indian census, it had a population of 1,864, including 951 males and 913 females.

Muslims constitute 13 per cent of the population. The population of the city is increasing as people from the rural area settle in Imamganj. Imamganj has a CRPF camp in the block campus. Two rivers surround Imamganj, namely Morhar and Sorhar, and meet at Bhaghar.

In the 2014 Indian general election, the local voters defied the Maoists and voted heavily.

The Entrepreneur and author Satyapal Chandra is from Imamganj.
