= Salempur, Gaya =

Salempur
- village
- Location in Bihar, India
- Coordinates: 24.66°N 85.25°E
- Country: India
- State: Bihar
- District: Gaya

Population (2001)
  - Total: 372

Languages
  - Official: Magahi, Hindi
- Time zone: UTC+5:30 (IST)
- PIN: 824 236
- Telephone code: 0631
- ISO 3166 code: IN-BR
- Vehicle registration: BH -02

Salempur is a village under Tekari sub-division, Gaya district, in the state of Bihar in eastern India. Salempur has been long known for its prosperity under Tekari Raj. It is located near to the bank of river Morhar. Salempur is a predominantly Kayastha (in specific Ambashtha) dominated village.

== Demographics ==
As of record Salempur had a population of 1105. Males constitute 49% of the population and females 51%. Average literacy is approximately 100%, much much higher than the national average of 59.5%.

== Educational centre ==
People at Salempur have given special preference to education. Since it is close to Tekari, most of the people are educated at state Tekari Raj School. In addition to this, Salempur also has a government middle school named Late Rameshwar Govt Middle School. This school was donated by a socialist and resident of Salempur Rameshwar Prasad. However, the land for the school was jointly donated by Rameshwar Prasad and his youngest brother Sheo Govind Prasad.

== Occupation ==
Agriculture is the major source of income for the residents of Salempur.

== Climate ==
The climate of Salempur is tropical. Summers are generally hot (April–June), while winters are cool (October–February). It experiences southwestern monsoon rains from July to September.
