= Paharpur, India =

Paharpur
- town
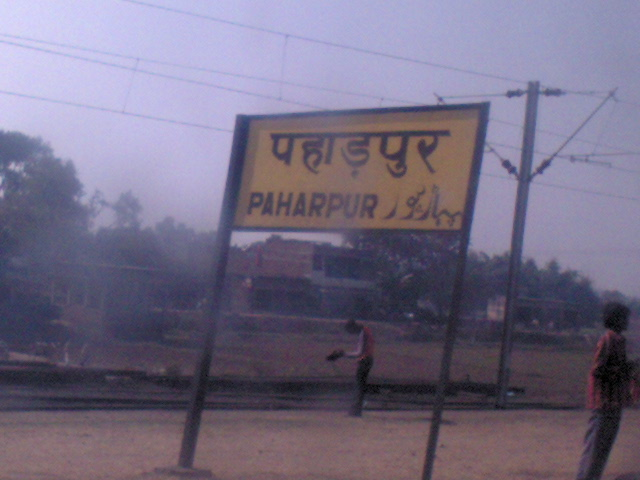
- Paharpur railway station

- Location in Bihar, India
- Coordinates: 24.607106°N 85.207943°E
- Country: India
- State: Bihar
- District: Gaya

Population (2001)
  - Total: 5,758

Languages
  - Official: Magahi, Hindi
- Time zone: UTC+5:30 (IST)
- ISO 3166 code: IN-BR

Paharpur is a census town in Gaya district in the Indian state of Bihar.

== Demographics ==
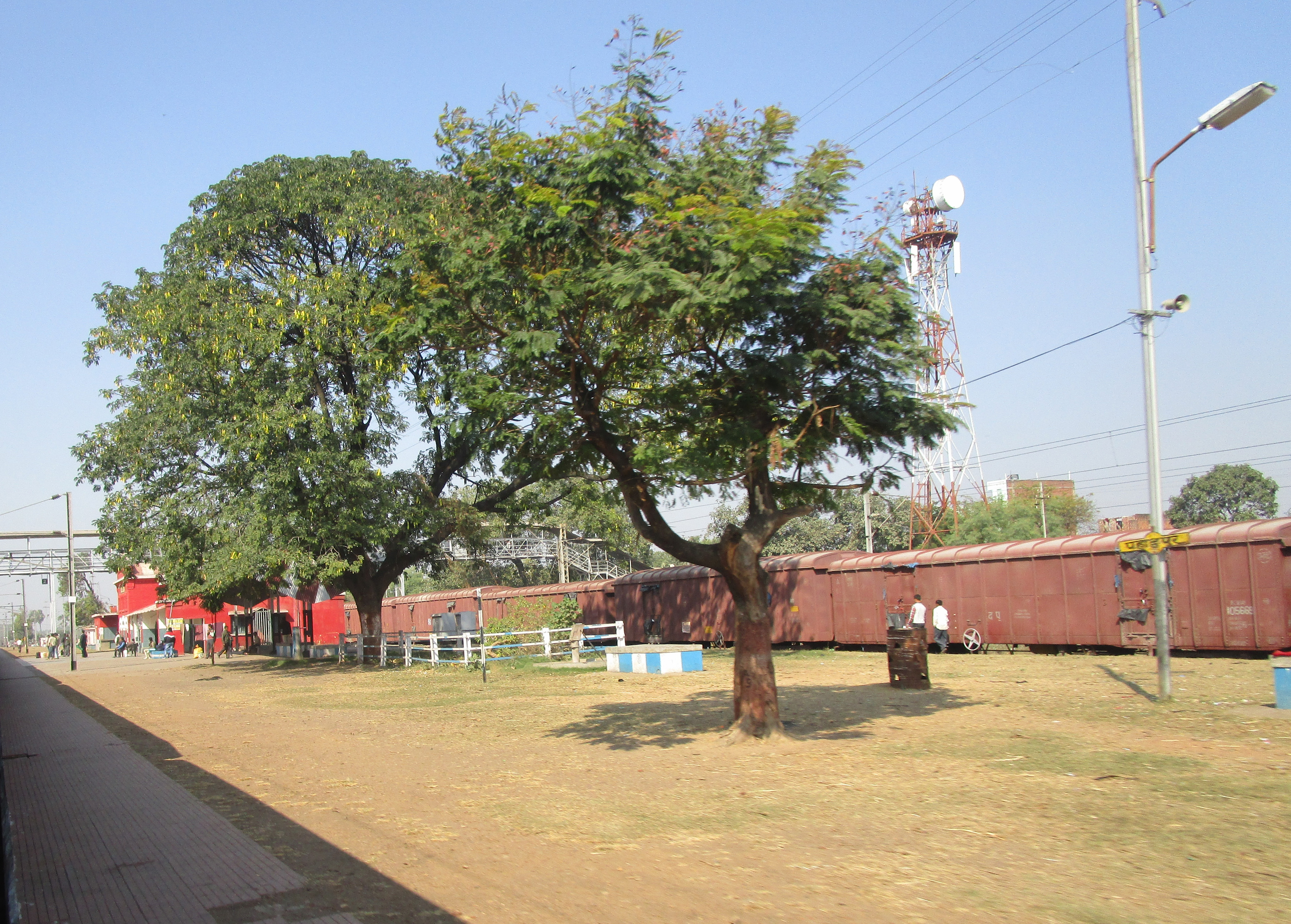
Paharpur railway station at Gaya district.

As of 2001 India census, Paharpur had a population of 5758. Males constitute 68% of the population and females 32%. Paharpur has an average literacy rate of 78%, higher than the national average of 59.5%: male literacy is 84%, and female literacy is 64%. In Paharpur, 13% of the population is under 6 years of age.
