= Khiriyawan =

Coordinates: 24°44′N 85°00′E

Khiriyawan village is a small village in Gaya district, Bihar, India.

== Demographics ==
As of the 2011 census, the population was 2,839 - 1,503 males and 1,336 are females giving a sex ratio of 889 which was lower than the state average of 918 There were 487 children 6 or younger, which was 17.15% of the village population. The literacy rate was 66.75% better than the state average of 61.80% Male literacy was 75.26% and female literacy was 57.37%.

This village is situated in wazirganj tehsil. Wazirganj(sakardas)is the area of sirmour Rajput caste. In this village Most of the peoples are Rajputs of the Sirmaur clan.

== Location ==
Transport to the village is mainly by train or by bus. The nearest main railway station is Gaya, and the local railway station is Wazirgunj. The local market is 4 km away at Wazirgunj, and the main town is the city of Gaya 25 km away.

== Economy ==
The village is in an almost dry area. The main source of employment is agriculture.
