= Sihuli =

Village in the Indian state of Bihar

Coordinates: 26°25′N 79°23′E

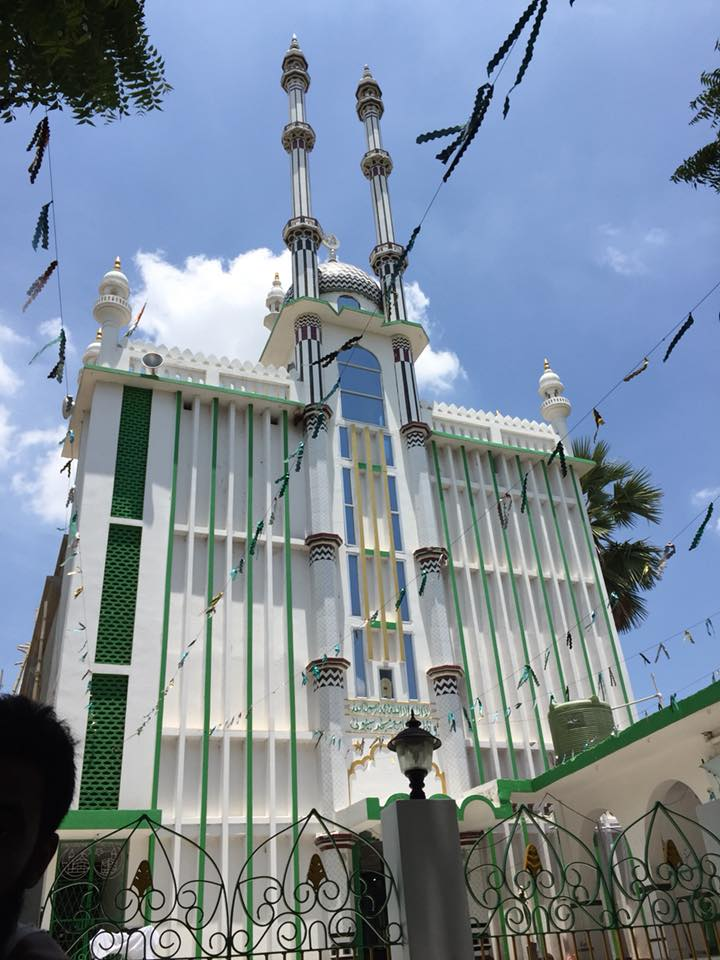

Sihauli is a village in the Amas Tehsil of Gaya district of the Indian state of Bihar. It is surrounded by the Kamaun range and situated on Sher Shah Suri Marg (GT Road) between Kolkata and Delhi. Sihuli is roughly 50 km from Gaya district headquarters and 142 km away from Patna.

Sihuli is mainly populated by Pathans.

== External links ==
- "sihuli masjid - Wikimapia". wikimapia.org.
