= Sahdeokhap =

Coordinates: 25.37°N 85.13°E

Sahdeo Khap is a village in Gaya district, Bihar, India. It is 20 kilometers from district headquarters and 10 kilometers from the pilgrim destination Bodhgaya. Sahdeo Khap is one of the most developed villages in Gaya district, and is one kilometer away the third biggest power grid of Asia. Its population depends mainly on agriculture to make a living. The majority of the population are Pathans ( which is an afghan tribe), with both Muslim and Hindu residents. There are several 10 +2 Schools, a hospital, a bank, a post office and a playground.
