= Dumaria, Gaya district =

Dumaria Dumariya
- town
- Location in Bihar, India
- Coordinates: 24.452521°N 84.584727°E
- State: Bihar
- Region: Magadh Division
- Division: Magadh Division
- District: Gaya
- Time zone: UTC+5:30 (IST)
- PIN: 824206
- Website: www.gaya.bih.nic.in

Dumaria is a Block in Gaya District of Bihar State, India. It belongs to Magadh Division. It is located 83 km towards west from District headquarters Gaya. 175 km from State capital Patna towards North. Dumaria Block is surrounded by Hariharganj Block towards west, Imamganj Block towards East, Chhatarpur Block towards west, Deo Block towards North . Aurangabad City, Hussainabad City, Sherghati City, Rafiganj City are the nearby Cities to Dumaria. Dumaria is a Naxalite movement affected area since 1980s. Dumaria consist of 100 villages and 11 panchayats. Lonchak is the smallest village and Kolhubar is the biggest village. It is at 93 m elevation (altitude). Magadhi is the local language here. Also people speak Hindi, Urdu, and English. Total population of Dumaria Block is 100,411 living in 15,531 houses, spread across total 100 villages and 12 panchayats. Males are 51,326 and females are 49,085.
