= Amraha =

- Village
- Location in Bihar, India Amraha (India)
- Coordinates: 24.878852°N 84.969131°E
- Country: India
- State: Bihar
- District: Gaya
- Elevation: 74 m (243 ft)

Languages
  - Official: Bhojpuri, Hindi
- Time zone: UTC+5:30 (IST)
- PIN: 824209
- Telephone code: 91-631
- Vehicle registration: BR-02

Amraha is a village located in the Gaya town C.D. block of Gaya district of the Indian state of Bihar.

== Demographics ==
This village hosts a population of 513 families, and an overall population of 3,303 according to government records.

== Administration ==
Amraha village is administrated by Mukhiya through its Gram Panchayat.
