= Mocharim =

Mocharim (Mucalinda)
- Village
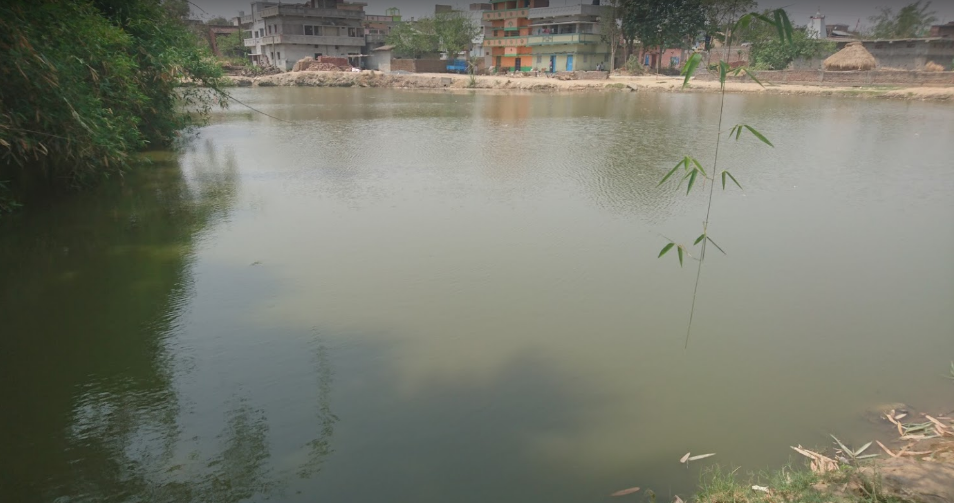
- Muchalinda lake

- Location in Bihar, India
- Coordinates: 24°40′50.0″N 84°59′32.0″E
- Country: India
- State: Bihar
- District: Gaya
- Municipal: Bodhgaya Nagar Parishad

Area
  - Land: 11.64 km^{2} (4.49 sq mi)
- Elevation: 34 m (111 ft)

Population (2011)
  - Total: 9,808

Languages
  - Official: Magahi, Hindi
- Time zone: UTC+5:30 (IST)
- PIN: 824231

Mocharim (ancient name Mucalinda) situated in the Gaya district, state of Bihar, India, nearly 1 kilometre (0.62 mi) south of the Mahabodhi Temple at Bodhgaya. It lies at the western bank of the river Niranjana (Phalgu). It is named after the naga Mucalinda or Muchalinda or Mucilinda, who is said to have protected Buddha from a great rainstorm when he was meditating. The village is home to Muchlind, an ancient pond where Buddha supposedly spent six weeks after attaining enlightenment.
