= Naili, Gaya =

Village in Bihar, India

Naili is a village in the Gaya district of Bihar state, India.
