= Jalalpur, Tekari (census code 254808) =

Village in Bihar, India

Jalalpur
- Village
- Location in Bihar, India Jalalpur (India)
- Coordinates: 24.927362°N 84.834011°E
- Country: India
- State: Bihar
- District: Gaya
- Block: Tekari
- Elevation: 74 m (243 ft)

Languages
- Time zone: UTC+5:30 (IST)
- PIN: 824236
- Telephone code: 91-631
- Vehicle registration: BR-02

Jalalpur is a village in Gaya district, Bihar, India. Jalalpur Village is located in Paluhar panchayat of Tekari block. This village has total 100+ families residing. The population was 2,441 as of the 2011 Indian census. It is only 0.5–1 km (0.31–0.62 mi) from Tekari (Tekari–Hichhapur Road), a city also in Gaya district.

== Administration ==
Jalalpur village is administered by Tekari Municipality, who is elected by Tekari and villager's people.

Particulars	Total	Male	Female
Total No. of Houses	100+		
Population	1300+		

People here speak Hindi, and Magadhi. Literacy rate in Jalalpur village is around 90.21 percent with male literacy standing at 81.93 and sex ratio is approx. 944 per 1000, more than Bihar average.

== Infrastructure ==
This village has average infrastructure. Electricity and clean drinking water have been provided to all people. Schools, colleges, post office, banks, hospitals are in the vicinity of this village. The most common occupation here is agriculture. Although most villagers also work as traders, teachers and clerks. A large chunk of population own a two-wheeler, television, fan. People of this village are very religious, cultured and deeply rooted with the tradition. Jalalpur village has a total of five temples.

== History ==
The village has historical parallels with the spread of Hindus in the surrounding region during the era of the Magdh empire. According to local ancestral tales, the village was developed by 'Raja Gopal Saran' king of Tekari. The story claims that the village, It lies near the borders of the village of Jalalpur. The name Jalalpur is based water and supply.
