= Omair Khan =

Indian politician

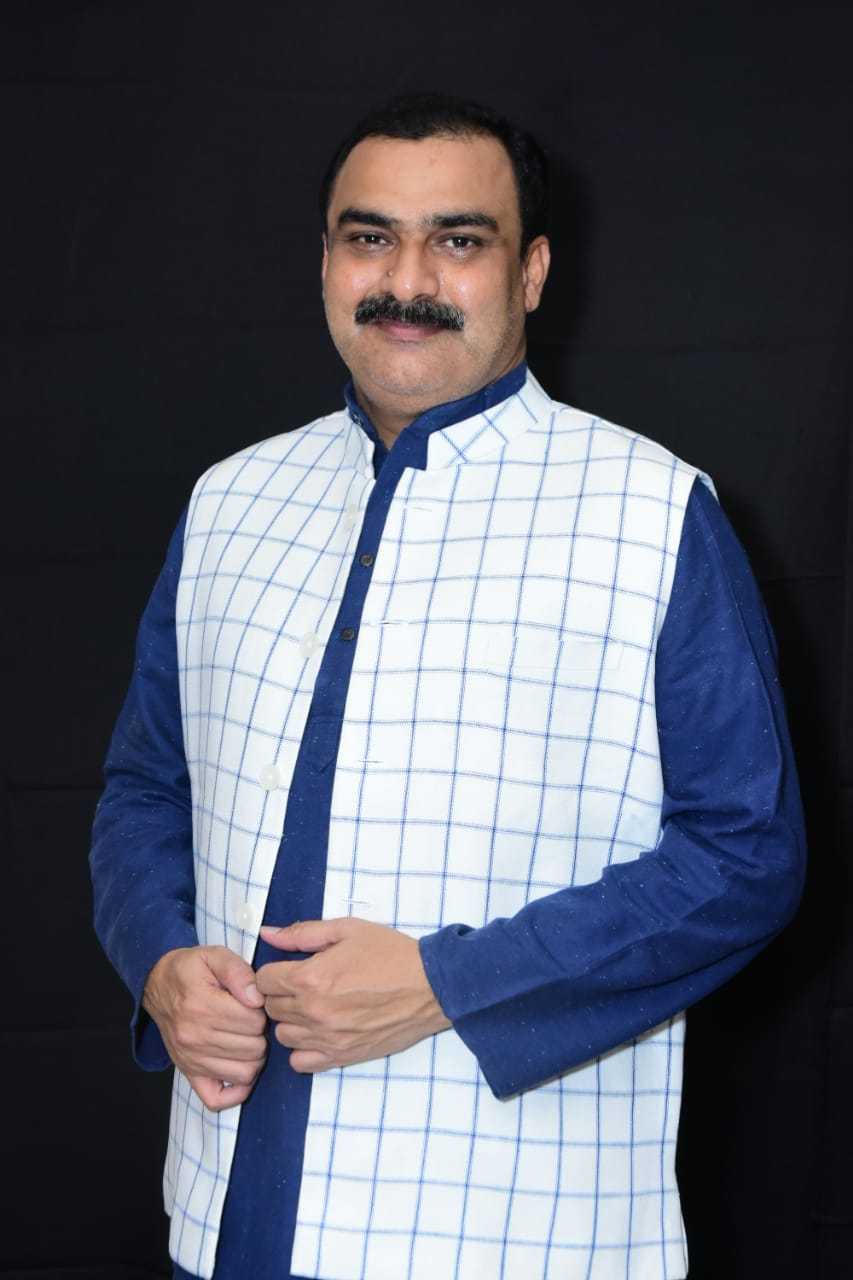

Member,

Personal details
- Born: 27 January 1970 (age 56) Gaya, Bihar, India
- Party: Indian National Congress
- Education: Aligarh Muslim University, Aligarh
- Website: http://www.facebook.com/omairkhanoffice

Omair Khan (born 27 January 1970) is an Indian politician from eastern Indian State, Bihar. Omair, a leader of the Indian National Congress, previously he also served in Jan Adhikar Party as Bihar state Working president and spokesperson of the Jan Adhikar Party. Khan has been leading protests against CAA-NRC at Shantibagh, Gaya under the 'Samvidhan Bachao Morcha' banner.

== Education ==
In 1985, Khan completed his 10th standard from Gaya High school, in Gaya. In 1987, he completed the 12th standard from Aligarh Muslim University (AMU). He graduated with a BA(Hons) in History from AMU.

In 1990 Khan received a gold medal during his graduation. In 1992, he completed his post-graduate work and earned an MA in History from AMU. He also has a diploma in marketing management from the National Institute of Sales in New Delhi.
