= Yahiyapur =

- Village
- Location in Uttar Pradesh, India Yahiyapur (India)
- Coordinates: 29.28°N 77.72°E
- Country: India
- State: Uttar Pradesh
- District: Muzaffarnagar

Government
  - Body: Gram panchayat

Population
  - Total: 1,200

Languages
  - Official: Hindi
- Time zone: UTC+5:30 (IST)
- PIN: 251201
- Vehicle registration: UP
- Nearest city: Khatauli
- Literacy: 100%%
- Climate: Normal (Köppen)
- Website: up.gov.in

Yahiyapur is a small village on Meerapur Ghatayan road near Khatauli (Khatauli is a small town in Muzaffarnagar district of Uttar Pradesh, located on NH- 58 29.28° N 77.72° E), in India.

The majority of the population are Rawa Rajputs (a Rajput community). Apart from Rawa Rajputs there are other castes including the Saini, Kashyap and Harijans.

Agriculture is the main source of income for almost all the villagers. A few people have work in small industries in Khatauli and some others have their own shops there. The literacy rate is quite high. Yahiyapur is considered one of more prosperous villages in the area.

Sunil Kumar was selected as Gram Pradhan in last election.
