= Gurua (community development block) =

Community development block in Gaya district, Bihar, India

- Community
- Gurua
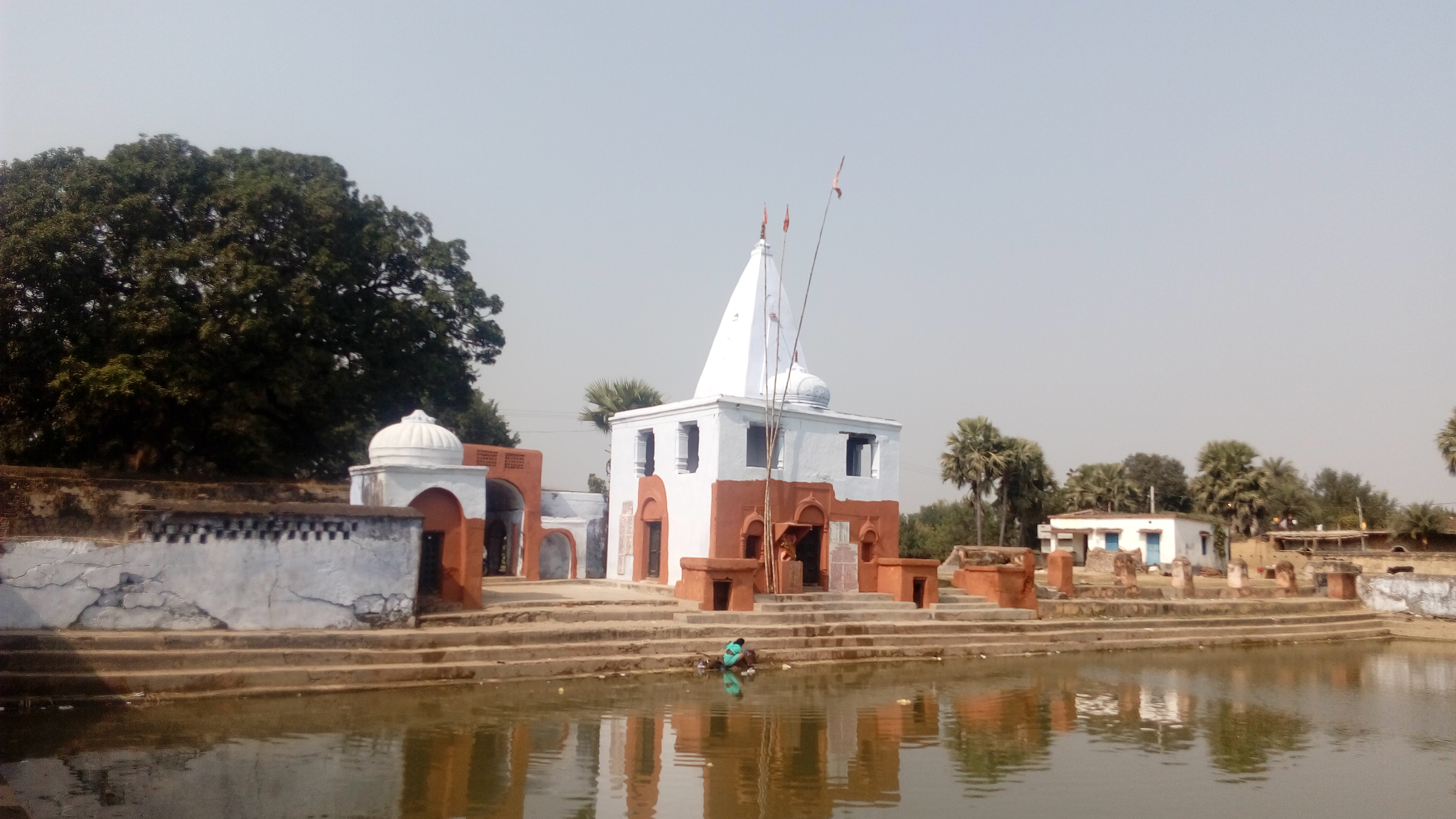
- Gurua surya mandir

- Location in Bihar, India
- Coordinates: 24.668643°N 84.772342°E
- Country: India
- State: Bihar
- District: Gaya
- CD block: Gurua
- Founded by: mvicky chandra

Government
  - Type: Bihar Govt.
  - Body: Legislative Assembly of Bihar
  - MLA: vinay yadav (RJD)

Area
  - Total: 236.24 km^{2} (91.21 sq mi)

Population (2011)
  - Total: 184,286
  - Density: 780.08/km^{2} (2,020.4/sq mi)
- Time zone: UTC+5:30 (IST)
- PIN: 824205(Gurua)
- Telephone/STD code: +91631
- Vehicle registration: BR 02
- Lok Sabha constituency: Aurangabad
- Vidhan Sabha constituency: Gurua
- Website: gaya.nic.in www.facebook.com/guruacity/

Gurua is a community development block that forms an administrative division in Gaya district, Bihar state, India. Situated in rural/urban area of Bihar, it is one of the 24 blocks of Gaya district. The block (#486) has 175 villages and 29,938 families. As per 2011 census, Gurua's population is 184,286, 94,987 are which males and 892,99 of which are females. This block has 34,095 children (17,388 boys and 16,707 girls) under age 6. Gurua's literacy rate is 52%, with males (60%) having a higher rate of literacy than females (43%).
