= Jalalpur, Tekari (census code 254691) =

Village in Bihar, India

Jalalpur
- Village
- Country: India
- State: Bihar
- District: Gaya
- Block: Tekari

Population (2011)
  - Total: 5,256
- Time zone: UTC+05:30 (IST)

Jalalpur is a village in Tekari block of Gaya district, Bihar, India. The population was 5,256 at the 2011 Indian census.
