= Dobhi =

- Town
- Location in Bihar, India Dobhi (India)
- Coordinates: 24.53°N 84.91°E
- Country: India
- State: Bihar
- District: Gaya

Languages
  - Official: Magahi, Hindi
- Time zone: UTC+5:30 (IST)
- Postal code: 824220
- ISO 3166 code: IN-BR

Dobhi is a large city located in Dobhi Block of the Gaya district in the northeast Indian state of Bihar. Dobhi is situated on the banks of river Falgu. Three national highways pass through Dobhi. Dobhi itself has the biggest park of Bihar. The population of Dobhi city is currently around 25,000.

== Eco tourism ==
There is a Bio diversity park named as Buddha Vatika in Dobhi block area, spread over an area of 23 acres. It is located close to Grand Trunk Road(NH-2). This park inhabits all kinds of plant species found in Bihar, particularly those near to extinction due to deforestation.

== Geographical location ==
Dobhi village is found just off the banks of the Falgu River.

== Temple ==
Shri Ram Janaki Thakurbari Dobhi, Devi Mandir Bypass, Devi Mandir Ningri is situated in Dobhi. And on the road going from here to Ranchi, there is Shri Radha Krishna Thakur Bari Temple in Ghirsindi Kalan village.

== Transport ==
Dobhi village resides at the junction of two national highways: NH 19 (Grand Trunk Road) and NH 22, the latter of which connects to Bodh Gaya, Gaya and Patna; as well as to Jharkhand (a neighbouring state).

Dobhi is located approximately 25 kilometres (16 mi) from Gaya Airport, 2 kilometres (1.2 mi) from Chanda Village, and 5 kilometres (3.1 mi) south of Amarut.
