= Moké Kajima =

Congolese footballer (born 1974)

Personal information
- Date of birth: 3 June 1974 (age 52)
- Place of birth: Kinshasa, Zaire
- Height: 1.70 m (5 ft 7 in)
- Position: Left-back

Senior career*
| Years | Team | Apps | (Gls) |
| 1993–1994 | Rennes B | 19 | (5) |
| 1994–1995 | S.C. Braga B | | |
| 1995–1996 | Vendée Fontenay Foot | | |
| 1996–1999 | Limoges FC | 76 | (8) |
| 1999–2000 | Reims | 31 | (0) |
| 2000–2001 | Olympique Noisy-le-Sec | 23 | (2) |
| 2001–2002 | Olympique Alès | 28 | (0) |
| 2002–2003 | Pau FC | 36 | (1) |
| 2003–2006 | Dijon | 80 | (1) |
| 2007–2008 | Paris FC | 10 | (0) |
| 2008–2009 | Orléans | 7 | (0) |
| 2009–2011 | Calais RUFC | 31 | (0) |
| 2011–2012 | Pacy Vallée-d'Eure | 7 | (0) |
| 2012–2015 | Calais RUFC | 20 | (0) |

International career
| 2006 | Congo | 1 | (0) |
- * Club domestic league appearances and goals

Moké Kajima (born 3 June 1974) is a Congolese former professional footballer who played as a left-back. Born in Zaire, he represented the Republic of the Congo at international level.

== Club career ==
Kajima played at Olympique Noisy-le-Sec in 2000 before moving after a season to Olympique Alès. He moved from Alès, again after just one season, to Pau FC in 2002. His form at Pau caught the eye of some higher-level clubs as he appeared 36 times at the club, scoring once. He moved to Dijon in 2003, where he played three seasons and moved to Paris FC. He joined after one year and 10 games with Paris FC to Orléans in July 2008.

== International career ==
Kajima played his first international match for the Congo national football team in 2006. Previously, he had been called up to the DR Congo national football team in 2005, but did not appear in a match.

== Personal life ==
Kajima acquired French nationality by naturalization on 13 June 1997.
