= Moke Village =

Moke
- town
- Location in Bihar, India Moke (India)
- Coordinates: 24.9543°N 84.7836°E
- Country: India
- State: Bihar

Languages
  - Official: Maithili, Hindi
- Time zone: UTC+5:30 (IST)
- ISO 3166 code: IN-BR

Moke Village is a village under Konch block of Bihar state, India. This village is situated near Tekari sub-division. One canal called Sone Canal System passes through the village, which helps to irrigate the agricultural land. Rice, pulses and sugar cane are produced from the land. As the village does not have a sugar mill, agriculturalists convert the sugar cane into boiled sugar or raw sugar.

The election census code is 03966000.

The Konch block has the following villages:

1. Achuki
2. Adai
3. Alpa
4. Amra
5. Angra
6. Ansara
7. Anti
8. Barai
9. Bargawan
10. Barhauna
11. Basatpur
12. Bedauli
13. Bham
14. Bhikhanpur
15. Bijahari
16. Birnawan
17. Bishunathpur
18. Chainpur
19. Chandaini
20. Chechaura
21. Chobra
22. Daulatpur
23. Daurawan
24. Dhan Chhuha
25. Dhan Chhuhi
26. Dharahra
27. Dhibri
28. Digghi
29. Ekariya
30. Gangti
31. Gauharpur
32. Gen Bigha
33. Ghoraha
34. Gorkati
35. Hasanpur
36. Huse Chak
37. Jagdishpur
38. Jahana
39. Kabar
40. Kachanpur
41. Kailash Math
42. Kairiya Madanpur
43. Kalyanpur
44. Kanaudi
45. Karai
46. Kasturi Khap
47. Kathutia
48. Kauriya
49. Ker
50. Khabhra
51. Khaira
52. Khajuri
53. Khatnahi
54. Korap
55. Kunin
56. Lodipur
57. Madanpur
58. Majathi
59. Majhiawan
60. Mithapur
61. Mok
62. Murera
63. Nasirpur
64. Nehura
65. Newdhi
66. Nighai
67. Nimri
68. Pakri
69. Palanki
70. Panda Bigha
71. Pardhana
72. Parrawan
73. Parsanwan
74. Rajaura
75. Rampur
76. Rewara Pakar
77. Rupaspur
78. Salempur
79. Salono Bigha
80. Sarbahada
81. Shahganj
82. Siari
83. Simra
84. Simrahua
85. Tineri
86. Tuturkhi
87. Usas
88. Wahab Chak
