= Barachatti =

- tehsil
- Location in Bihar, India
- Coordinates: 24°31′0″N 85°1′0″E
- Country: India
- State: Bihar
- District: Gaya
- Elevation: 159 m (522 ft)

Languages
  - Official: Magahi, Hindi
- Time zone: UTC+5:30 (IST)
- PIN: 824201
- Coastline: 0 kilometres (0 mi)
- Nearest city: Gaya, Kolkatta
- Lok Sabha constituency: Gaya
- Avg. summer temperature: 30–48 °C (86–118 °F)
- Avg. winter temperature: 20–3 °C (68–37 °F)

Barachatti is a block (tehsil) in the Gaya district of the Indian state of Bihar.

== Administration ==
It contains 141 villages and 13 gram panchayats. Sarwan Bazar is the biggest and Nimi is the smallest village. Sarva Bazar and Sarva Khash are undeveloped villages. Jyoti Manjhi is MLA of Barachatti. Sobh Bazaar is the largest bazar of Sabji Mandi in Bihar.

== Water ==
The groundwater level has declined and water is scarce. The Nal Jal pay Jal yojna program failed to provide domestic water supply.

== Demographics ==
The total population is 142,534 according to the 2011 census. There were 72,455 males (51%) and 70,079 females (49%).

The literacy rate for the population was 48 per cent. Literates were 67,745 of which males were 39,891 and females 27,854.

== Geography ==
It is situated 45 km south of district headquarters Gaya and 150 km from the state capital Patna in the north. It is bounded by Chouparan Block towards the east, Itkhori Block towards the south, Fatehpur Block towards the north, Mohanpur Block towards the north. Bodh Gaya City, Gaya City, Sherghati City, Jhumri Tilaiya City are the closest cities.

== Transport ==
National Highway 2 Grand Trunk Road from Kolkata to Delhi passes through Barachatti. The nearest railway station is Gaya Junction 47 km from Barachatti, which has trains to major destinations. The nearest airport is Gaya International Airport 40 km away.

== Commerce ==
Barachatti Bazar, sobh Bazar (Sanichhar Bazar) Sarwan Bazar (Mangal Bazar) is among the largest cattle markets in Gaya. The Mangal bazaar runs every Tuesday. Other markets in Barachatti include Sobh Bazzar, (jagarnath vastraly sobh) Bhadhya bazzar and Barachatti market. Balti & Jug market is there.
