= Gaya district =

District in Bihar, India

Coordinates: 24°45′N 85°00′E

- District of Bihar
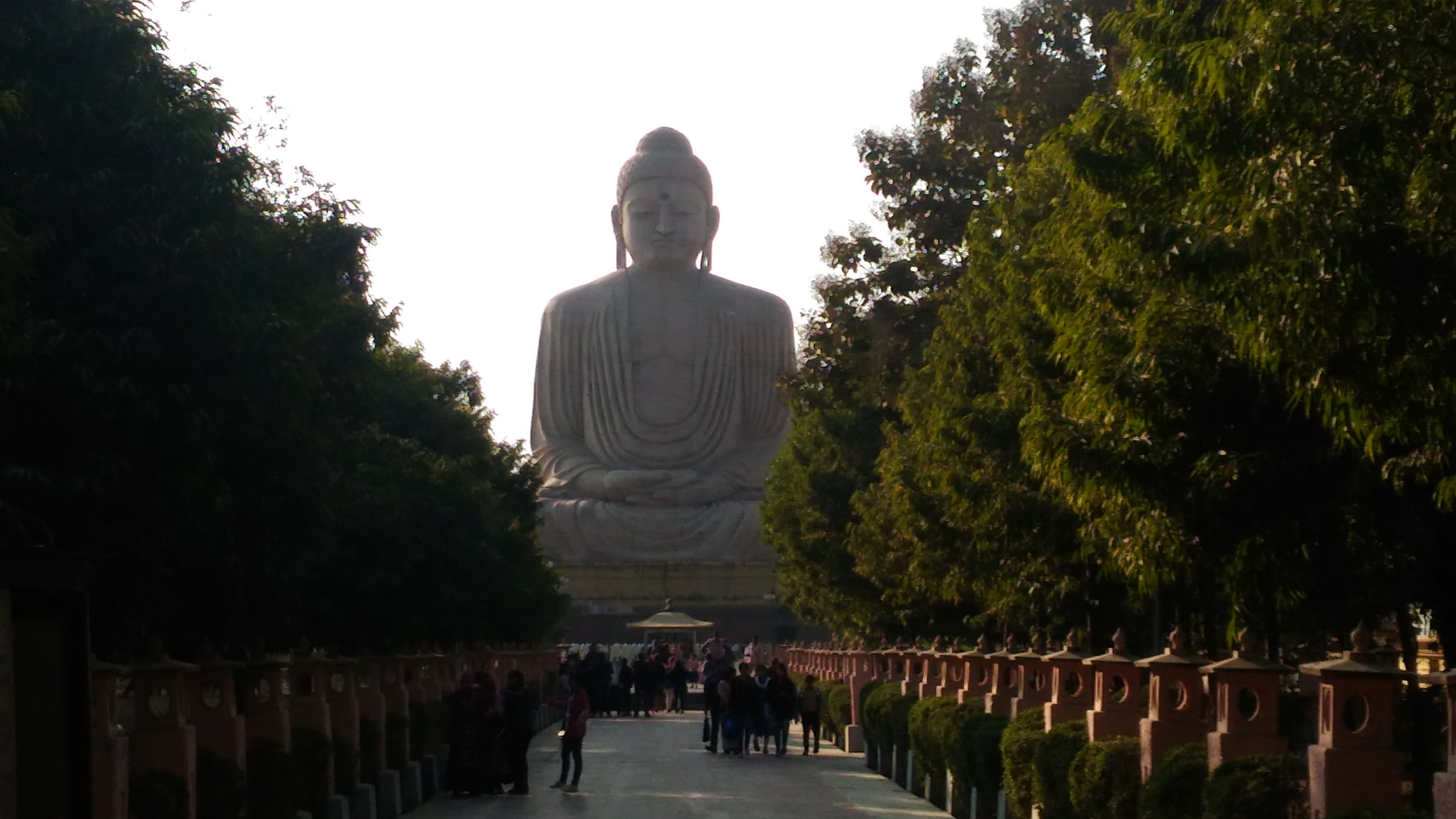
- Great Buddha Statue in Bodh Gaya
- Interactive map of Gaya district
- Country: India
- State: Bihar
- Division: Magadh
- Headquarters: Gaya
- Tehsils: 24

Government
  - District magistrate: Shri Shashank Shubhankar (IAS)
  - Lok Sabha constituencies: Gaya
  - MP/Saansad: Shri Jitan Ram Manjhi (HAM)
  - MLA/Vidhayak(Gaya Town): (Shri)Dr. Prem Kumar (BJP)

Area
  - Total: 4,976 km^{2} (1,921 sq mi)
  - Rank: 2nd in Bihar

Population (2011)
  - Total: 4,359,700
  - Density: 876.1/km^{2} (2,269/sq mi)

Demographics
  - Literacy: 63.67%
  - Sex ratio: 932♀/1000♂
- Time zone: UTC+05:30 (IST)
- PIN Code: 823001
- Major highways: NH 2, NH 82, NH 83
- Website: gaya.nic.in

Gaya district is one of the thirty-eight districts of the Indian state of Bihar. It was officially established on 3 October 1865. The district has a common boundary with the state of Jharkhand to the south. Gaya city is both the district headquarters and the second-largest city in Bihar.

== History ==
Gaya finds mention in the Hindu epics Ramayana and Mahabharata. Rama, along with Sita and Lakshmana, are stated to have visited Gaya for offering pinda-dana to their father Dasharatha. In the Mahabharata, the place has been identified as Gayapuri. In the Vayu Purana, it is stated that Gaya was the name of a demon (asura) whose body became pious after he performed rigid penance and secured blessings from Vishnu. It was said that the Gayasura's body would continue to be known as Gaya Kshetra.

Gaya has experienced the rise and fall of many dynasties in the Magadha Region. From the 6th century BC to the 18th century AD, about 2300–2400 years, Gaya has been occupying an important place in the cultural history of the region. It opened up with the Shaishunaga dynasty founded by Shishunaga, who exercised power over Patna and Gaya around 600 BC. Bimbisara, fifth in line, who lived and ruled around 519 BC, had projected Gaya to the outer world. The region was influenced by Gautama Buddha and Mahavira during the reign of Bimbisara. After a short spell of Nanda dynasty, Gaya and the entire Magadha region came under the Mauryan rule with Ashoka (272 BC – 232 BC) embracing Buddhism. He visited Gaya and built the first temple at Bodh Gaya to commemorate Prince Gautama's attainment of supreme enlightenment.

The period of Hindu revivalism commenced with the coming of the Guptas during the 4th and 5th century A.D. Samudragupta of Magadha helped to bring Gaya in limelight. It was the headquarters of the Behar district during the Gupta Empire.

Gaya then passed on to the Pala Empire with Gopala as the ruler. It is believed that the present temple of Bodh Gaya was built during the reign of Dharmapala, son of Gopala.

Gaya was in the 12th century invaded by Muhammad Bakhtiyar Khilji. The place finally passed on to the British after the battle of Buxar in 1764. Gaya district, along with other parts of the country, won freedom in 1947. Gaya is also the birthplace of eminent nationalist and the first Deputy Chief Minister of Bihar Dr. Anugrah Narain Sinha.

Gaya formed a part of the district of Behar and Ramgarh till 1864. It was given the status of independent district in 1865. Subsequently, in May 1981, Magadh Division was created by the Bihar State Government with the districts of Gaya, Nawada, Aurangabad and Jehanabad. All these districts were at the level of sub-division when the Gaya district was created in 1865.

Gaya has seen three districts partitioned off from its territory: Aurangabad and Nawada in 1976, and Jehanabad in 1988.

== Geography ==
Gaya district occupies an area of 4,976 square kilometres (1,921 sq mi), comparatively equivalent to the island of Trinidad.

Headquarters: Gaya
Area:Total 4,976 km^{2}

- Rural: 4891.48
- Urban: 84.52

Temperature: minimum 0.8 (2002 AD) degree C – maximum 49.8 (1996) degree C
Rivers: Falgu

== Politics ==
District	No.	Constituency	Name	Party	Alliance	Remarks
Gaya	225	Gurua	Upendra Prasad	BJP	NDA	
Gaya	226	Sherghati	Uday Kumar Singh	LJP(RV)	NDA	
Gaya	227	Imamganj (SC)	Deepa Manjhi	HAM(S)	NDA	
Gaya	228	Barachatti (SC)	Jyoti Devi	HAM(S)	NDA	
Gaya	229	Bodh Gaya (SC)	Kumar Sarvjeet	RJD	MGB	
Gaya	230	Gaya Town	Prem Kumar	BJP	NDA	Speaker
Gaya	231	Tikari	Ajay Dangi	RJD	MGB	
Gaya	232	Belaganj	Manorama Devi	JD(U)	NDA	
Gaya	233	Atri	Romit Kumar	HAM(S)	NDA	
Gaya	234	Wazirganj	Birendra Singh	BJP	NDA	

== Economy ==
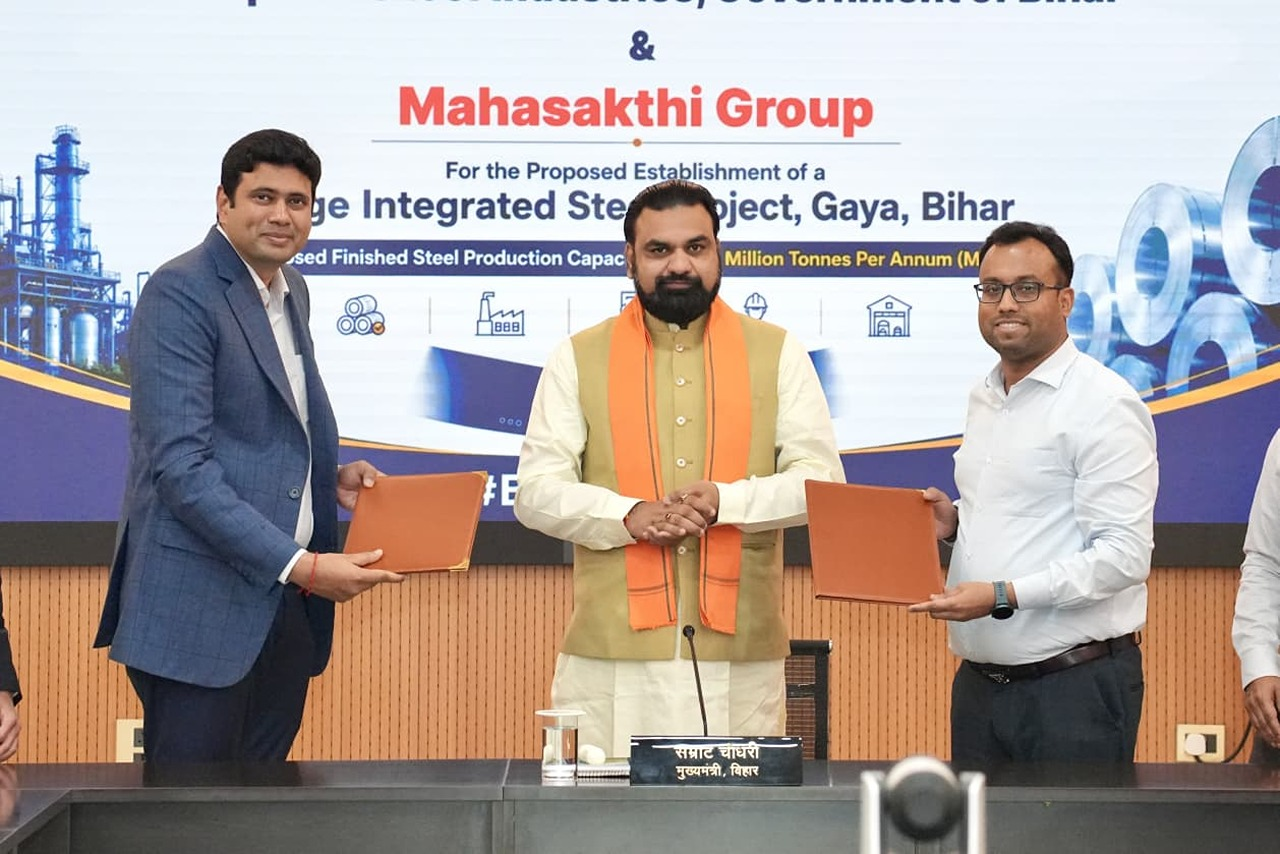
Samrat Chaudhary signing MOU with Mahashakti group for integrated steel plant in 2026.

The economy is majorly based on Tourism and Agriculture. However Gaya is also call the Manchester of Bihar, because of the textile industry.It is one of the 36 districts in Bihar currently receiving funds from the Backward Regions Grant Fund Programme (BRGF). In the year 2026, Chief Minister Samrat Chaudhary led Government of Bihar sign a Memorandum of Understanding with Mahashakti group for setting up of an Integrated Steel Plant worth 6000 crore rupees for promoting industrial development in the district.

== Divisions ==
=== Sub-divisions ===
Gaya District comprises 4 Sub-divisions and 24 Blocks:

Sub-divisions	Blocks
Gaya Sadar	Sadar Gaya
Gaya Sadar	Belaganj
Gaya Sadar	Wazirganj
Gaya Sadar	Manpur
Gaya Sadar	Bodh Gaya
Gaya Sadar	Tankuppa
Gaya Sadar	Fatehpur
Tekari	Konch
Tekari	Tekari
Tekari	Guraru
Tekari	Paraiya
Neemchak Bhatani	Khizarsarai
Neemchak Bhatani	Atri
Neemchak Bhatani	Bhatani
Neemchak Bhatani	Muhra
Sherghati	Gurua
Sherghati	Amas
Sherghati	Banke Bazar
Sherghati	Imamganj
Sherghati	Dumaria
Sherghati	Sherghati
Sherghati	Dobhi
Sherghati	Mohanpur
Sherghati	Barachatti

== Flora and fauna ==
In 1976 Gaya district became home to the Gautam Budha Wildlife Sanctuary, which has an area of 260 km^{2} (100.4 mi^{2}).

== Demographics ==
Historical population
Year	Pop.	±% p.a.
1901	791,096	—
1911	829,139	+0.47%
1921	826,039	−0.04%
1931	916,408	+1.04%
1941	1,064,854	+1.51%
1951	1,178,093	+1.02%
1961	1,392,472	+1.69%
1971	1,725,583	+2.17%
1981	2,150,406	+2.23%
1991	2,664,803	+2.17%
2001	3,473,428	+2.69%
2011	4,391,418	+2.37%

Religions in Gaya district (2011)
Religion	Percent
Hinduism	88.27%
Islam	11.12%
Other or not stated	0.61%

According to the 2011 census Gaya district has a population of 4,391,418, roughly equal to the nation of Moldova or the US state of Kentucky. This gives it a ranking of 42nd in India (out of a total of 640). The district has a population density of 880 inhabitants per square kilometre (2,300/sq mi) . Its population growth rate over the decade 2001–2011 was 26.08%. Gaya has a sex ratio of 932 females for every 1,000 males, and a literacy rate of 66.35%. 13.24% of the population lives in urban areas. Scheduled Castes and Scheduled Tribes make up 30.39% and 0.07% of the population respectively.

Languages in Gaya district (2011)
1. Hindi (51.4%)
2. Magahi (41.4%)
3. Urdu (7.04%)
4. Others (0.23%)

At the time of the 2011 Census of India, 51.36% of the population in the district spoke Hindi, 41.37% Magahi and 7.04% Urdu as their first language. The local language is Magahi.

== Education ==
Schools in Gaya are either government run schools or private schools. Schools mainly use Hindi or English as the medium of instruction. The schools are affiliated with the Bihar School Examination Board, the Central Board of Secondary Education (CBSE) or the National Institute of Open Schooling (NIOS). Under the 10+2+3/4 plan, after completing their secondary education, students typically enroll in a school with a higher secondary facility affiliated with the BSEB, the NIOS or the CBSE. Students usually choose from one of three streams — liberal arts, commerce, or science, though vocational streams are also available. Upon completing the required coursework, students may enroll in general or professional degree programmed.

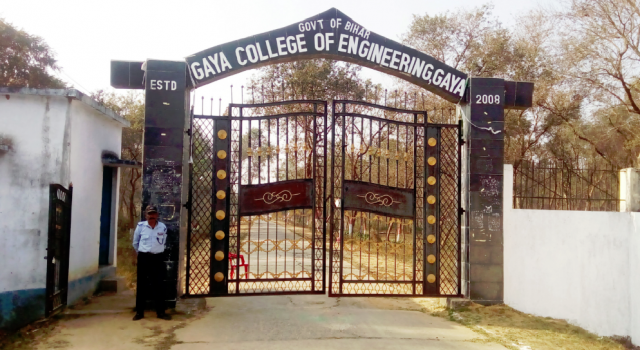
Entrance Gate Of GCE Campus

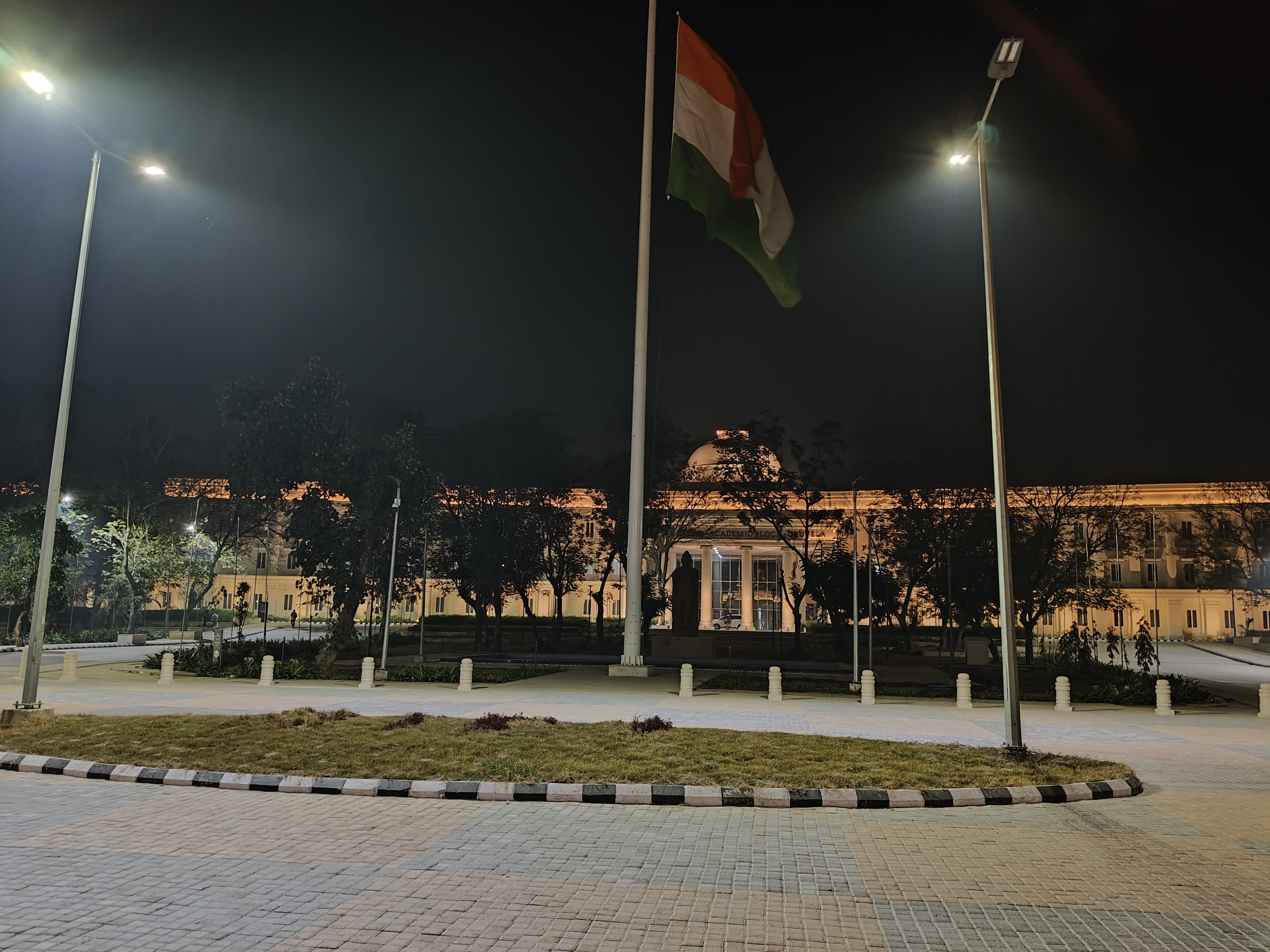
Academic Building IIM Bodhgaya

Notable institutions of higher education include:

- Central University of South Bihar
- Indian Institute of Management Bodh Gaya
- Anugrah Narayan Magadh Medical College and Hospital
- Magadh University
- Officer's Training Academy, Gaya
- Institute of Hotel Management, BodhGaya
- Gaya College
- Gaya College of Engineering
- Mirza Ghalib College

Notable schools:

- Nazareth Academy, Gaya
- PM Shri Kendriya Vidyalaya No.1, Gaya
- PM Shri Kendriya Vidyalaya No. 2, OTA, Paharpur Cantt., Gaya
- D. A. V. Public School, Cantt. Area, Gaya
- D. A. V. Public School, Manpur, Kaiya
- Crane Memorial High School, Katari Hill Road, Gaya
- Hansraj Public School, Cantt. Area, Kharanti, Gaya
- D. A. V. Public School, CR RC, Medical Road, Gaya
- Delhi Public School, Dubhal, Gaya
- Gyan Bharti Residencial Complex, Bodh Gaya

== See also ==
- List of districts of Bihar
- List of villages in Gaya district
- Nawada
- Gaya
- Patna
- Begusarai
- Lakhisarai
