= Mo =

Mo or MO may refer to:

== Arts and entertainment ==
=== Fictional characters ===
- Mo, a girl in the Horrible Histories TV series
- Mo, also known as Mortimer, in the novel Inkheart by Cornelia Funke
- Mo, in the webcomic Jesus and Mo
- Mo, the main character in the Mo's Mischief children's book series
- Mo, an ophthalmosaurus from The Land Before Time franchise
- MO (Maintenance Operator), a robot in the Filmation series Young Sentinels
- Mo, a main character in Zoey's Extraordinary Playlist
- M-O (Microbe Obliterator), a robot in the film WALL-E
- Mo the clown, played by Roy Rene, 20th-century Australian stage comedian
- Mo Effanga, in the BBC medical drama series Holby City
- Mo Harris, in the BBC soap opera EastEnders
- Little Mo Mitchell, in the BBC soap opera EastEnders

=== Films ===
- "Mo" (魔 demon), original title of The Boxer's Omen, a 1983 Hong Kong film
- Mo (2010 film), a television movie about British politician Mo Mowlam
- Mo (2016 film), a Tamil horror film

=== Music ===
- M.O. (album), a 2013 album by American hip hop artist Nelly
- M.O, an English pop trio
- MØ, a Danish singer
- The Mo, a Dutch pop band
- Mo Awards, annual awards for Australian live entertainment
- Yamaha MO, a music synthesizer

=== Other arts and entertainment ===
- Mo (Oz), a fictional country in the book The Magical Monarch of Mo by L. Frank Baum
- Mo (TV series), a 2022 comedy-drama
- Mo: A Woman's View of Watergate, a 1975 memoir of the Watergate Scandal

== Businesses and organizations ==
- Altria Group, formerly Philip Morris (New York Stock Exchange symbol MO)
- Calm Air (IATA airline designator MO), an airline based in Thompson, Manitoba, Canada
- Milicja Obywatelska, a state police institution in Poland from 1944 to 1990

== Language ==
- Mo (kana), Romanisation of the Japanese kana も and モ
- Mo language (disambiguation)
  - Deg language (Ghana)
  - Wakde language (New Guinea)
- Moldavian language (deprecated ISO 639-1 language code "mo")

== People ==
- Mo (given name)
- Emperor Mo (disambiguation), the posthumous name of various Chinese emperors
- Mo (Chinese surname)
- Mo (Korean surname)
- MØ, Danish singer songwriter Karen Marie Ørsted (born 1988)
- Mr. Mo (rapper), rapper, member of the group Jim Crow
- Mr. Mo (singer), member of the Danish band Kaliber
- Mo Twister, Filipino radio DJ and TV host Mohan Gumatay (born 1977)
- Mo Hayder, a pen name of British crime novelist Beatrice Clare Dunkel (1962–2021)
- Mo (wrestler), ring name of Robert Horne (1964–2025), professional wrestler
- Mariano Rivera, Panamaian-American retired baseball player (born 1969), nicknamed "Mo"

== Places ==
=== Norway ===
- Mo i Rana, a town in Rana Municipality, Nordland county
- Mo, Agder, a village in Vegårshei Municipality, Agder county
- Mo, Innlandet, a village in Nord-Odal Municipality, Innlandet county
- Mo, Møre og Romsdal, a village in Surnadal Municipality, Møre og Romsdal county
- Mo, Telemark, a village in Tokke Municipality in Telemark county
- Mo, Vestland, a village in Modalen Municipality, Vestland county
- Mo Municipality, a former municipality in Telemark county
- Mo Church (disambiguation), a list of several churches by this name in Norway

=== Elsewhere ===
- County Mayo, Ireland (vehicle plate code MO)
- Macau (ISO 3166-1 alpha-2 country code MO)
- Missouri, US state (postal abbreviation MO)
- Moscow Oblast, Russia
- Province of Modena, Italy (vehicle plate code MO)

== Religion ==
- Mo (divination), a traditional Tibetan Buddhist technique of divination
- Mo (religion), an animist religion of the Zhuang people of China
- Modern Orthodox Judaism, a movement that attempts to synthesize Orthodox Jewish values with the secular world

== Science and technology ==
=== Computing ===
- .mo, country code top level domain of Macau
- Magneto-optical drive (magneto-optical storage), a data storage medium
- Microsoft Office, an office software suite
- Mode of operation, in encryption block ciphers
- Motivating operation, a term describing the effectiveness of consequences in operant conditioning

=== Other uses in science and technology ===
- Mo (grist mill) (磨), ancient Chinese stone implements used to grind grain into flour
- Magnus and Oberhettinger aka "Formulas and Theorems for the Functions of Mathematical Physics", a mathematics book on special functions
- Manual override, a mechanism wherein control is taken from an automated system and given to the user
- Metalorganics, also known as organometallics, in chemistry and materials science
- Molecular orbital, a mathematical function describing the wave-like behavior of an electron in a molecule
- Molybdenum, symbol Mo, a chemical element
- Momentary open (MO), a group of electrical switches
- Thom spectrum MO, in topology

== Vehicles ==
- MO-class small guard ship, a class of small ships produced before and during World War II for the Soviet Navy
- Morris Oxford MO, an automobile produced by Morris Motors of the UK from 1948 to 1954

== Other uses ==
- Mo (Chinese zoology), a name that semantically changed from "giant panda", to "a mythical chimera", to "tapir"
- Modus operandi (abbreviation m.o.), Latin meaning "mode of operation"; distinctive behavior patterns of an entity
- Month (abbreviation mo.), a unit of time of approximately 30 days
- Operation Mo, or the Port Moresby Operation, a Japanese plan to take the Australian Territory of New Guinea during World War II
- Medical officer (disambiguation)
- The Australian English diminutive word for moustache
- Tokyo Monorail, line prefix MO
- Monday

== See also ==
- M0 (disambiguation)
- Meaux (disambiguation)
- mho, in physics, the reciprocal of the "ohm" unit of resistance
- Mø (disambiguation)
- Mobile (disambiguation)
- Moe (disambiguation)
- Moe's (disambiguation)
- Mohs (disambiguation)
- Mow (disambiguation)
