= MOH =

MOH or Moh may refer to:

== Abbreviations ==
- Medal of Honor, the United States' highest and most prestigious personal military decoration
- Medal of Honor (video game series), created by Steven Spielberg
- Medal of Honor (1999 video game)
- Maid of Honour (album), by Drake, 2026
- Medical Officer of Health, a title commonly used for the senior government official of a health department or agency
- Medication overuse headache, pain occurring when analgesics are taken frequently to relieve headaches
- Metal hydroxide
- Ministry of Health (disambiguation)
- Montgomery High School (San Diego), a public high school
- Museum of Orange Heritage, refers to Orange Order museums; Sloan's House and Schomberg House
- Music on hold, the business practice of playing recorded music to fill the silence for telephone callers placed on hold

== Moh ==
- Moh, material attachment in Sikhism, one of the five evils
- Mohu (Hungarian: Móh), a village in the Romanian commune of Șelimbăr
- Clarisse Moh (born 1986), French middle-distance runner
- Tzuong-Tsieng Moh, one of the formulators of the Abhyankar–Moh theorem

== See also ==
- MHO (disambiguation)
- Mo (disambiguation)
- Moe (disambiguation)
- Mow (disambiguation)
- Moha (disambiguation)
