= Moe =

Moe, MOE, MoE or m.o.e. may refer to:

== In arts and entertainment ==
=== Fictional characters ===
- Moe, leader of The Three Stooges, played by Moe Howard
- Moe Szyslak, from the animated television show The Simpsons
- Moe Higurashi, a supporting character in Yashahime: Princess Half-Demon
- Moe Greene, a mobster from The Godfather
- Moe, a bully from Calvin and Hobbes
- Moe Giovanni, a character first appeared in the episode "Be More" of the animated series Adventure Time

=== Other ===
- MOE. (South African singer), stage name of Motswedi Modiba
- Moe (slang) (萌え), a Japanese slang term applied to characters in video games or anime and manga
- Moe (band), often stylized as "moe.", an American jam band formed in 1989
- Moe anthropomorphism, a type of anthropomorphism in Japanese artwork
- m.o.e., short for Master of Entertainment, a Pony Canyon label for some of their anime works
- Moe!, a 1990 album by Raptori

== People ==
- Moe (given name), including nicknames
- Moe (surname)

== Places ==
=== United States ===
- Moe Township, Douglas County, Minnesota
- Moe Settlement, Wisconsin, a ghost town
- Moe Lake, Minnesota
- Moe Pond, New York

=== Elsewhere ===
- Moe, Estonia, a village
- Moe, Victoria, Australia
- Moe River (Australia), Victoria, Australia
- Moe River (rivière aux Saumons), Estrie, Quebec, Canada
- Moe Island, South Orkney Islands, Antarctica
- Mount Moe, a mountain in Canada

== Science and technology ==
- .moe, an internet top-level domain
- Mixture of experts (MoE), a machine learning technique
- Molecular Operating Environment, a software system sold by Chemical Computing Group
- Margin of error, the amount of random sampling error in the results of a survey

== Other uses ==
- Magpul Original Equipment, a designation used by the manufacturer of firearms equipment
- Margin of exposure
- Abbreviation for Ministry of Education
- Mobile station (Amtrak), Alabama, Amtrak station code MOE
- Battleships Asbjørnsen and Moe, rumored, but non-existent Norwegian ships that concerned Swedish intelligence services in 1905
- Moe (chimpanzee), a pet chimpanzee of NASCAR driver St. James and his wife LaDonna Davis
- Moe railway station, Victoria, Australia

== See also ==
- Mo (disambiguation)
- Moe's (disambiguation)
- Noe (disambiguation)
