= Trygve Moe =

Trygve Moe may refer to:

- Trygve Moe (politician) (1920–1998), Norwegian politician for the Liberal Party and the Liberal People's Party
- Trygve Moe (journalist) (1927–2025), Norwegian journalist

== See also ==
- Moe (surname)
