= Mow =

Mow may refer to:

- Meow
- Mow (surname)
- Mow, Gaya, Bihar, India
- A hayloft

== See also ==
- MOW (disambiguation)
- Mowing
- Mo (disambiguation)
- Meaux (disambiguation)
- mho
- Mohs (disambiguation)
- Men of war (disambiguation)
