= Moe (surname) =

Moe is a Norwegian toponymic surname. Notable people with the name include:

- Andreas Moe (born 1988), Swedish musician
- Andreas Moe (politician) (1883–1956), Norwegian politician
- Anna Brustad Moe (born 1975), Norwegian politician
- Anne-Leigh Gaylord Moe (born 1979), American judge
- Arild Moe (born 1955), Norwegian political scientist
- Benna Moe (1897–1983), Danish composer and musician
- Bente Moe (born 1960), Norwegian long-distance runner
- Bill Moe (1916–1998), American ice hockey player
- Bjarne Moe (1948–2019), Norwegian economist
- Bjørn Moe (born 1945), Norwegian conductor
- Bjørg Tysdal Moe (born 1954), Norwegian politician
- Dawn Moe (born 1952), Natal and South Africa cricketer
- Donald Moe (1942–2017), American politician
- Doug Moe (1938–2026), American basketball player and coach
- Eric Moe (ice hockey) (born 1988), Swedish ice hockey player
- Eric Moe (composer) (born 1954), American composer and pianist
- Finn Moe (1902–1971), Norwegian politician
- Frank Moe (1965–2022), American politician and educator
- Hal Moe (1910–2001), American football player and coach
- Jens Ulltveit-Moe (born 1942), Norwegian businessperson
- Jerry Moe, American therapist
- John Moe (born 1968), American writer and radio personality
- Josefa Moe (1933–2006), Hawaiian entertainer
- Jørgen Moe (1813–1882), Norwegian author and bishop
- Juanita Moe, American activist
- Karen Moe (born 1953), American swimmer
- Knut Moe (1921–1989), Norwegian resistance member
- Knut Ivar Moe (born 1960), Norwegian curler and coach
- Kristin Moe (1954–2023), Norwegian politician
- Lars Moe (born 1951), Norwegian veterinarian
- Michael K. Moe (born 1937), American physicist
- Mogens Moe (born 1944), Danish chess master
- Ola Borten Moe (born 1976), Norwegian politician
- Ole Moe (born 1974), Norwegian musician
- Olefine Moe (1850–1933), Norwegian opera singer
- Peter Kjeldseth Moe (1909–1973), Norwegian politician
- Per Ivar Moe, Norwegian speed skater
- Ragnvald Moe (1873–1965), Norwegian historian
- Richard Moe (1936–2025), American lawyer and politician
- Roger Moe (born 1944), American politician
- Scott Moe, current Premier of Saskatchewan, Canada
- Tarjei Sandvik Moe, Norwegian actor and star of Skam
- Terje Moe (architect), Norwegian architect
- Terje Moe (painter) (1943–2004), Norwegian painter
- Terry M. Moe (born 1949), American political scientist
- Tommy Moe (born 1970), American alpine skier
- Trygve Moe (journalist), Norwegian journalist
- Trygve Moe (politician) (1920–1998), Norwegian politician

== See also ==
- Moe (disambiguation)
- Moe (given name)
- Moen (surname)
- Moes (surname)
- Mo (Chinese surname)
- Mo (Korean surname)
- Meaux
  - note : As it was not uncommon for spellings to be simplified phonetically when immigrating to the United States. Meaux, the French surname was the origin of surname Moe** or Mow given to some of the immigrants to the United States who came from France in the 1600s. (**Different ancestry than Moe or Moen surnames of Norwegian ancestry and origin.)
