= Moe Mantha =

Moe Mantha may refer to:

- Moe Mantha, Sr. (1933–2015), Canadian ice hockey player and Progressive Conservative Party Member of Parliament for Nipissing
- Moe Mantha, Jr. (born 1961), his son, National Hockey League player and American Hockey League coach
