= Moen =

Moen may refer to:

== People ==
- Moen (surname), a list of people with the surname "Moen"

== Places ==
=== Belgium ===
- Moen, Zwevegem, a village in the municipality of Zwevegem in West Flanders

=== Denmark ===
- Moen, the anglicized spelling of Møn, an island in southeastern Denmark

=== Micronesia ===
- Weno (formerly Moen), the main island of Chuuk and of the Truk Lagoon

=== Norway ===
- Moen, Agder, a village in Risør municipality in Agder county
- Moen, Innlandet, a village in Gran municipality in Innlandet county
- Moen, Troms, a village in Målselv municipality in Troms county

== Other ==
- Moen Incorporated, a producer of faucets and fixtures

== See also ==
- Moe (disambiguation)
- Mo (disambiguation)
