= Moen (surname) =

Moen is a Norwegian toponymic surname.

== People with the surname ==
- Alexandra Moen, English actress
- Alf Daniel Moen (born 1950), Norwegian forester and politician for the Labour Party
- Alfred M. Moen (1916–2001), American inventor and founder of Moen Incorporated
- Anders Moen (1887–1966), Norwegian gymnast
- Anita Moen, (born 1967) Norwegian cross-country skier
- Ann-Helen Moen, (born 1969) Norwegian soprano
- Arjan Moen (born 1977), Dutch darts player
- Arne Vidar Moen (born 1971), Norwegian footballer
- Bernt Moen (born 1974), Norwegian musician
- Bill Moen (born 1986), American politician
- Don Moen, American singer-songwriter, pastor, and producer
- Don Moen (Canadian football), Canadian football linebacker
- Elizabeth Moen, American singer-songwriter
- Erika Moen (born 1983), American comics artist
- Fritz Moen (1941–2005), Norwegian wrongfully convicted for two distinct felony murders
- Frode Moen (born 1969), Norwegian Nordic combined skier
- Geir Moen, Norwegian sprinter
- Håvard Moen (born 1957), Norwegian footballer
- John Moen, American musician
- Judi Moen, American talk show host
- Lars Magnus Moen (1885–1964), Norwegian Minister of Education and Church Affairs
- Lars Ove Moen, Norwegian race walker
- Linda Moen, Canadian politician
- Martine Moen (born 1992), Norwegian handball player
- Odd Ivar Moen (born 1955), Norwegian businessman and footballer
- Olav Moen (1909–1995), Norwegian politician for the Liberal Party
- Ole Moen, Norwegian historian
- Øystein Moen (born 1980), Norwegian jazz pianist and composer
- Petter Moen (1901–1944), Norwegian resistance member
- Petter Vaagan Moen, Norwegian footballer
- Phyllis Moen (born 1942), American sociologist
- Rodney C. Moen, American politician
- Roger Moen (born 1966), Norwegian racing driver
- Søren Berg Sørensen Moen (1899–1946), Norwegian politician for the Labour Party
- Sigfrid Persson-Moen, Swedish missionary for the Mission Covenant Church of Sweden in China
- Sigurd Moen (1897–1967), Norwegian former speed skater and Olympic medalist
- Svein Oddvar Moen, Norwegian football referee
- Sverre Moen (1921–1987), Norwegian politician for the Christian Democratic Party
- Tollef Edward Moen (1870–1950), American politician
- Tor-Arne Moen (born 1966), Norwegian painter and writer
- Tor Odvar Moen (born 1965), Norwegian handball coach
- Travis Moen, Canadian professional ice hockey player
- Ulf Moen (born 1958), Norwegian footballer

== See also ==
- Moe (surname)
- Moen (disambiguation)
