= George Gordon (Canadian politician) =

Canadian politician

The Honourable George Gordon
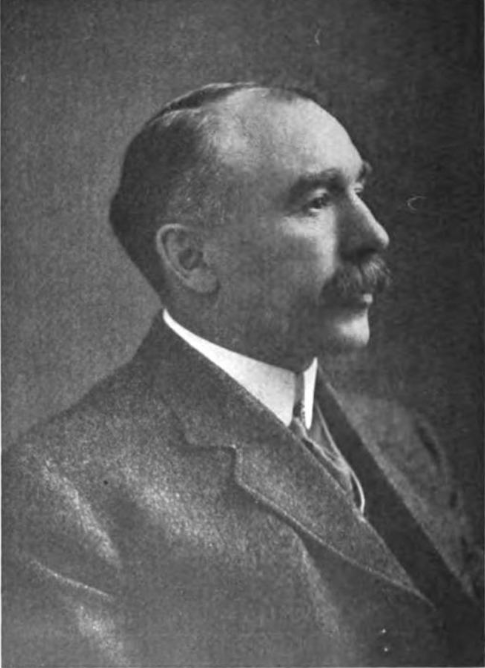

Canadian Senator from Ontario
- In office October 17, 1912 – February 3, 1942

Member of Parliament for Nipissing
- In office October 26, 1908 – October 25, 1911

Personal details
- Born: May 2, 1865 Pakenham, Canada West
- Died: February 3, 1942 (aged 76) Toronto, Ontario, Canada
- Party: Conservative
- Spouse: Alice Emma Perry (m. 1894)
- Occupation: Politician

George Gordon (May 2, 1865 – February 3, 1942) was a Canadian politician. He represented the riding of Nipissing in the House of Commons of Canada from 1908 to 1911. He was then appointed to the Senate, where he served until his death in 1942. He was a member of the Conservative Party.

== Biography ==
He was born in Pakenham, Canada West (Pakenham, Ontario), the son of Alexander Gordon and Elizabeth Fraser, and was educated in Pembroke. In 1894, he married Alice Emma Perry. Before entering politics, Gordon was a lumber merchant in Sturgeon Falls and was head of several lumber companies. He also served as a director of the Bank of Nova Scotia. Gordon ran unsuccessfully for a seat in the House of Commons in 1904 defeated by Liberal C A McCool. Gordon defeated McCool in 1908 and was reelected to the House of Commons in 1911 but resigned his seat to allow Francis Cochrane to run for election in Nipissing. Gordon died in Toronto at the age of 76.

He was the brother of John Peter Gordon, co-founder of the Sherritt Gordon Mines in Northern Manitoba.

Parliament of Canada
Preceded by Charles McCool, Liberal	Member of Parliament from Nipissing; 1908-1911	Succeeded by Francis Cochrane, Conservative
