= Moe (given name) =

The given name or nickname Moe, often short for Maurice, Moab, Morris, Mortimer, Morton, Murray, Mohammed, Moore, Moses, Mordecai, or other given names. It may refer to:

== Arts and entertainment ==
- Moe Berg (born 1959), Canadian singer-songwriter and record producer
- Moe Dunford (born 1987), Irish actor
- Moe Howard (1897–1975), American actor and comedian, leader of the Three Stooges
- Moe Jaffe (1901–1972), songwriter and bandleader
- Moe Koffman (1928–2001), Canadian flautist and saxophonist
- Moe Oshikiri (born 1979), Japanese model
- Moe Purtill (1916–1994), American swing jazz drummer
- Moe Tucker (born 1944), American musician and singer, drummer of the rock band the Velvet Underground
- Moe Kamikokuryo (born 1999), Japanese singer and member of the girl group Angerme

== Sports ==
- Moe Berg (1902–1972), American Major League Baseball catcher and spy
- Moe Drabowsky (1935–2006), American Major League Baseball pitcher
- Moe Iba (born 1939), American college basketball coach
- Moe Lemay (born 1962), Canadian retired National Hockey League player
- Moe Mantha Sr. (1933–2015), Canadian hockey player and politician
- Moe Mantha Jr. (born 1961), American retired National Hockey League player
- Moe Nagata (永田 萌絵; born 1997), Japanese women's basketball player
- Moe Norman (1929–2004), Canadian golfer
- Moe Racine (1937–2018), former Canadian Football League player, member of the Canadian Football Hall of Fame
- Moe Savransky (1929–2022), American Major League Baseball pitcher
- "Moe" Wagner (born 1997), German basketball player
- Moe Win (footballer) (born 1988), footballer from Myanmar

== Business and crime ==
- Moe Dalitz (1899–1989), American gangster and businessman
- Moe Sedway (1894–1952), Polish-American businessman and gangster
- "Moe the Gimp", nickname of American gangster Martin Snyder (1893–1981)

== Politics ==
- Moe Amery (1954–2023), Canadian politician
- Moe Mantha Sr. (1933–2015), Canadian hockey player and politician
- Moe Sihota (born 1955), Canadian former broadcaster and politician
- Moe Villeneuve (born 1932), American politician

== Academics ==
- Moe Z. Win, Burmese-American mathematician and electrical engineer

== See also ==
- Moe (disambiguation)
- Mo (given name)
- Five Guys Named Moe
