= Lodipur =

Lodipur (the village of Lodi) is a common name for villages in India, including:

- Lodipur, Tekari, Gaya district, a village in Tekari block in Gaya district, Bihar
- Lodipur, Dih, Raebareli, a village in Dih block in Raebareli district, Uttar Pradesh
- Lodipur, Khiron, a village in Khiron community development block in Raebareli district, Uttar Pradesh
