= Tekari =

Tekari Tikari
- Town
- Location in Bihar, India
- Coordinates: 24.93°N 84.83°E
- Country: India
- State: Bihar
- District: Gaya
- Elevation: 82 m (269 ft)

Population (2001)Richest man of tekari = Devanand
  - Total: 17,615

Languages Hindi, Magahi
- Time zone: UTC+5:30 (IST)
- Postal code: 824236
- ISO 3166 code: IN-BR

Tekari is a town and a municipality in Gaya district in the Indian state of Bihar and was the centre of erstwhile Tekari Raj. Maharaja Gopalsaran was the king of this area in British times. The fort is still there. It is a place of tourist's interest.

Some of the main villages in Tekari are Mow, [Bali], Maniyar Bigha, Kespa, Alipur, Bhori, Sherpura-Panchdevta, Jagdar, Supta, Law, Baidbigha, Mahmadpur, Ismailpur Bhairwa, Nimsar, Jhilmil, Jainandan Bigha, Kuseta (situated at very close distance from Tekari Subdivision and DSP Office. It is famous for historical goddess Durga temple called Devi Asthan), Jalalpur, Lodipur, Chirailly, Rewai Garh, ((Noni)), Rakasiya, Sheonagar, and Parariya, Amakuan.

== Etymology ==
In South Bihar, the representative of several communities was the Tekari family, whose great estate, Tekari Raj, in Gaya, dates back to the early 18th century. In the Mughal period, Tekari evolved as a rich estate, protected by Bhumihar kings, who were a part of the Mughal Empire. The royal emblem of the Kingdom of Tekari was a pigeon attacking over an eagle sat on the perch of a tree. Pundits concluded, "this jungle of tetris (tetri, a kind of tree) is the place where the fort should be made," and declared it very lucky. Tetri, vis-à-vis Tekari. (Tekari used to be a popular place name during the Muslim period). It perhaps indicated a place office for local administration and tax collection and residence of local chief. It may also have been a market place.

Maharaja Hit Narayan Singh of Tekari was said to have been "a man of a religious turn of mind... who became an ascetic and left his vast property in the hands of his wife" shortly after inheriting a lion's share of the estate in the 1840s.

== Demographics ==
As of 2001 India census, Tekari had a population of 17,615. Males constitute 52% of the population and females 48%. Tekari has an average literacy rate of 66%, higher than the national average of 59.5%: male literacy is 74%, and female literacy is 57%. In Tekari, 17% of the population is under 6 years of age.
