= Lodipur, Tekari, Gaya district =

Lodipur
- village
- Location in Bihar, India Lodipur (India)
- Coordinates: 24.988°N 84.815°E
- Country: India
- State: Bihar
- District: Gaya

Population
  - Total: 1,700

Languages
  - Official: Magadhi, Hindi
- Time zone: UTC+5:30 (IST)
- Telephone code: 0631
- ISO 3166 code: IN-BR
- Vehicle registration: BH02
- Nearest city: Tekari
- Literacy: 15 %
- Lok Sabha constituency: Aurangabad
- Vidhan Sabha constituency: Tekari

Lodipur is a small village in Tekari subdivision of Gaya District in the state of Bihar, India. It is about 6 km from Tekari, located on a state highway.
