= Jean-Jacques Blais =

Canadian politician

The Honourable Jean-Jacques Blais PC KC

Minister of National Defence
- In office August 12, 1983 – September 16, 1984
- Prime Minister: Pierre Trudeau; John Turner
- Preceded by: Gilles Lamontagne
- Succeeded by: Robert Coates

Minister of Supply and Services
- In office March 3, 1980 – August 11, 1983
- Prime Minister: Pierre Trudeau
- Preceded by: Roch LaSalle
- Succeeded by: Charles Lapointe

Solicitor General of Canada
- In office February 2, 1978 – June 3, 1979
- Prime Minister: Pierre Trudeau
- Preceded by: Ron Basford (acting)
- Succeeded by: Allan Lawrence

Postmaster General of Canada
- In office September 14, 1976 – February 1, 1978
- Prime Minister: Pierre Trudeau
- Preceded by: Bryce Mackasey
- Succeeded by: Gilles Lamontagne

Member of Parliament for Nipissing
- In office October 30, 1972 – September 3, 1984
- Preceded by: Carl Legault
- Succeeded by: Moe Mantha Sr.

Personal details
- Born: June 27, 1940 (age 86) Sturgeon Falls, Ontario, Canada
- Party: Liberal
- Education: University of Ottawa
- Profession: Lawyer

Jean-Jacques Blais PC KC (/ˈbleɪ/ BLAY, French: [blɛ]; born June 27, 1940) is a former Canadian politician, who represented the riding of Nipissing in the House of Commons of Canada from 1972 to 1984. He was a member of the Liberal Party of Canada.

Born in Sturgeon Falls, Ontario, Blais attended Ecole Sacré-Coeur and Sturgeon Falls High School before receiving a Bachelor of Arts degree in 1961 and a Bachelor of Laws degree in 1964 from the University of Ottawa. He was called to the Ontario Bar in 1966 and created a Queen's Counsel in 1979. In 2001, he obtained a master's degree in international law from the University of Ottawa.

First elected to the House of Commons of Canada for Nipissing in the 1972 federal election, Blais served in several cabinet posts in the government of Pierre Trudeau. He was parliamentary secretary to the President of the Privy Council from 1975 to 1976, Postmaster General from 1976 to 1978, and Solicitor General from 1978 to 1979.

Blais retained his seat when the Liberal Party was defeated by the Progressive Conservative government of Joe Clark, and returned to cabinet when the Liberals regained power in 1980. He served as Minister of Supply and Services from 1980 to 1983, and Minister of National Defence from 1983 until the 1984 election, when he lost his seat to Moe Mantha in the Progressive Conservative sweep of Brian Mulroney.

Blais subsequently returned to practicing law. In 1994, he was appointed chair of the Pearson Peacekeeping Centre, holding that position until he retired in 2002. He was the chairman of the Board of Directors of the University of Ottawa Heart Institute until 2012.

In August 2012, with the help of lawyer Mark Power, he contested the nomination of Auditor General Michael Ferguson, named in November 2011, on the grounds that, as a unilingual Anglophone, his nomination was illegal and unconstitutional. The court action refers to article 16 of the Canadian Charter of Rights and Freedoms and the Official Languages Act.

== Archives ==
There is a Jean-Jacques Blais fonds at Library and Archives Canada.

Parliament of Canada
Preceded by Carl Legault, Liberal	Member of Parliament for Nipissing; 1972–1984	Succeeded by Moe Mantha, PC
Political offices
Preceded by Roch La Salle	Minister of Supply and Services; 1980–1983	Succeeded by Charles Lapointe
Preceded by Ronald Basford (acting)	Solicitor General of Canada; 1978–1979	Succeeded by Allan Lawrence
