= Jack Garland (Canadian politician) =

Canadian politician

The Honourable Jack Garland PC

Minister of National Revenue
- In office April 22, 1963 – March 14, 1964
- Prime Minister: Lester B. Pearson
- Preceded by: Hugh John Flemming
- Succeeded by: George McIlraith (acting)

Member of Parliament for Nipissing
- In office September 15, 1949 – March 14, 1964
- Preceded by: Léo Gauthier
- Succeeded by: Carl Legault

Personal details
- Born: John Richard Garland; January 1, 1918 Smiths Falls, Ontario, Canada
- Died: March 14, 1964 (aged 46)
- Party: Liberal
- Profession: Manufacturer; manager; journalist

John Richard Garland PC (January 1, 1918 – March 14, 1964) was a Canadian politician, who was a longtime member of the House of Commons of Canada for the riding of Nipissing. He was a member of the Liberal Party of Canada.

Garland was first elected in 1949, when incumbent member Léo Gauthier moved to represent the new Sudbury riding. He was reelected in every subsequent election until his death in 1964.

Garland was appointed Minister of National Revenue in the government of Lester Pearson in 1963, and held that cabinet position when he died. He was given a state funeral.

As a member of the Queen's Privy Council for Canada he was entitled to use the honorific The Honourable.

The airport in North Bay is named Jack Garland Airport and John Garland Boulevard in Toronto were named in his memory.
