= Mo Church =

Mo Church may refer to several different churches in Norway:

- Mo Church (Innlandet), a church in Nord-Odal municipality in Innlandet county, Norway
- Mo Church (Møre og Romsdal), a church in Surnadal municipality in Møre og Romsdal county, Norway
- Mo Church (Nordland), a church in the town of Mo i Rana in Rana municipality in Nordland county, Norway
- Mo Church (Tokke), a church in Tokke municipality in Telemark county, Norway
- Mo Church (Vestland), a church in Modalen municipality in Vestland county, Norway
