= James Klock =

Canadian politician

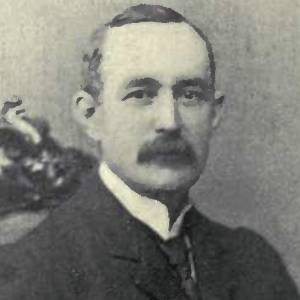
James Bell Klock

James Bell Klock (October 5, 1856 – June 14, 1927) was a Canadian politician. He represented the riding of Nipissing in the House of Commons of Canada from 1896 to 1900. He was a member of the Conservative Party.

Klock was born in Aylmer, Canada East, the son of Robert H. Klock, an early lumberman in the Ottawa Valley, and was educated in Aylmer and Berthier. Before entering politics, he was a farmer. In 1883, Klock married Alice, daughter of judge William McDougall. He was involved in the timber trade and also raised livestock. Klock took over the lumber company established by his father at Klock's Mills south of Mattawa. He was also a director of the Crystal Gold Mining Company and president of the Quinze Electric Power Company. Klock served as reeve of Cameron Township. He later married a Miss Patterson. He died in Preston, Ontario at the age of 70.

Parliament of Canada
| Preceded by first member | Member of Parliament from Nipissing; 1896–1900 | Succeeded by Charles McCool, Liberal |
