= Tekari Raj =

Zamindari estate

- Capital: Tekari
- Official languages: Magadhi
- Religion: Hinduism
  - 1709-1729(First): Raja Veer Singh
  - 1883-1958 (Last): Lt.Colonel Maharaja Sir Gopal Sharan Narayan Singh

Area
  - Total: 7,500 km^{2} (2,900 sq mi)

The Tekari Raj (sometimes spelled Tikari Raj) was a zamindari estate of the Bhumihar community in South Bihar established by Raja Veer Singh.They controlled 2,046 villages on their estate, which covered a 7,500 square kilometres (2,900 sq mi) area, near to the town of Gaya.

Rajas of Tekari like Raja Mitrajit Singh were renowned for their scholarship and for their works of poetry and history.

== History ==
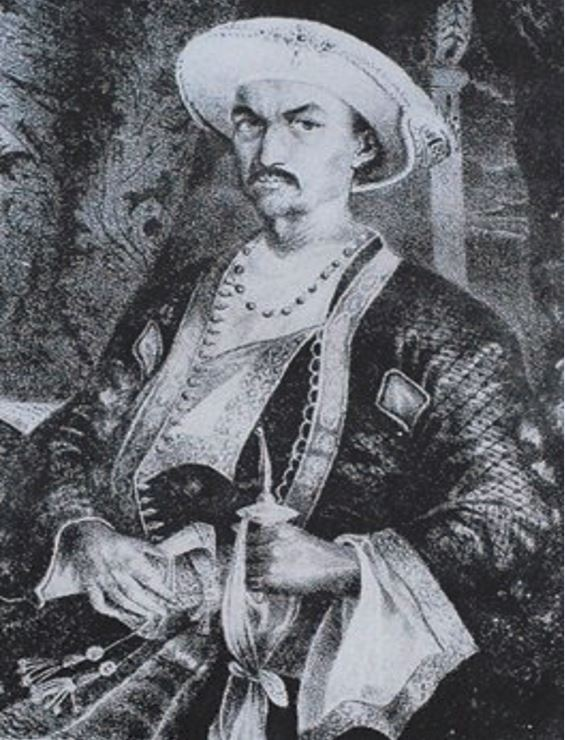
Maharaja Mitrajit Singh, Tikari Raj.

The Tekari family played an important role in the socio-economic and political history of Bihar from medieval times, during the Mughal period. Known as the Tekari Raj, their zamindari estate was situated about 15 kilometres (9.3 mi) to the west of the modern town of Gaya in the present-day state of Bihar and was surrounded by the rivers Morhar and Jamune. which no longer exists. They held their estates in Pachrukhi.

Kumkum Chatterjee says that "The zamindari of Tekari owed its origin to an imperial grant made about the time when the Mughal empire first began to decay." Dhir Singh played an important role in defeating the rebellious potentates in his neighbourhood. In recognition of the support, in 1719–20, the Mughal Emperor Muhammad Shah honoured him with a khalat and the title of Raja.

Sundar Singh, who was Dhir's son, extended the family estates through both annexation and partnership agreements. This increased influence led to recognition by the Mughals in 1738, when they gave him authority to collect revenues in various parganas. According to a history published in 1878, proved his allegiance to the Mughal court in Delhi during various battles involving the Marathas, pleasing Nawab Alivardi Khan and other Bengali subadars. Khan recommended that Singh be awarded the khalat robe as recognition of his fealty. The relationship between the declining empire and zamindars such as Sundar Singh was, however, a complex one and not always harmonious. His family had come to prominence through opportunism and Sundar sometimes found himself facing Mughal forces when he defied the imperial authority that was nominally vested in provincial governors. These local rulers needed the zamindars to collect revenue, and the zamindars sought the legitimisation that association with the empire would bring, yet the zamindars also generally refused to hand over the money they collected and they operated in a fairly lawless environment. He died in battle in 1758 after completing the fort that now exists in the town of Tekari.

Although he had no children, Sundar Singh had adopted Boniad Singh, who had been born in 1732. Boniad allied himself to the East India Company (EIC) and remained faithful to it. It was because of this that he was among the zamindars whom Mir Qasim ordered to travel to Purnea, and then in 1762 had them drowned en route in the Ganges. His death occurred when his son, Mitrajit Singh, was a few months old.

Mitrajit Singh remained under his mother's care. His abilities won for him the approval of the Mughal court at Delhi, and he was accordingly honoured with the title of Maharajah. During the "Mutiny of Kulhan", "Zillah Kharakdieh", he assisted the EIC with his own forces. He was also among those who got into some financial difficulties around the 1780s-1790s as a result of the EIC policy of extracting revenue from zamindars, known as the Permanent Settlement, but survived the crisis and, says V. C. P. Chaudhary, he nearly doubled his revenue. A contemporary writer noted that he paid 300,000 rupees to the EIC but derived 6,000,000 annually. One source of income was derived from pilgrims to the holy town of Gaya: he was entitled to 10 per cent of the fees charged to them, although in common with other major landlords he was also expected to patronise religious festivals and provide financial support for things such as temple maintenance. His house in Patna was the location of "Patna High School" from 1835. He died in 1841 and was succeeded by his eldest son, Hit Narain Singh, who had been born in 1801.

The British allowed Hit Narain Singh to use the title of Maharajah, along with its symbols. He was inclined towards religion and became an ascetic, leaving his wife to administrate his extensive properties. His wife in turn transferred it to her daughter, Maharani Rajroop Kuar, under the terms of a will dated 29 October 1877.

The Maharani's public works included construction of a temple at Patna at a cost of more than a lakh of rupees, and construction of another and also a large building adjoining it at Vrindavan. She also spent a large sum of money feeding and assisting famine-stricken people.

Maharaja Ram Kishan Singh, the adopted son of Maharaja Hit Narain Singh, succeeded him after his death in 1861 and died in 1871.

With the abolition of the zamindari system in 1950, disputes arose regarding the estate, as also happened in other areas of Bihar. There were eruptions of violence involving the Bhumihar people on the one hand and members of the Dalit, Yadav and Gareri communities on the other, most notably the beheading of a Bhumihar in 1979 that was followed by reciprocal raids on villages a few months later.

The last Maharaja was Captain Saran Narayan Singh of Bhalua Kothi. His Dewan was Syed Muhammad Amin of Itwan, Mohanpur.

== Contribution in social and cultural spheres ==
The Tekari Raj family made large contributions in the social and cultural spheres of the area. The present day Tekari Raj High School and Tekari College owe their existence to their benevolence, while the Gaya Public Library (the oldest District Library in Bihar) and the Gaya Club, which is the hub of social activity in Gaya town, stand on land donated by them.

Ram Kishan Singh spent money on various public works, including 60,000 rupees on a temple at Dharmasala(Gaya) and a further 100,000 for one at Ayodhya. He also gave Rs. 10,000 for road improvements in 1869 and a similar sum for famine relief in 1874. Rs. 2000 was given to Patna College and much land was given for roads and construction of buildings at Patna Hospital.

Ram Kishan Singh's widow, Rajroop Kuer, also contributed to public works.

- A building for Tikari school - Rs. 5000;
- Purchased government security for the maintenance of the school - Rs. 30,000;
- Her relatives, and dependents annual contribution to the school - Rs. 1000;
- Purchased books for that school through the Collector of Gaya - Rs. 1300;
- Subscription to the industrial school at Bankipore in commemoration of the visit of the Prince of Wales - Rs. 10,000;
- Has established at her cost a Pathshala in every large mauzah in her zamindari;
- A new dispensary at Tikari in honour of Her Majesty's Queen Victoria Assumption of the title, Empress of India under the name "the Empress Dispensary Tikaree" - Rs. 30,000;
- A building for the above dispensary - Rs. 6400;
- Annual subscription to Calcutta Zoological Garden - Rs. 5000;
- Annual subscription to Madras famine - Rs. 1050;
- Annual subscription for repairs of road between Tekari and Fatehpur - Rs. 16000;
- Construction and repair of ghat and tank at Masaudhi and designed with Government's sanction "Temple's Pond" - Rs. 13,000;
- Gives alms, relief, cash, clothing to the poor at Tekari to nearly 200 persons every day.

== Bibliography ==
- Bakshi, S. R.; Chaturvedi, Ritu, eds. (2007), Bihar Through the Ages, vol. 2, Sarup & Sons, ISBN 978-8-17625-798-5
- Berger, Peter; Heidemann, Frank, eds. (2013), The Modern Anthropology of India: Ethnography, Themes and Theory, Routledge, ISBN 978-1-13406-118-1
- Chatterjee, Kumkum (1996), Merchants, Politics and Society in Early Modern India: Bihar: 1733 - 1820, BRILL, ISBN 978-9-00410-303-0
- Chaudhary, V. C. P. (1980), Imperial Honeymoon with Indian Aristocracy (Appendix 15, A Brief History of the Tikaree Raj, Calcutta, 1878, pp. 1-33), K. P. Jayaswal Research Institute
- Prakash, Gyan (2003), Bonded Histories: Genealogies of Labor Servitude in Colonial India (Reprinted ed.), Cambridge University Press, ISBN 978-0-52152-658-6
- Yang, Anand A. (1999), Bazaar India: Markets, Society, and the Colonial State in Bihar, University of California Press, ISBN 978-0-52091-996-9
