= Moha =

Moha may refer to:

== Places ==
- Moha, Belgium, a village in the municipality of Wanze, province of Liège, Belgium
  - County of Moha, medieval fief based on the village in Belgium
- Moha, British Columbia, a rural locality located in British Columbia, Canada
- Moha, Hungary, a village in Hungary
- Mohovo (Hungarian: Moha), a village in Croatia

== People ==
- Bob Moha (1890–1959), American middleweight boxer
- Moha El Yaagoubi (born 1977), Moroccan footballer
- Moha Rharsalla (born 1993), Moroccan–Spanish football player
- Moha (footballer, born 1997), Moroccan footballer
- Moha (footballer, born 1999), Moroccan footballer

== Other uses ==
- Mohā, a sanskrit word often rendered as 'delusion'
- Moha (Buddhism), a state in which the mind is not clear, one of the three poisons of Buddhism
- Moha (tree), Madhuca longifolia
- Wat Moha Montrey, a monastery temple in Phnom Penh, Cambodia
- Moha (meme), an internet meme spoofing Jiang Zemin

== See also ==
- MOH (disambiguation)
