= Rakasiya =

- village
- Country: India
- State: Bihar
- District: Gaya

Government
  - Body: Tekari Municipality

Population
  - Total: 1,500

Languages
  - Official: Magadhi, Hindi
- Time zone: UTC+5:30 (IST)
- PIN: 824236
- Telephone code: 0631
- ISO 3166 code: IN-BR
- Nearest city: Tekari
- Sex ratio: 65 : 35 ♂/♀
- Literacy: 60%%
- Vidhan Sabha constituency: Tekari
- Civic agency: Tekari Municipality
- Climate: Tropical (Summer Max. 46 deg C, Winter Min.3 deg C) (Köppen)

Rakasiya is an old village in the Gaya district in the Indian state of Bihar. Located northwest of Manpur, it is approximately 3 km from the town of Tekari, towards Nimsar Dam. Rakasiya is on the bank of the Morhar river, and has a population of around 1500.

The village has been very progressive right from the 1960s with some eminent freedom fighters and veteran politician such as Hardeo Narain Singh who hailed from this village.

The village has a mix of all castes and creeds with a very good synergy between them, evident in that the entire village is under a common platform, the Gram Vikas Samiti (GVS), Rakasiya established in 2000, for improving the living conditions of the villagers. The Gram Vikas Samiti has been instrumental in:

- the Tekari - Soladham Road ( approximately 10 km)
- bringing electricity to the village thru the Rajiv Gandhi Gramin Viduytikaran Yojna (RGGVY)
- revival of old State Tubewell of Rakasiya from the Tubewell Division
- restructuring of canal irrigation
- improvement of medical facility at Rakasiya PHC
- upgrading the old Rakasiya Primary School to Middle/High School status
- organising Agricultural Workshop at the Village & Ammakuan Panchayat to provide the farmers with the latest technologies
- formation of SHG's (Self Help Groups) and Income generation schemes with help of NGO's and Voluntary organisations to make the village youth self-reliant and discourage migration to bigger cities for livelihood.
- creation of Farmer's Club.
- establishing the e-Sewa Kendra in the village for providing valuable information via Internet.
