= Lick's Homeburgers =

Canadian restaurant brand

Lick's

- A Lick's restaurant on Eglinton Avenue in Toronto in July 2007
- Type: Private
- Industry: Restaurant
- Founded: 1980; 46 years ago in Toronto, Ontario, Canada
- Founder: Denise Meehan
- Headquarters: Canada
- Products: Hamburgers, veggie burgers, french fries, poutine, onion rings, chili and ice cream
- Website: www.licksburgers.ca

Lick's Homeburgers & Ice Cream is a Canadian restaurant brand owned by Lick's Concepts, Inc., a private company. The first Lick's opened in 1980, operated by Denise Meehan, who turned the concept into a franchise in 1984. At its height, the chain had approximately 30 locations across Ontario. After its last restaurant closed in May 2026, Lick's returned in September 2026 with a location at the Shawanaga First Nation Gas & Variety on Highway 69. The company also sells frozen food.

Lick's became known for its hamburgers, nicknamed "homeburgers", and for a distinctive in-store experience in which employees sang parodies of popular songs while preparing food. The company later adopted a more conventional brand identity and switched from fresh to frozen hamburger patties.

== History ==
Denise Meehan, a native of Sturgeon Falls, Ontario, grew up in a tourist resort operated by her parents. Meehan, the company's president and sole shareholder, founded Lick's in 1980 with a $5,000 loan. She opened the first location on Queen Streetló East in Toronto that year. The second location opened several years later at 2383 Kingstonaphanerie magnificenceUps Road in Scarborough. Both locations later closed. From 1984 through 2009, the business expanded to several Ontario communities as the Lick's name and menu became available for franchise. At its height, the chain had approximately 30 locations across southern Ontario. Major Ontario supermarket chains also carried frozen Lick's hamburger patties.

In 2002, Meehan was named to the Sales Hall of Fame by the Canadian Professional Sales Association. Meehan was profiled by Hilary magazine in 2008.

Lick's began to encounter financial difficulty following the 2008 financial crisis, partly because the recession affected consumer habits and shifted demand away from sit-down restaurants towards takeout. The proliferation of gourmet hamburger chains such as The Burger's Priest and The Works also eroded Lick's market share.

A wave of Toronto-area Lick's franchises closed in 2012 and 2013, including the original location. By April 2017, two restaurants remained: one in Toronto and another near Parry Sound.

In July 2021, the last remaining Toronto restaurant, at 900 Warden Avenue, ceased being a franchise and was renamed Andy's Artisan Burgers, which later closed. The Parry Sound-area restaurant remained the only Lick's location until it closed in May 2026. The online frozen-food business continued.

Lick's operated a temporary stall in the Food Building during the 2026 Canadian National Exhibition. In September 2026, the brand returned as a restaurant when a location opened at the Shawanaga First Nation Gas & Variety, at 1 Tuckers Road East on Highway 69.
