= Mo (given name) =

Mo may be a nickname for Maura, Maureen, Maurice, Marek, Monica, Morris, Mohammed, Moses, Mortimer, or other given names. It is more rarely a given name in its own right.

People with the name include:

== Arts and media ==
- Mohammed Amer, Palestinian-American stand-up comedian
- Mohamed Amin (1943–1996), Kenyan photojournalist
- Mo Dean (born 1945), American memoirist and novelist
- Mo Gaffney (born 1958), American actress, comedian, writer and activist
- Mo Jamil, British singer who won the sixth series of The Voice UK
- Mo Rocca (born 1969), American writer, comedian, and political satirist
- Mo Willems (born 1968), American writer, animator, and creator of children's books
- Mo Gilligan (born 1988), British stand-up comedian and television personality.

== Government and politics ==
- Mo Brooks (born 1954), American politician from Alabama
- Mo Mowlam (1949–2005), British politician
- Mo Udall (1922–1998), U.S. Representative and former presidential candidate
- Wei Mo (793–858), official of the Chinese Tang dynasty
- Zhao Mo (died 122 BC), second ruler of the southeast Asian kingdom of Nanyue
- Zhongli Mo (died 201 BC), Chinese general

== Sport ==
- Mo Farah (born 1983), British long-distance runner
- Mo Johnston (born 1963), Scottish former footballer
- Mo Martin (born 1982), American professional golfer
- Maurice Purify (born 1986), American football player
- Mohamed Salah (born 1992), Egyptian professional footballer who plays for Liverpool FC
- Mo Vaughn (born 1967), American baseball player
- Mariano Rivera, relief pitcher for the New York Yankees
- Maureen Connolly (1934–1969), American tennis player known as "Little Mo"
- Monique Jones, American professional bodybuilder nicknamed "Mo"

== Other fields ==
- Mo, nickname for Moses David, pen name of David Berg (1919–1994), American cult leader
- Mo Ibrahim (born 1946), Sudanese–British businessman
- Mozi or Mo Tzi (c. 470–c. 390 BC), Chinese philosopher

== In fiction ==
- Mo (Monica Testa), lead character of Alison Bechdel's strip Dykes to Watch Out For

== See also ==
- Moe (given name)
- Mo (disambiguation)
