= Charles McCool =

Canadian politician

Charles Arthur McCool
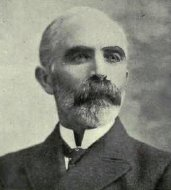

Member of the Canadian Parliament for Nipissing
- In office 1900–1908
- Preceded by: James Klock
- Succeeded by: George Gordon

Personal details
- Born: February 27, 1853 Chichester, Canada East
- Died: March 19, 1926 (aged 73)
- Party: Liberal
- Relations: Frank Charles McGee, Grandson

Charles Arthur McCool (February 27, 1853 – March 19, 1926) was a Canadian politician. He represented the riding of Nipissing in the House of Commons of Canada from 1900 to 1908. He was a member of the Liberal Party.

McCool, a lumber merchant before entering politics, was born in Chichester, Canada East (Chichester, Quebec) .
