= Léo Gauthier =

Canadian politician (1904–1964)

MP for Nipissing
- In office 1945–1949
- Preceded by: Raoul Hurtubise
- Succeeded by: Jack Garland

MP for Sudbury
- In office 1949–1953
- Preceded by: first member
- Succeeded by: Rodger Mitchell

MP for Nickel Belt
- In office 1953–1958
- Preceded by: first member
- Succeeded by: Osias Godin

Personal details
- Born: Jeremiah Léoda Gauthier; 29 December 1904 Copper Cliff, Ontario
- Died: 17 January 1964 (aged 59) Sudbury, Ontario
- Party: Liberal

Jeremiah Léoda Gauthier (29 December 1904 – 17 January 1964) was a Canadian Member of Parliament from 1945 to 1958. A member of the Liberal Party caucus, he represented three different ridings over the course of his career as the city of Sudbury grew in size and importance to warrant one, and then two, ridings of its own.

== Background ==
Born in Copper Cliff, Ontario, Gauthier owned a lumber company in the Sudbury area, and was one of the founding shareholders in Sudbury Broadcasting, F. Baxter Ricard's radio company which established CHNO and CFBR. He was active in politics as an organizer, and as campaign manager for provincial MPP James Cooper.

He also served on the boards of the Sudbury Wolves and the Victorian Order of Nurses.

== Political career ==
In the 1945 election, he was first elected to represent the riding of Nipissing, which he represented for a single term. In 1947, he was one of several MPs from Northern Ontario who lobbied the government to provide tax relief to the region's gold mines. The following year, he was one of six MPs who demanded that the government of Mackenzie King reinstitute food subsidies and remove the sales tax from food, to counter the rising cost of living and the emerging power of the Co-operative Commonwealth Federation.

In the 1949 election, he shifted to the new riding of Sudbury, which he also represented for a single term. In the 1953 election, he became the first MP for Nickel Belt,

During his time as an MP, he played a role in securing government funding for the construction of the Sudbury Airport, although he raised a public objection when he did not receive a formal invitation to the airport's official opening in 1954.

He was reelected in the 1957 election, which resulted in the election of John Diefenbaker's short-lived minority government, but retired at the 1958 election for health reasons.

He died on 17 January 1964, at Memorial Hospital in Sudbury.
