= Nipissing (federal electoral district) =

Former federal electoral district in Ontario, Canada

Coordinates: 46.19°N 79.14°W

Ontario electoral district

Defunct federal electoral district
- Legislature: House of Commons
- First contested: 1896
- Last contested: 2004

Demographics
- Census division(s): Nipissing District, Parry Sound
- Census subdivision(s): Bonfield, Callander, East Ferris, Mattawa, North Bay, Temagami, West Nipissing

Nipissing was a federal electoral district that was represented in the House of Commons of Canada from 1896 to 2004. It was located in the northeastern part of Ontario, Canada.

When it was first created, the riding took in the eastern half of Northeastern Ontario, including the towns of North Bay and Sudbury. Before 1892, this region was part of the electoral district of Renfrew North.

It initially consisted of the temporary judicial district of Nipissing, and the townships of Head, Clara and Maria in the county of Renfrew, and a part of the district of Algoma.

In 1892, it was redefined to consist of the townships of Airey, Appleby, Awrey, Badgerow, Ballantyne, Biggar, Bishop, Blezard, Bonfield, Boulter, Bower, Boyd, Broder, Butt, Caldwell, Calvin, Cameron, Canisbay, Chisholm, Clara, Deacon, Devine, Dill, Dryden, Dunnet, Ferris, Field, Finlayson, Fitzgerald, French, Freswick, Grant, Hagar, Hawley, Head, Hugel, Hunter, Kirkpatrick, Lauder, Lister, Lorrain, Lyell, Maria, Mattawan, McCraney, McKim, McLaughlin, Merrick, Mulock, Murchison, Neelon, Olrig, Osler, Papineau, Paxton, Peck, Pentland, Phelps, Ratter, Robinson, Sabine, Springer, Widdifield and Wilkes, and a broad swath of northeastern Ontario between Georgian Bay and Hudson Bay/James Bay.

In 1903, it was redefined to consist of the territorial district of Nipissing, and the townships of Clara, Head and Maria in the county of Renfrew. In 1914, it was defined to consist of the territorial district of Nipissing, the eastern part of the territorial district of Sudbury, and the townships of Clara, Head and Maria in the county of Renfrew. In 1924, it was defined to consist of the southwest part of the territorial district of Nipissing, and the southeast part of the territorial district of Sudbury.

In 1947, it was defined to consist of the eastern part of the territorial district of Sudbury and the territorial district of Nipissing, excluding he townships of Ballantyne, Wilkes, Pentland, Boyd and Cameron and all townships south of them. Sudbury riding was created from the western portion of Nipissing.

In 1976, it was defined to consist of the northwest part of the Territorial District of Nipissing. In 1996, it was defined to consist of parts of the northeastern part of the Territorial District of Parry Sound, and the western part of the Territorial District of Nipissing.

The electoral district was abolished in 2003 when it was merged into Nipissing—Timiskaming riding.

== Members of Parliament ==
This riding elected the following members of the House of Commons of Canada:

Parliament	Years	Member	Party
Riding created from Renfrew North
8th	1896–1900	James Klock	Conservative
9th	1900–1904	Charles McCool	Liberal
10th	1904–1908	Charles McCool	Liberal
11th	1908–1911	George Gordon	Conservative
12th	1911–1911	George Gordon	Conservative
12th	1911–1917	Francis Cochrane	Conservative
13th	1917–1921	Charles Robert Harrison	Government (Unionist)
14th	1921–1925	Edmond Lapierre	Liberal
15th	1925–1926	Edmond Lapierre	Liberal
16th	1926–1930	Edmond Lapierre	Liberal
17th	1930–1935	Raoul Hurtubise	Liberal
18th	1935–1940	Raoul Hurtubise	Liberal
19th	1940–1945	Raoul Hurtubise	Liberal
20th	1945–1949	Léo Gauthier	Liberal
21st	1949–1953	Jack Garland	Liberal
22nd	1953–1957	Jack Garland	Liberal
23rd	1957–1958	Jack Garland	Liberal
24th	1958–1962	Jack Garland	Liberal
25th	1962–1963	Jack Garland	Liberal
26th	1963–1964†	Jack Garland	Liberal
26th	1964–1965	Carl Legault	Liberal
27th	1965–1968	Carl Legault	Liberal
28th	1968–1972	Carl Legault	Liberal
29th	1972–1974	Jean-Jacques Blais	Liberal
30th	1974–1979	Jean-Jacques Blais	Liberal
31st	1979–1980	Jean-Jacques Blais	Liberal
32nd	1980–1984	Jean-Jacques Blais	Liberal
33rd	1984–1988	Moe Mantha Sr.	Progressive Conservative
34th	1988–1993	Bob Wood	Liberal
35th	1993–1997	Bob Wood	Liberal
36th	1997–2000	Bob Wood	Liberal
37th	2000–2004	Bob Wood	Liberal
Riding dissolved into Nipissing—Timiskaming

== Electoral history ==
1896 Canadian federal election
Party	Candidate	Votes
Conservative	James Klock	2,477
Liberal	James Conmee	1,513

1900 Canadian federal election
Party	Candidate	Votes
Liberal	Charles McCool	acclaimed

1904 Canadian federal election
Party	Candidate	Votes
Liberal	Charles McCool	2,747
Conservative	George Gordon	2,559

1908 Canadian federal election
Party	Candidate	Votes
Conservative	George Gordon	4,301
Liberal	Charles McCool	4,280

1911 Canadian federal election
Party	Candidate	Votes
Conservative	George Gordon	5,872
Liberal	Alfred James Young	5,327

On Mr. Gordon's resignation, 25 October 1911:

By-election on 8 November 1911
Party	Candidate	Votes
Conservative	Francis Cochrane	acclaimed

1917 Canadian federal election
Party	Candidate	Votes
Government (Unionist)	Charles Robert Harrison	6,411
Opposition (Laurier Liberals)	Edmond Lapierre	6,367

1921 Canadian federal election
Party	Candidate	Votes
Liberal	Edmond Lapierre	9,886
Conservative	Charles Robert Harrison	5,589
Progressive	Benoni Levert	3,280

1925 Canadian federal election
Party	Candidate	Votes
Liberal	Edmond Lapierre	9,128
Conservative	John Fergusson	9,031

1926 Canadian federal election
Party	Candidate	Votes
Liberal	Edmond Lapierre	11,587
Conservative	Alfred Laberge	8,963

1930 Canadian federal election
Party	Candidate	Votes
Liberal	Raoul Hurtubise	12,588
Conservative	Henri Morel	10,437
Communist	Amos Tobias Hill	531

1935 Canadian federal election
Party	Candidate	Votes
Liberal	Raoul Hurtubise	20,114
Conservative	John Michael McNamara	7,991
Co-operative Commonwealth	Joseph Levert	2,236
Reconstruction	Kelvin Alexander Stewart	2,007
Communist	Amos Tobias Hill	931

1940 Canadian federal election
Party	Candidate	Votes
Liberal	Raoul Hurtubise	26,916
National Government	Onésime Larocque	11,229

1945 Canadian federal election
Party	Candidate	Votes
Liberal	Léo Gauthier	17,416
Co-operative Commonwealth	J. Benonie Levert	11,349
Progressive Conservative	Welland Gemmell	10,437
Bloc populaire	Lionel Campeau	3,538
Labor–Progressive	Clarence Smith	1,525
Social Credit	John Loudon Shaw	1,379

1949 Canadian federal election
Party	Candidate	Votes
Liberal	Jack Garland	11,061
Progressive Conservative	Avit Seguin	4,836
Co-operative Commonwealth	Merle Dickerson	3,663
Social Credit	John L. Shaw	1,552
Union des électeurs	Rolland Champagne	489

1953 Canadian federal election
Party	Candidate	Votes
Liberal	Jack Garland	12,415
Progressive Conservative	Thomas Merton Palmer	5,329
Co-operative Commonwealth	MacDonald Hector Reid	1,637
Independent Liberal	Lionel Laframboise	216

1957 Canadian federal election
Party	Candidate	Votes
Liberal	Jack Garland	12,528
Progressive Conservative	Thomas Merton Palmer	7,351
Co-operative Commonwealth	William Arthur Dickinson	1,999

1958 Canadian federal election
Party	Candidate	Votes
Liberal	Jack Garland	15,046
Progressive Conservative	Johnston Albert Kennedy	10,422
Co-operative Commonwealth	Leonard Herbert Thomas	1,242

1962 Canadian federal election
Party	Candidate	Votes
Liberal	Jack Garland	17,164
Progressive Conservative	Gary Shaw	7,127
New Democratic	Bill Kowalchuk	2,573
Ralliement créditiste	Raymond Larocque	631

1963 Canadian federal election
Party	Candidate	Votes
Liberal	Jack Garland	16,547
Progressive Conservative	Cecil Hewitt	7,283
New Democratic	Bill Kowalchuk	2,351
Ralliement créditiste	Raymond Larocque	1,587

On Mr. Garland's death, 14 March 1964:

By-election on 22 June 1964
Party	Candidate	Votes
Liberal	Carl Legault	14,002
Progressive Conservative	Dick Donnelly	8,581
New Democratic	Harry MacKay	3,581

1965 Canadian federal election
Party	Candidate	Votes
Liberal	Carl Legault	14,025
Progressive Conservative	Norman Lavallee	5,653
New Democratic	Bill Kowalchuk	4,763

1968 Canadian federal election
Party	Candidate	Votes
Liberal	Carl Legault	13,524
Progressive Conservative	Bruce J. Goulet	8,412
New Democratic	Bob Price	3,267

1972 Canadian federal election
Party	Candidate	Votes
Liberal	Jean-Jacques Blais	12,451
Progressive Conservative	Jack Smylie	10,812
New Democratic	Jack Wynter	6,276
Ralliement créditiste	Clem Larochelle	457

1974 Canadian federal election
Party	Candidate	Votes
Liberal	Jean-Jacques Blais	16,549
Progressive Conservative	Jack Smylie	8,609
New Democratic	Mike O'Hallarn	5,477

1979 Canadian federal election
Party	Candidate	Votes
Liberal	Jean-Jacques Blais	15,184
Progressive Conservative	Marie Marchand	12,987
New Democratic	Patricia Hughes	5,681

1980 Canadian federal election
Party	Candidate	Votes
Liberal	Jean-Jacques Blais	16,394
Progressive Conservative	Marie Marchand	11,661
New Democratic	Art Peltomaa	4,515

1984 Canadian federal election
Party	Candidate	Votes
Progressive Conservative	Moe Mantha Sr.	17,247
Liberal	Jean-Jacques Blais	14,558
New Democratic	Lynne Bennett	4,735

1988 Canadian federal election
Party	Candidate	Votes
Liberal	Bob Wood	15,488
Progressive Conservative	Moe Mantha Sr.	15,003
New Democratic	Dawson Pratt	6,479
Confederation of Regions	Tim Quinlan	522
Independent	David C. Brown	187

1993 Canadian federal election
Party	Candidate	Votes
Liberal	Bob Wood	25,285
Reform	Geraldine Lightfoot	6,791
Progressive Conservative	Moe Mantha Sr.	6,565
New Democratic	Arthur James Campbell	1,324
Natural Law	Manon Charleen Isabelle	214
Abolitionist	Alcide Hamelin	73

1997 Canadian federal election
Party	Candidate	Votes
Liberal	Bob Wood	19,786
Reform	Laurie Kidd	7,390
Progressive Conservative	Gord Miller	5,666
New Democratic	Art Campbell	2,280

2000 Canadian federal election
Party	Candidate	Votes
Liberal	Bob Wood	18,888
Alliance	Ken Ferron	7,461
Progressive Conservative	Alan Dayes	4,192
New Democratic	Wendy Young	2,572

== See also ==
- List of Canadian electoral districts
- Historical federal electoral districts of Canada
