= Carl Legault =

Canadian politician

- Official 1968 portrait

MP for Nipissing
- In office 1964–1972
- Preceded by: Jack Garland
- Succeeded by: Jean-Jacques Blais,

Personal details
- Born: January 2, 1923 Sturgeon Falls, Ontario, Canada
- Died: March 12, 1983 (aged 60) Ottawa, Ontario, Canada
- Party: Liberal
- Spouse(s): Gilberte Dompierre (m. 14 Oct 1946)

Carl Legault (January 2, 1923 – March 12, 1983) was a Canadian politician. He represented the riding of Nipissing in the House of Commons of Canada from 1964 to 1972. He represented the Liberal Party.

Before entering politics, Legault was a furniture retailer in Sturgeon Falls.

He was first elected in a 1964 byelection, following the death of the district's longtime MP Jack Garland. He was reelected in the 1965 and 1968 elections, and then retired from politics in 1972. He died in 1983 and was buried at Sturgeon Falls.

His dad, Théodore Legault, represented Sturgeon Falls in the Legislative Assembly of Ontario from 1926 to 1929 as an Independent-Liberal and then Nipissing as a Liberal member from 1934 until his death in 1935.
