= Willow Brook (Otsego Lake tributary) =

- Location of the mouth of Willow Brook Willow Brook (Otsego Lake tributary) (the United States)

Location
- Country: United States
- State: New York
- Region: Central New York Region
- County: Otsego
- Town: Otsego

Physical characteristics
- Source: Moe Pond
  - location: NW of Cooperstown
  - coordinates: 42°42′51″N 74°56′42″W
  - elevation: 1,627 ft (496 m)
- Mouth: Otsego Lake
  - location: Cooperstown
  - coordinates: 42°42′12″N 74°55′23″W
  - elevation: 1,188 ft (362 m)

Basin features
- Progression: Willow Brook → Otsego Lake → Susquehanna River → Chesapeake Bay → Atlantic Ocean

Willow Brook is a river in Otsego County, New York. It drains out of Moe Pond, flows through Cooperstown, and empties into Otsego Lake.
