= Charles Robert Harrison =

Canadian politician

MP for Nipissing
- In office March 18, 1918 – October 4, 1921
- Preceded by: Francis Cochrane
- Succeeded by: Edmond Lapierre

MPP for Nipissing
- In office October 29, 1930 – April 3, 1934
- Preceded by: Henri Morel
- Succeeded by: Théodore Legault

Personal details
- Born: July 3, 1868 Frodingham, Lincolnshire, England
- Died: February 7, 1946 (aged 77)
- Party: Unionist/Conservative

Charles Robert Harrison (July 3, 1868 – February 7, 1946) was a Canadian politician. He represented the riding of Nipissing in the House of Commons of Canada from 1917 to 1921. He was a Conservative member of Robert Borden's Unionist caucus.

Harrison, who was born in Frodingham, Lincolnshire, England, was a train conductor before entering politics.

He served only a single term, and was defeated by Edmond Lapierre in the 1921 election. He subsequently served a term in the Legislative Assembly of Ontario, representing the provincial electoral district of Nipissing from 1930 to 1934 as a member of the Conservatives.
