= Edmond Lapierre =

Canadian politician (1866–1960)

Edmond Anthony Lapierre

Member of Parliament for Nipissing
- In office 1921–1930
- Preceded by: Charles Robert Harrison
- Succeeded by: Raoul Hurtubise

MPP for Sudbury
- In office 1934–1937
- Preceded by: Charles McCrea
- Succeeded by: James Cooper

Personal details
- Born: 25 January 1866 Montreal, Canada East
- Died: 20 June 1960 (aged 94)
- Party: Liberal Party of Canada; Ontario Liberal Party

Edmond Anthony Lapierre (25 January 1866 – 20 June 1960) was a Liberal party member of the House of Commons of Canada. He was born in Montreal and became a sales representative.

Lapierre attended St. Mary's Academy in Montreal. He worked with Greenshields in that city for 18 years. Moving to northern Ontario, he became a member of Sudbury's Board of Trade and was a director of the Mattawa Fur Company, and served on various associations.

He was first elected to Parliament at the Nipissing riding in the 1921 general election after an unsuccessful campaign as a Laurier Liberal there in the 1917 election. He became the first French-speaking representative at the federal level from Northern Ontario. Lapierre was re-elected in 1925 over Conservative candidate John Ferguson, and in 1926 over Conservative candidate and former Sudbury mayor Alfred Laberge. He left federal politics at the end of his term in the 16th Canadian Parliament and did not seek another term in the 1930 election. He was subsequently a member of the Legislative Assembly of Ontario for the provincial Liberals from 1934 to 1937.
