= Raoul Hurtubise =

Canadian politician

The Honourable Raoul Hurtubise

Canadian Senator from Ontario
- In office 1945–1955
- Appointed by: William Lyon Mackenzie King

Member of Parliament for Nipissing
- In office 1930–1945
- Preceded by: Edmond Lapierre
- Succeeded by: Léo Gauthier

Personal details
- Born: Joseph Raoul Hurtubise; July 1, 1882 Ste-Anne de Prescott, Ontario, Canada
- Died: January 31, 1955 (aged 72)
- Party: Liberal

Joseph Raoul Hurtubise (July 1, 1882 – January 31, 1955) was a Canadian politician. He represented the riding of Nipissing in the House of Commons of Canada from 1930 to 1945. He was a member of the Liberal Party.

== Background ==
Before entering politics, Hurtubise was a surgeon.

He left electoral politics in 1945, when he was appointed to the Senate. He sat as a senator until his death in 1955.

== Sources ==
- Raoul Hurtubise – Parliament of Canada biography
