= Mount Ovis =

Mountain in New York, United States

- Location within New York Location within the United States

Highest point
- Elevation: 1,824 feet (556 m)
- Coordinates: 42°43′05″N 74°56′21″W

Geography
- Location: Cooperstown, New York City
- Topo map: USGS

Mount Ovis is a mountain in Central New York region of New York by Cooperstown. It was named around 1813, by James Fenimore Cooper's grandfather, who kept on it some of the first imported Merino sheep (Ovis aries). One was a famous ram named Sinbad, that was killed by falling into the well. Moe Pond is located west of Mount Ovis.
