= Hannah's Hill =

Mountain in New York, United States

- Location within New York Location within the United States

Highest point
- Elevation: 1,664 feet (507 m)
- Coordinates: 42°42′26″N 74°56′05″W

Geography
- Location: Cooperstown, New York City
- Topo map: USGS

Hannah's Hill also known as Irish Hill is a mountain in the Central New York region of New York by Cooperstown. It is named after Hannah Cooper who died at age 23 after a fall from a horse. Moe Pond is located northwest of Hannah's Hill.
