= Alfred Laberge =

Canadian politician (1893–1964)

Joseph Alfred Laberge
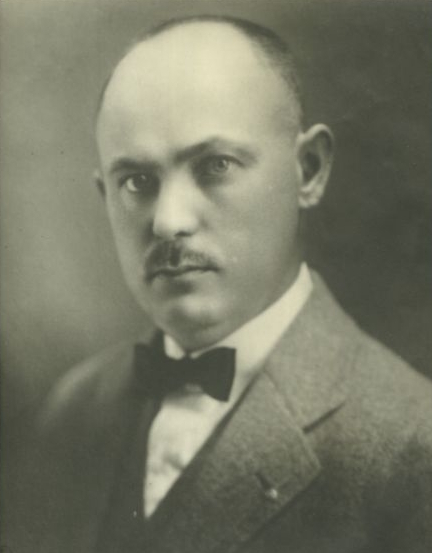
- Laberge, c. 1920

Mayor of Sudbury, Ontario
- In office 1920–1921
- Preceded by: Percy Morrison
- Succeeded by: Robert Arthur

Personal details
- Born: February 16, 1893 Sudbury, Ontario, Canada
- Died: March 27, 1964 (aged 71) Westmount, Quebec, Canada
- Occupation: Lumber merchant

Joseph Alfred (Fred) Laberge (February 16, 1893 - March 27, 1964) was a Canadian politician, who served as mayor of Sudbury, Ontario in 1920 and 1921.

Laberge was the son of Jean-Baptiste Laberge, who founded the Laberge Lumber Company and constructed many of the earliest buildings in Sudbury. He later took over management of the company from his father.

Elected mayor in 1920, Laberge was at 27 years old the youngest mayor ever elected in Sudbury at that point. He was also the first mayor to have been born in Sudbury, and the first francophone to hold the mayoralty since Francis Lemieux in 1903. His election marked at least a temporary end to linguistic tensions between the city's anglophone and francophone communities initiated by the Conscription Crisis of 1917, and ironically occurred just one year after the first municipal election in the city's history in which francophone candidates had failed to win a single seat on council.

Following his term as mayor, Laberge ran for the Conservative nomination in Nipissing in the 1925 federal election, but was subjected to a blackmail attempt by Elzéar Cousineau, who wrote him an anonymous letter demanding a $2,000 payout. Laberge turned the letter over to the police, and on their advice left a dummy package in Cousineau's requested location, and Cousineau was arrested when he arrived to retrieve the package.

Despite Cousineau's arrest, however, Laberge withdrew from the nomination race in favour of John Ferguson. Ferguson failed on election day to defeat incumbent MP Edmond Lapierre; Laberge was selected as the party's candidate in the subsequent 1926 election, but also lost to Lapierre.

After his retirement from the lumber business, Laberge moved to Montreal, Quebec, and died at his home in Westmount on March 27, 1964.
