= Sheonagar =

- village
- Location in Bihar, India Sheonagar (India)
- Coordinates: 24.93°N 84.83°E
- Country: India
- State: Bihar
- District: Gaya

Languages
  - Official: Magadhi, Hindi
- Time zone: UTC+5:30 (IST)
- ISO 3166 code: IN-BR
- Nearest city: Tekari

Sheonagar is a large village 3 km south of Tekari in the Gaya district of Bihar state, India. Its population is about 5000. It is now the largest panchayat in terms of area as well as population.

In 2010, a temple is constructed which is popularly said "DEVI STHAN" by the villagers. The marble used in this temple is said to be imported from new Zealand. Another famous and 100 years old Shiva temple is under construction as per by contribution by the villagers.

The field encircling the village is very fertile either for Ravi as well as kharif crops.

This village has a +2level school as well as many private tuition by the educated person at nominal fee.

A big playground is located in the heart of the village for the encouragement of sports.
