= Bob Wood (MP) =

Canadian politician (1940–2025)

Member of Parliament for Nipissing
- In office 1988–2004
- Preceded by: Moe Mantha
- Succeeded by: Anthony Rota

Personal details
- Born: March 11, 1940 Ayer's Cliff, Quebec, Canada
- Died: April 13, 2025 (aged 85) North Bay, Ontario, Canada
- Party: Liberal
- Occupation: Radio broadcaster; politician

Bob Wood (March 11, 1940 – April 12, 2025) was a Canadian politician. Wood represented the riding of Nipissing in the House of Commons from 1988 to 2004 as a member of the Liberal Party. Wood did not stand for re-election in the 2004 election.

Wood was born in Ayer's Cliff, Quebec. Prior to entering politics, he served with RCAF from 1959–1964 before his long career as a radio broadcaster in Sherbrooke, Quebec (CKTS) and North Bay, Ontario (CFCH). Wood was also Deputy Mayor (1975–1976) and councillor (1975–1978) in North Bay. He died in North Bay on April 12, 2025, at the age of 85.
