= Mo Church (Møre og Romsdal) =

Church in Møre og Romsdal, Norway

- Mo kirke
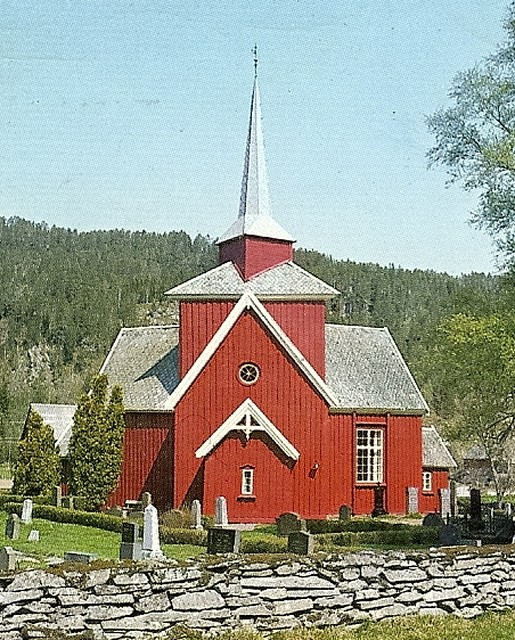
- View of the church
- Mo Church
- 63°00′00″N 8°58′04″E
- Location: Surnadal Municipality, Møre og Romsdal
- Country: Norway
- Denomination: Church of Norway
- Churchmanship: Evangelical Lutheran

History
- Status: Parish church
- Founded: 13th century
- Consecrated: 1728

Architecture
- Functional status: Active
- Architect: Erik Jakobsen Holten
- Architectural type: Y-shaped
- Completed: 1728 (298 years ago)

Specifications
- Capacity: 205
- Materials: Wood

Administration
- Diocese: Møre bispedømme
- Deanery: Indre Nordmøre prosti
- Parish: Mo
- Norwegian Cultural Heritage Site
- Type: Church
- Status: Automatically protected
- ID: 84963

Mo Church (Norwegian: Mo kirke) is one of the five existing Y-shaped churches in Norway. It is a parish church of the Church of Norway in Surnadal Municipality in Møre og Romsdal county, Norway. It is located in the village of Mo in the upper Surnadalen valley. It is the church for the Mo parish which is part of the Indre Nordmøre prosti (deanery) in the Diocese of Møre. The red, wooden church was built in the rare Y-shaped design in 1728 using plans drawn up by the architect Erik Jakobsen Holten. The church seats about 205 people.

== History ==
The earliest existing historical records of the church date back to 1589, but it was not new that year. The first church at Mo was a stave church that was located on the same site as the present-day church. The church was possibly founded in the 13th century. Possible burial mounds from the Viking Age dating back to around the year 1000 are located near the church. In 1648, the old church received an addition to the north, changing it from a long church design to half of a cruciform design with a transept on the north side of the nave. A few years after that, a new church porch was added as well. In 1703, a new sacristy was built on the east side of the building. In 1727, the building was deemed to be in dire need of replacement. It was torn down that year and replaced with a new church on the same site in 1728.

The new church was built in a unique Y-shaped design in 1728. It has a church porch on the southwest end, a sacristy in the east, and a baptismal sacristy in the northwest. The church was designed by Erik Jakobsen Holten from Bøverdalen. As a Y-shaped church, there are three wings. The choir and sacristy are in the east wing and the two western wings were for seating. Of the two western wings, the northern one was originally seating for females (and the baptismal sacristy is attached to that wind) and the southern one was seating for men and the church porch was at the end of that wing. There is a central tower above the intersection of the three wings. The altarpiece is from 1685 and was transferred from the stave church, without the artist's name being known.

== Media gallery ==
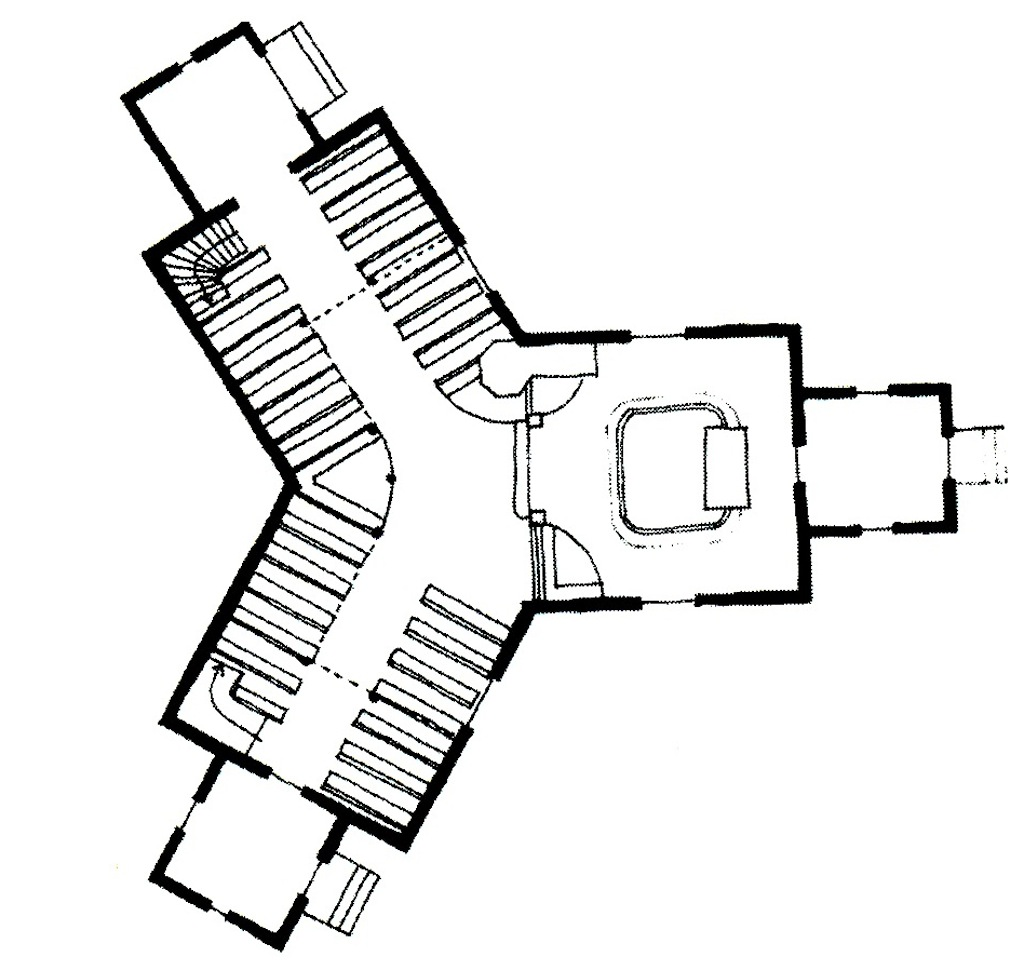

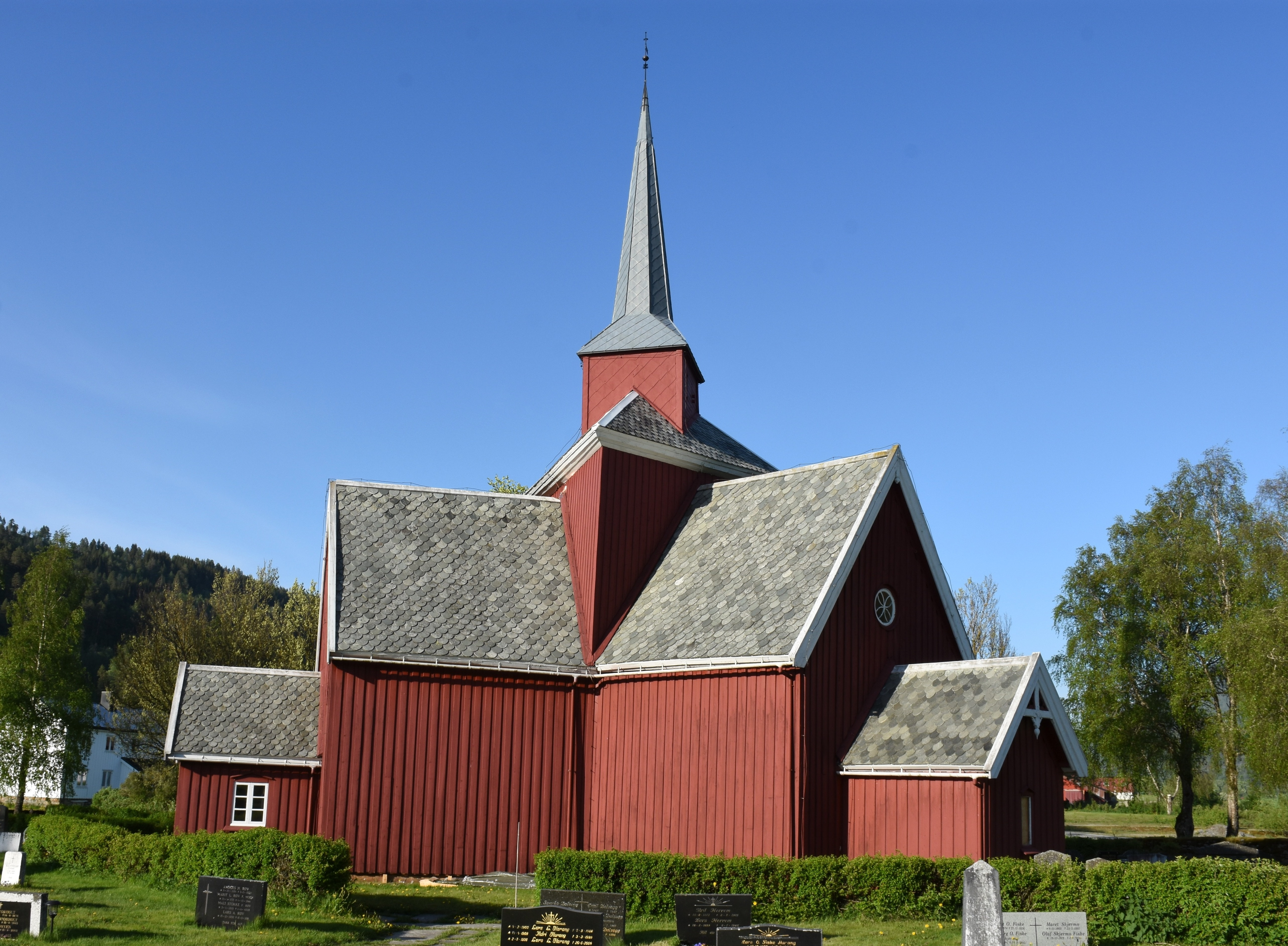

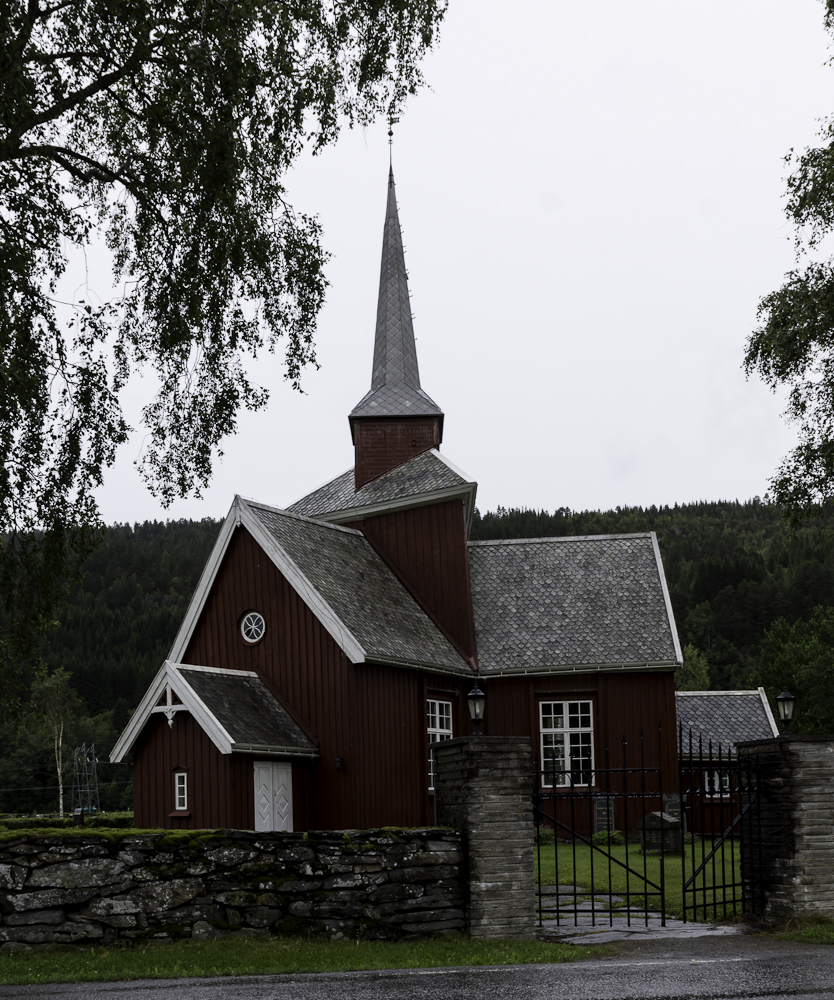

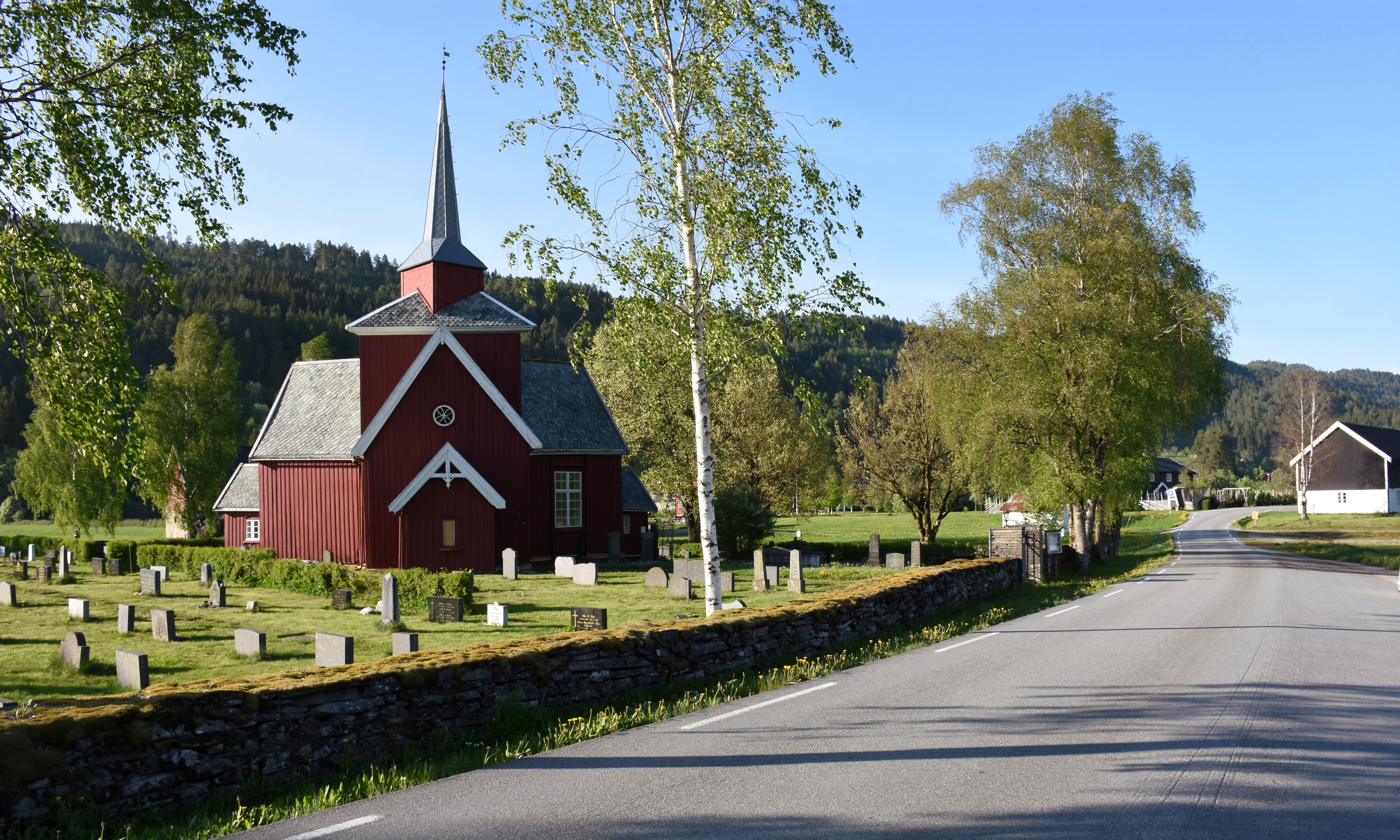

== See also ==
- List of churches in Møre
