= Moe Lake =

Lake in the state of Minnesota, United States

- Location within Minnesota
- Location: Clay County, Minnesota
- Coordinates: 46°52′29″N 96°11′54″W
- Type: lake

Moe Lake is a lake in Clay County, Minnesota, in the United States.

Moe Lake was named for Nels R. Moe, a pioneer farmer who settled there.

== See also ==
- List of lakes in Minnesota
