= Margin of exposure =

Risk assessment ratio in toxicology

In toxicology, the margin of exposure (or MOE) of a substance is the ratio of its no-observed-adverse-effect level to its theoretical, predicted, or estimated dose or concentration of human intake. It is used in risk assessment to determine the dangerousness of substances for which a conventional health based/guidance value (HBGV) (such as the Tolerable Weekly Intake) cannot be established. The MOE approach was formalized for European regulatory use by the European Food Safety Authority (EFSA) in 2005, specifically for substances that are both genotoxic and carcinogenic, as an alternative to mathematical low-dose extrapolation models and to the principle of reducing exposure as low as reasonably achievable (ALARA). Since then, the MOE approach has been extended to other substance classes, with the terminology being further standardized in a 2025 EFSA statement.

The MOE is calculated as the ratio between a toxicological reference point derived from a dose-response relationship and the estimated human exposure to the substance. Therefore, a larger MOE indicates a greater distance between the dose at which adverse effects are observed and the dose to which humans are exposed, being associated with lower concern.

== Background and motivation ==
=== Limitations of the ALARA principle ===
Before the adoption of MOE in 2005, the standard regulatory advice in Europe for genotoxic and carcinogenic substances was the ALARA ("As Low As Reasonably Achievable"). While the ALARA principle is based on the assumption that there is not safe dose for direct-acting genotoxic carcinogens, it was recognized as unpractical and inadequate for practical risk management. This is because it does not provide any basis for comparison of relative risk of different substances and therefore, it does not allow setting priorities for regulatory action based on the magnitude of the concern. ALARA is purely based on hazard identification, ignoring carcinogenic potency and actual human exposure, not being able to distinguish between high and low-concern substances. This is particularly ineffective when considering unavoidable contaminants such as acrylamide, aromatic amines, or other process‑related genotoxicants.

=== Limitations of low-dose extrapolation ===
Another alternative approach used by some regulatory agencies, involves mathematically extrapolating animal carcigenicity data to the low doses relevant for human exposure. However, EFSA concluded that this type of extrapolation is fundamentally problematic because:

- It is rarely known whether any given animal or mathematical model can reflect the underlying biological processed existent at lower doses of exposure. This is because many "low-dose" risk models are based on DNA damage and mutations measured at high doses, which may not reflect the biological response at low doses, where repair, apoptosis, immune stimulation and other defenses are more active. Moreover, evidence for thresholds or sublinear responses at low doses (including adaptive and protective effects) means simple linear scaling from high to low doses can misrepresent true risk.
- Results can vary by several orders of magnitude depending on the models used, with the actual obtained experimental data having little influence on the result.
- In the case of Endocrine Disruptors and other mixtures, these can show non-monotonic curves, from which extrapolating linearity from high doses can substantially underestimate low-dose effects or miss them entirely.

== Definition and calculation ==
=== Basic formula ===
As defined by EFSA, the MOE is the ratio between the Reference Point (RP) and the estimated human exposure:

$$MOE = {\operatorname{Reference\,Point\,(RP)}\!\over\operatorname{Estimated\,Human\,Exposure}\!}$$

Both the RP and the exposure must be expressed in the same units (typically micrograms or miligrams per kilogram of body weight per day (µg/kg bw/day or mg/kg bw/day).

The Reference Point is a dose derived from an experimental or observational dose-response relationship that reflects the critical toxicological effect. Unlike the NOAEL-based approach, the RP in the MOE framework does not imply the existence of a safe threshold, it is simply a defined point on the dose-response curve used for comparative purposes.

=== Reference points (RP) ===
EFSA's preferred RP for genotoxic carcinogens is the BMDL_{10} - the benchmark dose lower confidence limit corresponding to a 10% increase in tumor incidence compared to control. This is because, using the lower confidence limit incorporates the statistical uncertainty of the study and ensures with a 95% confidence that the chosen BMDL is not exceeded at that dose.

Moreover the Benchmark Dose approach is preferred as it uses all data points on the dose response curve, and is less sensitive to study design choices such as dose spacing. However, when the data is insufficient to derive a BMDL_{10}, EFSA recommends the usage of the T25 - the dose producing a 25% tumor incidence in animals. In other situations, one can use as a reference point the NOAEL (no-observed-adverse-effect-level) and the LOAEL (lowest-observed-adverse-effect-level), particularly for non-genotoxic substances where a BMDL cannot be derived, or where a HBGV (Health-based Guidance Value) is not appropriate.

=== Human exposure estimation ===
The exposure estimate used in the denominator of the MOE should reflect chronic average intake, since the animal dose–response data on which the RP is based are typically derived from lifetime studies with daily dosing. EFSA recommends providing a range of exposure scenarios covering: the general population and consumers-only subgroups; mean and median intakes; and high-exposure percentiles (90th, 95th, 97.5th, 99th) with associated uncertainty estimates. These values are usually available on several consumption databases, mainly on the EFSA Comprehensive European Food Consumption Database, and are derived from country-specific dietary assessments.

== Interpretation ==
The MOE, as a numerical number does not directly represent a probability of harm, but rather the relative distance between the dose response reference point and the human exposure. EFSA has come up with a threshold of 10,000 for genotoxic carcinogens, This value of 10,000 is derived from various sources of uncertainty considered by EFSA. Three main sources of uncertainty were identified:

- Inter-species differences (extrapolation from experimental data on animals to humans) and intra-species differences (individual human variability), which are accommodated by a 10-fold factor each (100-fold total)
- Additional uncertainties specific to genotoxic carcinogens, derived from individual differences in DNA repair capacity and cell cycle control. An additional 10-fold factor is considered to account for this.
- Uncertainty around the BMDL result, as it is not a threshold, as effects can occur below it. An additional 10-fold factor is considered to account for this.

Combining these three factors yields a total uncertainty factor or 10,000 (100×10×10). EFSA therefore concluded that a MOE of 10,000 or greater generally shows a substance is of low concern from a public health perspective, and it may be considered a low priority for risk management action. It is to note that a MOE of 10,000 would not be considered of low concern in circumstances of greater uncertainty such as when T25 is used instead of BMDL_{10}.

== MOE versus MOS (margin of safety) ==
The Margin of Safety (MOS) is a related concept to MOE. MOS is used interchangeably to MOE by some regulating bodies, while others define it differently. Typically its defined as the ratio between a HBGV (such as TWI - Tolerable Weekly Intake) and the estimated exposure. This distinction means that the MOS considers the existence of a safe threshold, while the MOE does not.

To avoid confusing between these 2 terms, EFSA has standardized its use of MOE as the primary term across all its research and publications, further discontinuing the use of MOS in a 2025 statement.

== Limitations and criticism ==
The MOE approach has several acknowledges limitations. It does not directly quantify the risk of cancer, neither a probability of harm. This means it cant be used to communicate risk in absolute terms to the public. The choice of a reference point also substantially affects the MOE: a T25-based MOE will be numerically different from a BMDL_{10}-based MOE for the same substance. Moreover, the 10,000 threshold, while scientifically motivated, ultimately reflects a policy judgement about acceptable levels of uncertainty, rather than a biological boundary.

Additionally, the approach was developed for a single substance. To approach this, EFSA created cumulative assessment tools, such as the MOET (Margin of Exposure Total), calculated as the reciprocal of the sum of the reciprocals of the individual substance MOEs. Exposure estimation at higher percentiles also becomes increasingly unreliable due to sparse data on the distribution tails.
