= Emperor Mo =

Emperor Mo (末帝; Mòdì; "The Last Emperor") is a posthumous name typically given to the last emperors of Chinese imperial dynasties, who were without other posthumous names. It may refer to:

- Sun Hao (243–284, reigned 264–280), Emperor Mo of Wu
- Zhu Youzhen (888–923, reigned 913–923), Emperor Mo of Later Liang
- Li Congke (885–936, reigned 934–936), Emperor Mo of Later Tang
- Emperor Mo of Western Xia (died 1227, reigned 1226–1227)
- Emperor Mo of Jin (died 1234, reigned in 1234)
- Puyi (1906–1967, reigned 1909–1912)
