= Mount Moe =

Mountain in British Columbia, Canada

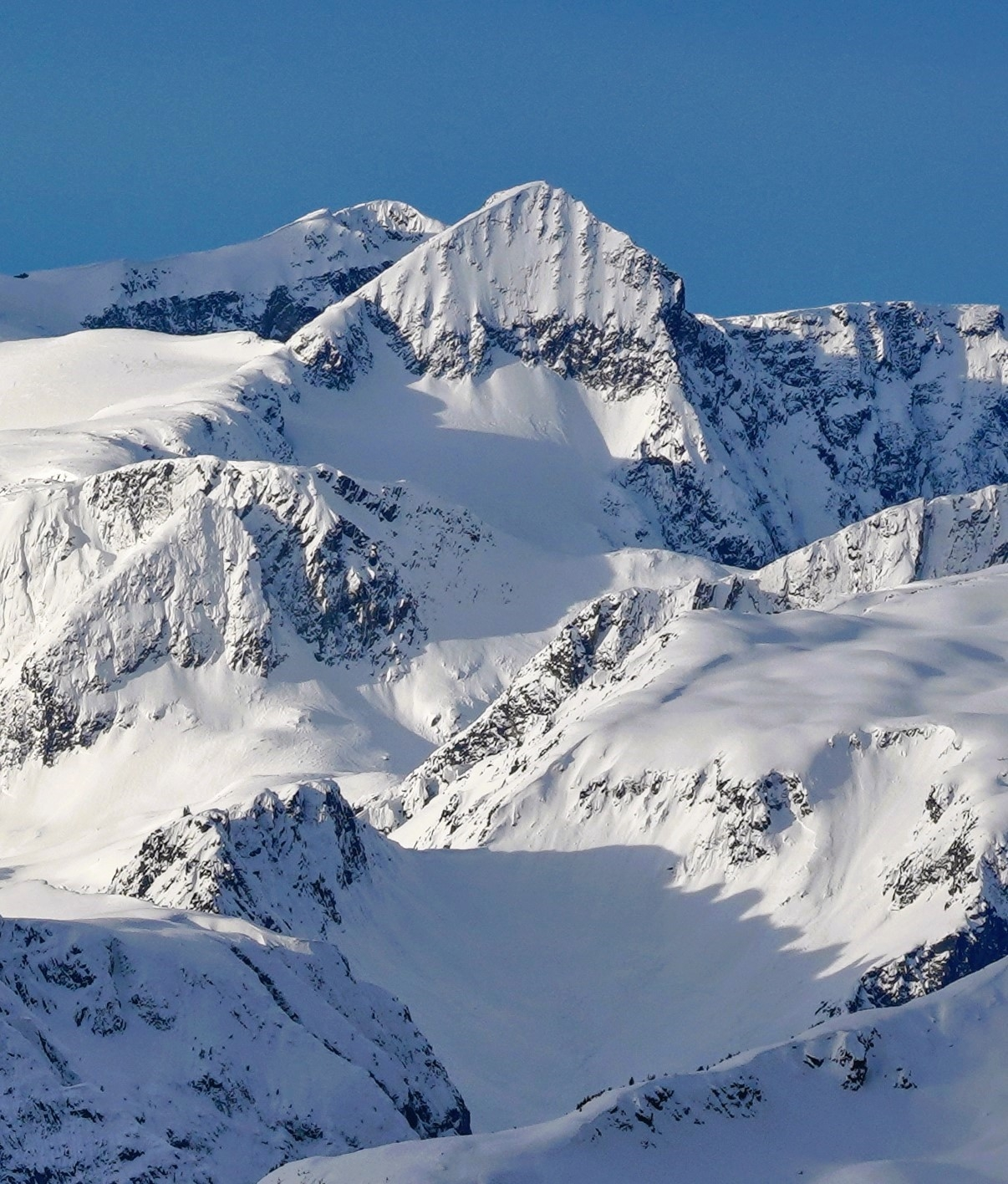
- Northeast face, from Mt. Taylor

Highest point
- Elevation: 2,664 m (8,740 ft)
- Prominence: 145 m (476 ft)
- Parent peak: Mount Weart
- Isolation: 1.23 km (0.76 mi)
- Listing: Mountains of British Columbia
- Coordinates: 50°10′52″N 122°47′15″W

Geography
- Location within British Columbia Location within Canada
- Location: British Columbia, Canada
- District: New Westminster Land District
- Protected area: Garibaldi Provincial Park
- Parent range: Coast Mountains
- Topo map: NTS 92J2 Whistler

Climbing
- First ascent: 1967
- Easiest route: class 3 scrambling

Mount Moe is a 2,664-metre (8,740-foot) glaciated summit in British Columbia, Canada.

== Description ==
Mount Moe is located in the Coast Mountains, and 18 kilometres (11 mi) northeast of Whistler in Garibaldi Provincial Park. Precipitation runoff and glacial meltwater from this mountain's slopes drains into tributaries of the Lillooet River. Mount Moe is notable for its steep rise above local terrain as topographic relief is significant with the summit rising 2,100 metres (6,900 ft) above the Green River in six kilometres (3.7 mi). The first ascent of the summit was made in 1967 by C. Jennings and J. Nairn. The toponym was officially adopted on February 27, 1978, by the Geographical Names Board of Canada.

== Climate ==
Based on the Köppen climate classification, Mount Moe is located in the marine west coast climate zone of western North America. Most weather fronts originate in the Pacific Ocean, and travel east toward the Coast Mountains where they are forced upward by the range (orographic lift), causing them to drop their moisture in the form of rain or snowfall. As a result, the Coast Mountains experience high precipitation, especially during the winter months in the form of snowfall. Winter temperatures can drop below −20 °C with wind chill factors below −30 °C. This climate supports the Weart Glacier surrounding the peak. The months of July and August offer the most favorable weather for climbing Mount Moe.

== See also ==
- Geography of British Columbia
- Geology of British Columbia

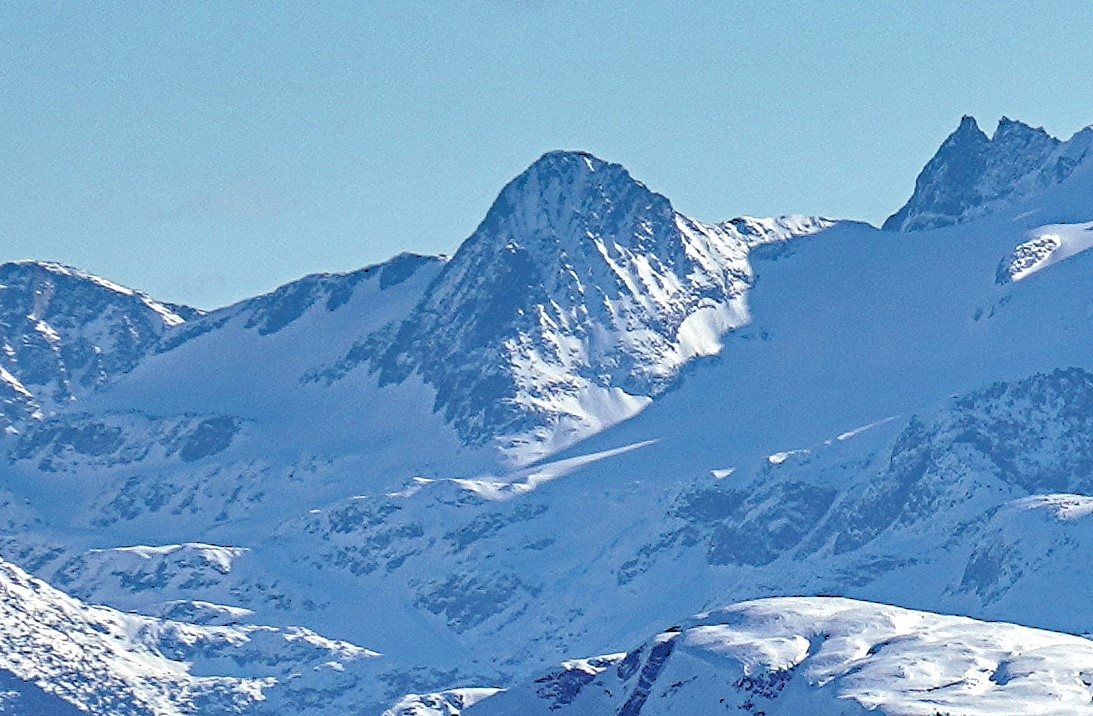
Northwest aspect viewed from Pemberton Icefield
