= Lodipur, Dih, Raebareli =

Lodipur Lodīpur
- Village
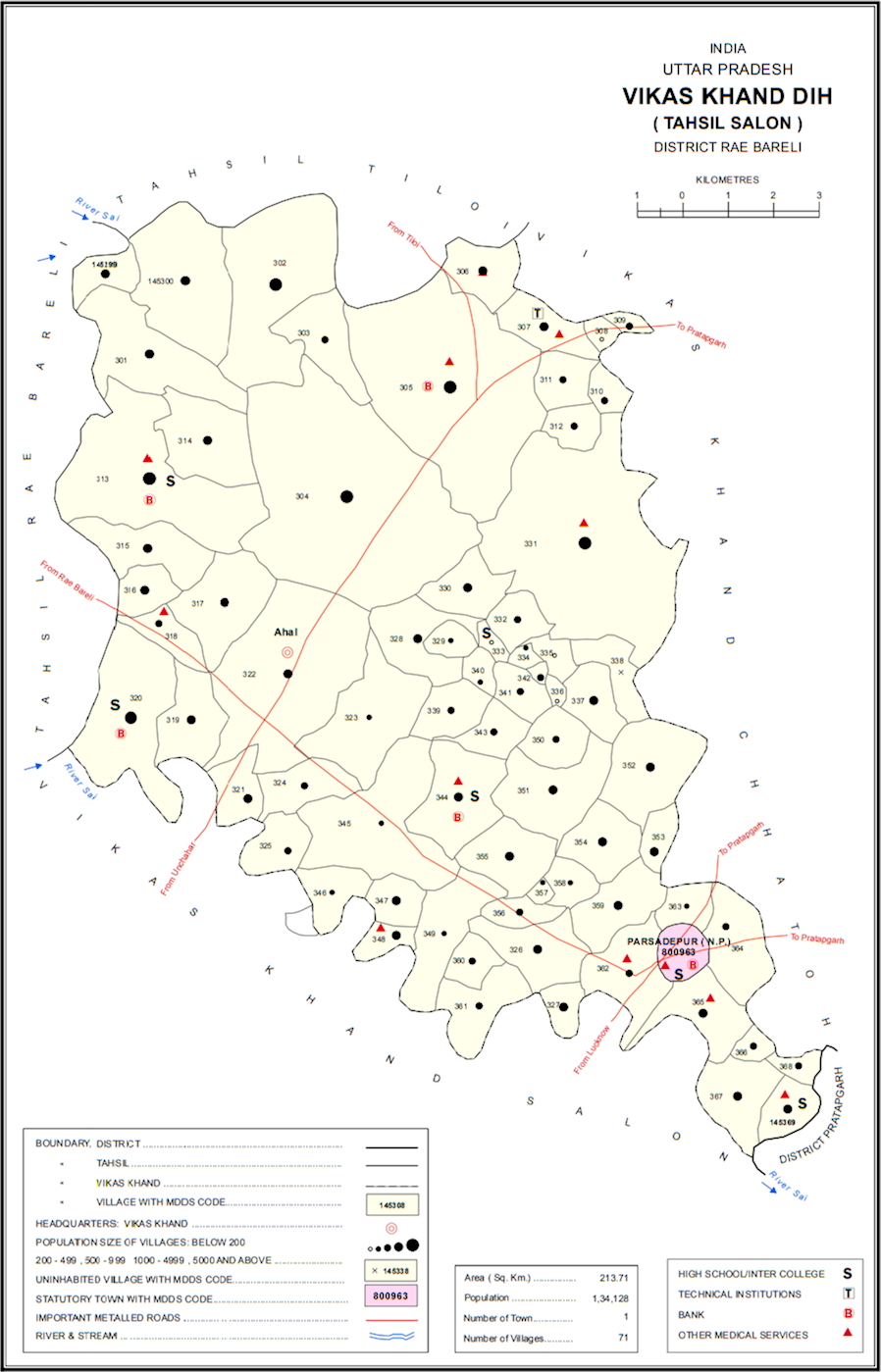
- Map showing Lodipur (#336) in Dih CD block

- Location in Uttar Pradesh, India
- Coordinates: 26.134542°N 81.471875°E
- Country: India
- State: Uttar Pradesh
- District: Raebareli

Area
  - Total: 0.135 km^{2} (0.052 sq mi)

Population (2011)
  - Total: 86
  - Density: 640/km^{2} (1,600/sq mi)

Languages
  - Official: Hindi
- Time zone: UTC+5:30 (IST)
- Vehicle registration: UP-35

Lodipur is a village in Dih block of Rae Bareli district, Uttar Pradesh, India. It is located 28 km from Raebareli, the district headquarters. As of 2011, it has a population of 86 people, in 20 households. It has no schools and no healthcare facilities, and it does not host a permanent market or a weekly haat. It belongs to the nyaya panchayat of Birnawan.

The 1951 census recorded Lodipur as comprising 1 hamlet, with a total population of 49 people (26 male and 23 female), in 12 households and 11 physical houses. The area of the village was given as 34 acres. 1 resident was literate, a male. The village was listed as belonging to the pargana of Rokha and the thana of Nasirabad.

The 1961 census recorded Lodipur as comprising one hamlet, with a total population of 64 people (31 male and 33 female), in 43 households and 32 physical houses. The area of the village was given as 34 acres.

The 1981 census recorded Lodipur (as "Lodipua") as having a population of 72 people, in 22 households, and having an area of 13.75 hectares. The main staple foods were listed as wheat and rice.

The 1991 census recorded Lodipur as having a total population of 92 people (44 male and 48 female), in 20 households and 20 physical houses. The area of the village was listed as 175 hectares. Members of the 0-6 age group numbered 18, or 20% of the total; this group was 44% male (8) and 56% female (10). Members of scheduled castes made up 47% of the village's population, while no members of scheduled tribes were recorded. The literacy rate of the village was 0% (0 men and 0 women). 31 people were classified as main workers (27 men and 4 women), while 0 people were classified as marginal workers; the remaining 61 residents were non-workers. The breakdown of main workers by employment category was as follows: 20 cultivators (i.e. people who owned or leased their own land); 11 agricultural labourers (i.e. people who worked someone else's land in return for payment); 0 workers in livestock, forestry, fishing, hunting, plantations, orchards, etc.; 0 in mining and quarrying; 0 household industry workers; 0 workers employed in other manufacturing, processing, service, and repair roles; 0 construction workers; 0 employed in trade and commerce; 0 employed in transport, storage, and communications; and 0 in other services.
