= Moen, Møre og Romsdal =

Village in Surnadal Municipality, Norway

Moen Mo
- Village
- Interactive map of Moen
- Location within Møre og Romsdal Location within Norway
- Coordinates: 62.8966°N 8.5635°E
- Country: Norway
- Region: Western Norway
- County: Møre og Romsdal
- District: Nordmøre
- Municipality: Surnadal Municipality
- Elevation: 50 m (160 ft)
- Time zone: UTC+01:00 (CET)
  - Summer (DST): UTC+02:00 (CEST)
- Post Code: 6640 Kvanne

Moen (or Mo) is a village in Surnadal Municipality in Møre og Romsdal county, Norway. The small farming village lies along the river Surna in the upper part of the Surnadalen valley, about 15 kilometres (9.3 mi) east of the municipal centre of Skei. The small village is home to Mo Church, the oldest church in the municipality. There is also a pre-school located in the village.
