= Moe Pond =

Small man-made lake in Otsego County, New York

- Location of Moe Pond within New York State
- Location: Otsego County, New York
- Coordinates: 42°43′04″N 74°56′42″W
- Primary outflows: Willow Brook
- Catchment area: 185.8 acres (75.2 ha)
- Max. length: 2,264 ft (690 m)
- Surface area: 39.5 acres (16.0 ha)
- Average depth: 5.97 ft (1.82 m)
- Max. depth: 12.47 ft (3.80 m)
- Water volume: 75,389,156 US gal (285,379.00 m^{3})
- Surface elevation: 1,627 feet (496 m)
- Settlements: Cooperstown

Moe Pond is a small man-made lake in Otsego County, New York, located north-west of Cooperstown. Moe Pond drains south via Willow Brook, which flows into Otsego Lake. Mount Ovis is located east and Hannah's Hill is located southeast of Moe Pond. The pond was named for Henry Allen Moe, a past member of the New York State Historical Association. Moe Pond was created in 1939. The pond and surrounding area is currently privately owned by the State University of New York at Oneonta (SUNY Oneonta), which uses it for educational and research purposes only.

== Fish populations ==
In 1995, a physical and chemical limnological summary as well as an ecological survey was conducted. It found a fish community consisting solely of brown bullhead and golden shiner. It was believed that the large population of shiners was responsible for the decline in larger zooplankton, which leads to a decrease in phytoplanktivory and lower Secchi readings as a result of greater algal blooms. The study suggested that addition of smallmouth bass and largemouth bass might reduce shiner populations through predation. However, after further assessment, a small population of smallmouth and largemouth bass were discovered in the pond in 1999. It was estimated the bass, of which were of an unknown origin, were stocked in the spring of 1999.
