= Mo language =

Mo may be:

- Deg language (Ghana)
- Wakde language (New Guinea)
