= Moe's =

Moe's or Moes may refer to:

- Moes (surname), includes a list of people with the name Moes
- Mões, civil parish in the municipality of Castro Daire, Portugal
- Moe's Southwest Grill, an American fast casual restaurant franchise
- Moe's Tavern, fictional bar in The Simpsons
- Moe's (bar and lounge), bar in Fort Greene, Brooklyn, New York City that closed in 2011

== See also ==
- Mo's Restaurants, American restaurant chain in Oregon
