= Juanita Moe =

American activist

Juanita Moe was a major proponent of bicycle trails in the early days of the city of Irvine, California. In the early 1970s Moe started an Ad Hoc bicycle trails committee to promote bicycle trails throughout the New City.

== Biking advocacy ==
In 1974, Moe was instrumental in promoting a bond issue which would include $2 million for bicycle trails, both on and off street. The City Council voted to ask Moe to coordinate citizen support for a June bond issue to fund bicycle trail development in Irvine. The Bike Bond passed overwhelmingly.

Moe served as the Secretary of the Bicycle Trails Committee, coordinating issues with the Transportation Commission, city council, and staff. Moe was also voted Chair of the Bike Committee where she served in that capacity for 14 years.

In 1975 City Councilman Henry Quigley (Republican) appointed Moe to the Irvine Transportation Commission. In July 1975, Moe had to defend the city's position on the need for a trail system funded by the developers. She was assisted by Director of Public Works Brent Muchow and Councilman John Burton who supported the notion that bike trails were a valuable community amenity. In March 1976 Mary Ann Gaido (Democrat) was elected to the Irvine City Council and re-appointed Moe to the Transportation Commission.

In May 1976 construction of the first of two bike underpasses at the ends of Turtle Rock Drive and the Riparian Corridor trail was completed as proposed.

In 1978 when her term as Transportation Commissioner expired, Moe continued to attend meetings of the Transportation Commission, the Planning Commission, and City Council on behalf of the committee. The City Council asked Moe to attend the National Bike Planning conferences at Palo Alto, California, University of California, Davis, and San Diego that helped Irvine develop the best planning criteria for the city's Master Plan of Trails.

By 1985 Irvine could boast of 186 miles of on and off-street bike paths and lanes often punctuated with grade separated crossings. Shared with joggers and pedestrians, one of the most extensive bicycle path systems in California was created by the city of Irvine.

On May 1, 1987 KNBC-TV's Fritz Coleman presented Moe with the Spirit of Southern California's Volunteer award for her efforts at developing the Irvine Bike Trail system.

On July 28, 2015, the city of Irvine named the Juanita Moe Trail in honor of Ms. Moe's dedication and vision for the entire Irvine Bike Trail System. The trail named in her honor was formerly known as Quail Hill Trail (bordering the 405 Freeway on the south between Shady Canyon and University Drive).

In January, 2012, Juanita Moe moved to Rancho Santa Fe, California with her husband where she taught piano. She died on January 26, 2025, at the age of 83.
