= Moes (surname) =

Moes is a surname. Notable people with the name include:

- André Moes (1930–2019), Luxembourgish Olympic cyclist
- Ernst Wilhelm Moes (1864 – 1912), Dutch art historian
- Freeke Moes (born 1998), Dutch field hockey player
- Gerlacus Moes (1902–1965), Dutch swimmer
- Gouke Moes (born 1991), Dutch politician
- Jeannot Moes (born 1948), Luxembourgish footballer
- Jerzy Moes (1935–2019), Polish actor
- Linda Moes (born 1971), Dutch Olympic swimmer
- Mary Alfred Moes (1828–1899), American Roman Catholic nun
- Wally Moes (1856–1918), Dutch painter
- Władysław Moes (1900–1986), Polish nobleman

== See also ==
- Moe (surname)
