= MHO =

MHO or mho may refer to:

- Mho, a former name for the siemens (unit)
- Metabolically healthy obesity (MHO)
- Mashi language (ISO 639-3 language code mho)
