= Sturgeon Falls =

Community in West Nipissing, Ontario, Canada

- Unincorporated community
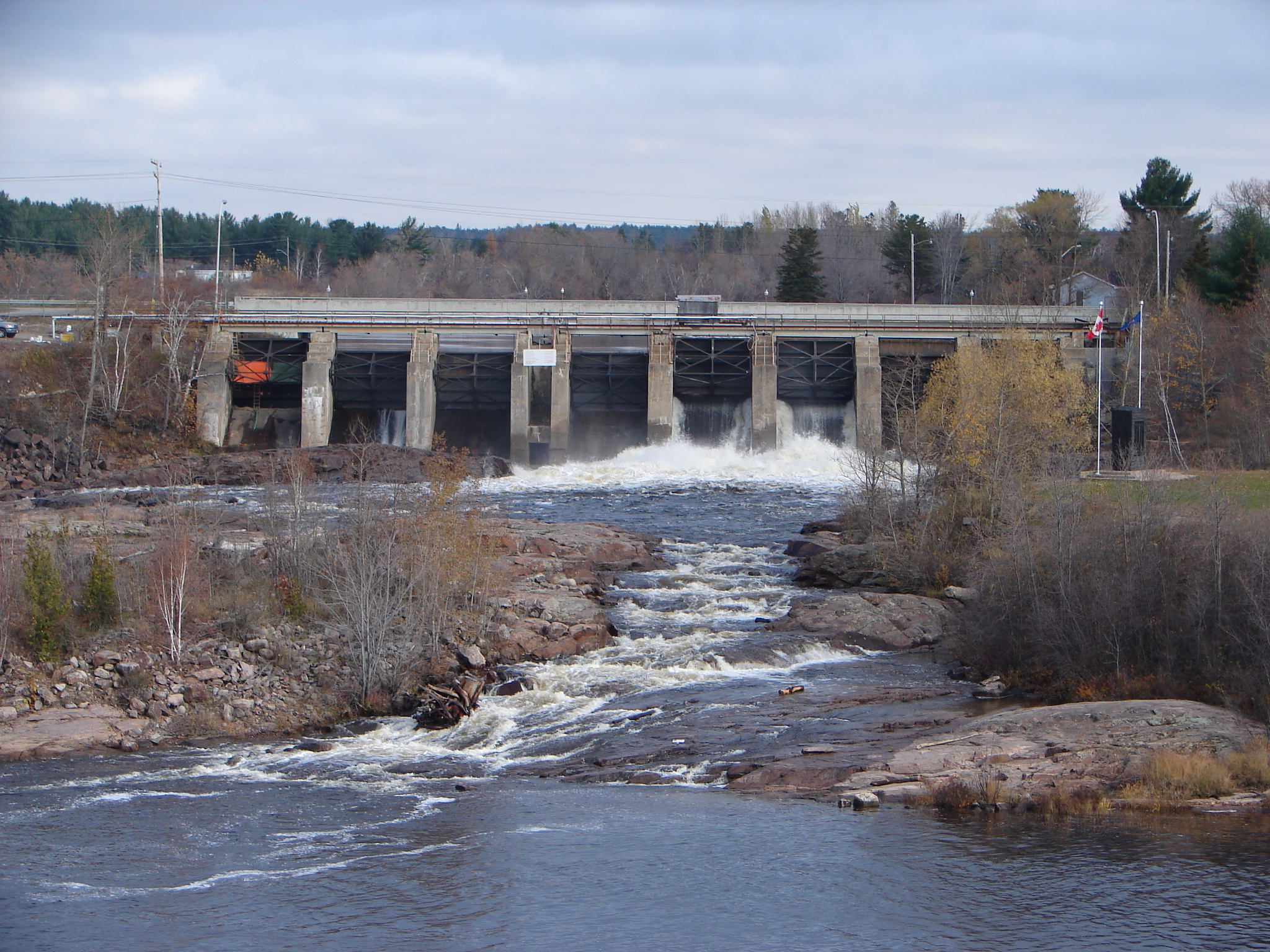
- The namesake Sturgeon Falls on the Sturgeon River

- Location within Ontario
- Coordinates: 46°21′N 79°55′W
- Country: Canada
- Province: Ontario
- District: Nipissing
- Municipality: West Nipissing
- Settled: 1880s
- Incorporated: 1895
- Dissolved (amalgamated): January 1, 1999

Government
  - Fed. riding: Sudbury East—Manitoulin—Nickel Belt
  - Prov. riding: Timiskaming—Cochrane

Area
  - Land: 6.15 km^{2} (2.37 sq mi)

Population (2021)
  - Total: 6,939
  - Density: 1,128.7/km^{2} (2,923/sq mi)
- Time zone: UTC-5 (EST)
  - Summer (DST): UTC-4 (EDT)
- Postal code FSA: P2B
- Area codes: 705, 249, 683

Sturgeon Falls is a community and former town in Nipissing District, Ontario, Canada, located on the Sturgeon River. Following a failed legal challenge in 1997, the community was merged into the municipality of West Nipissing in 1999.

== History ==
Ojibwe and Algonquin tribes first settled in the Sturgeon Falls area thousands of years ago. Discovered by European fur traders in the 17th century, the development of Sturgeon Falls began with the construction of the Canadian Pacific Railway in 1881. French Canadians immigrated to the community from Simcoe and Muskoka following the establishment of lumber and pulp and paper industries. Sturgeon Falls was officially incorporated as a town in 1895, with a population of 850.

On January 1, 1999, the Towns of Sturgeon Falls and Cache Bay, the Townships of Caldwell and Field, along with the unorganized geographic township of Springer, were amalgamated in to the new Municipality of West Nipissing.

== Demographics ==
At the 2021 census, the community had a population of 6,939 with a density of 1,128.7 per square kilometre (2,923/sq mi). The population increases by approximately 0.070% annually.

In 2016, the community consisted of 53.8% women and 46.3% men. The vast majority of residents were born in Canada, with immigrants making up only 2.5% of the population. 61.8% reported French as their first language, and 34.2% reported English. The people of Sturgeon Falls have advocated for French-speaking rights since its beginning. In 1930, 75-80% of residents were French speaking after the closure of the Abitbi Power and Paper plant caused an exodus of many English speakers.

Historical census populations – Sturgeon Falls
(town 1895–1998, population centre 1999–...)

Year	Pop.	±%
1901	1,418	—
1911	2,199	+55.1%
1921	4,125	+87.6%
1931	4,234	+2.6%
1941	4,576	+8.1%
1951	4,962	+8.4%
1956	5,874	+18.4%

Year	Pop.	±%
1961	6,288	+7.0%
1966	6,430	+2.3%
1971	6,662	+3.6%
1976	6,400	−3.9%
1981	6,045	−5.5%
1986	5,895	−2.5%
1991	5,837	−1.0%

Year	Pop.	±%
1996	6,162	+5.6%
2001	5,978	−3.0%
2006	6,353	+6.3%
2011	6,672	+5.0%
2016	6,798	+1.9%
2021	6,939	+2.1%

Population counts are not adjusted for boundary changes.
Source: Statistics Canada

Mother tongue (2021):

- English as first language: 37.9 %
- French as first language: 55.9 %
- English and French as first languages: 4.6 %
- Other as first language: 1.3 %

== Notable people born in Sturgeon Falls ==
- Jean-Jacques Blais, cabinet member in the Canadian government
- Leo Bourgeault, ice hockey player
- Louise Charron, first Franco-Ontarian justice of the Supreme Court of Canada
- Carl Legault, federal politician
- Moe Mantha, Sr., ice hockey player
- Roch Martin, Roman Catholic bishop
- Shep Mayer, ice hockey player
- Denise Meehan, founder and operator of the Lick's hamburger chain
- André Paiement, singer and songwriter
- Rachel Paiement, singer and songwriter
- Gaetan Serré, federal politician
