= Tor-Arne Moen =

Norwegian painter and author (born 1966)

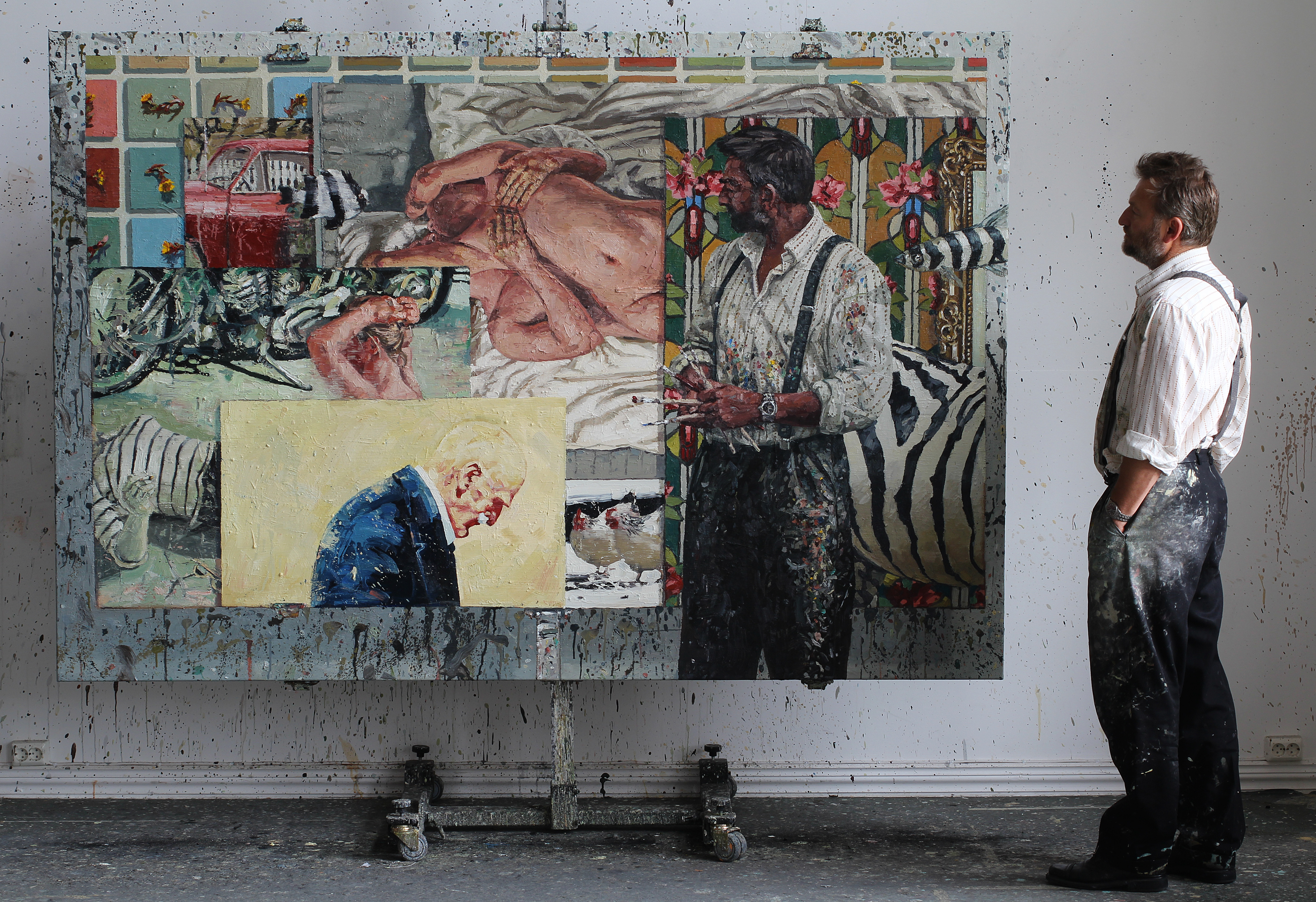
- Tor-Arne Moen in front of his painting "Natural selection"
- Born: 13 May 1966
- Known for: Painting and writing
- Website: torarnemoen.com

Tor-Arne Moen (born 13 May 1966) is a Norwegian painter and author. He lives in Notodden and has atelier in Hydroparken. He's a member of the Norske Billedkunstnere (the Norwegian Authors' Union) and the Norske Grafikere.

Moen debuted at Høstutstillingen in 1994. He made the front covers for a re-release of Knut Hamsun's complete works from 1992 to 1994. These paintings are displayed at the Tranøy gallery in Hamarøy Municipality.

In 1998 he released a collection of short stories, called Høst i sommerfuglhagen (Autumn in the garden of butterflies), and in 2008 he authored the novel Brønnørreten.

== Bibliography ==
- 1998: Høst i sommerfuglhagen
- 2008: Brønnørreten

== Gallery ==
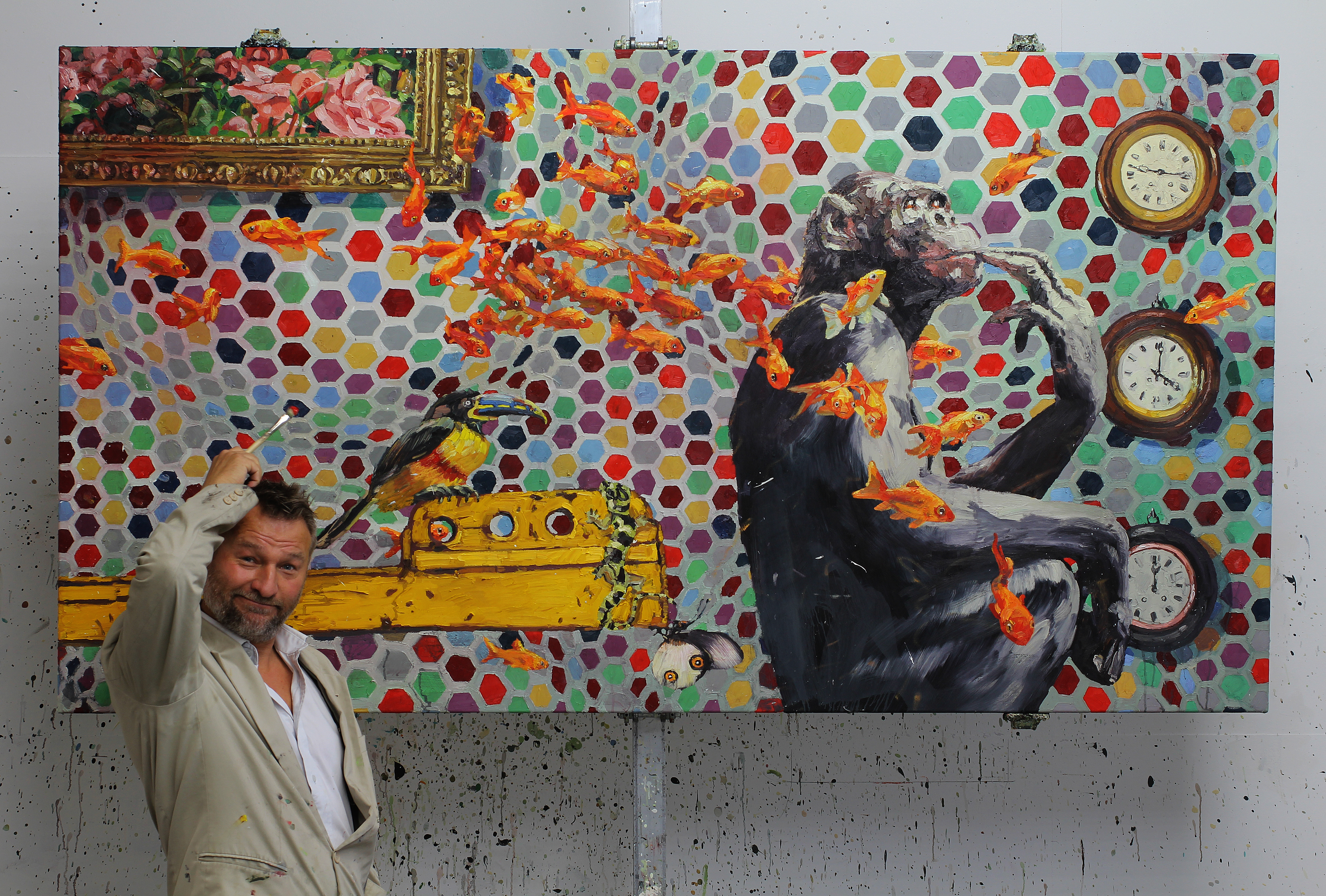
"African time"

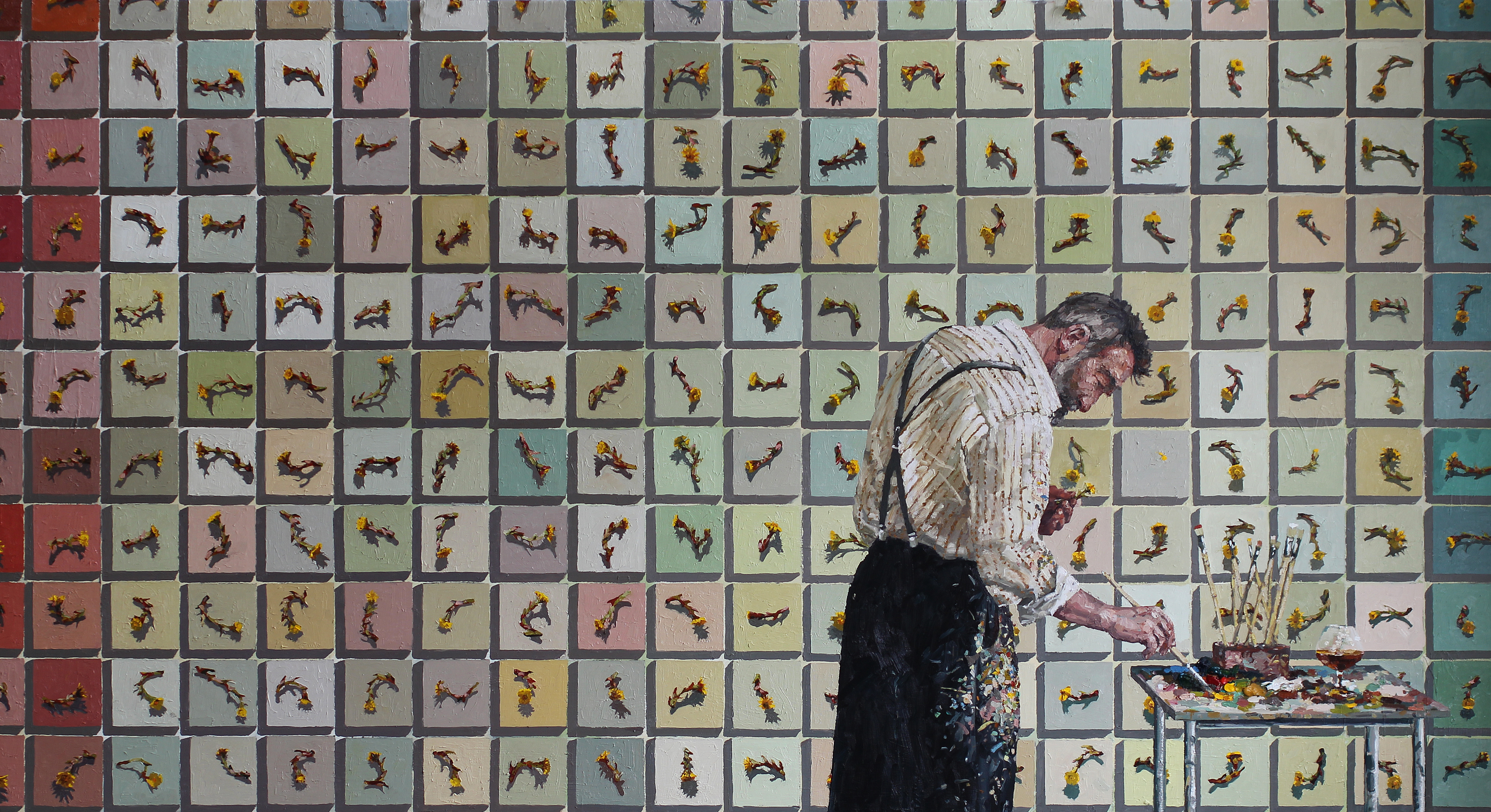
"Spring is here, I hear"
