= Trygve Moe (politician) =

Norwegian politician

Trygve Moe (21 March 1920 – 13 September 1998) was a Norwegian politician for the Liberal Party and the Liberal People's Party.

He served as a deputy representative to the Parliament of Norway from Vestfold during the term 1965–1969. In 1973 she stood for election for the Liberal People's Party.

He was a banker in Sandefjord.
