= Mow, Gaya =

Village in Gaya district, Bihar, India

Mau Mow
- Location within Bihar
- Coordinates: 25.00136°N 84.81042°E
- Country: India
- State: Bihar
- District: Gaya district
- Subdivision: Tikari

Area
  - Total: 428 ha (1,060 acres)

Population (2011)
  - Total: 7,496
  - Density: 1,750/km^{2} (4,540/sq mi)

Languages
  - Official: Hindi
- PIN: 824235

Mau, also spelled Mow, is a village in the Tikari subdivision of Gaya district, Bihar, India.

The village is identified by census code 254686 in the 2011 Census of India.

== Demographics ==
According to the 2011 Census of India, Mau had a population of 7.496 people living in 1.134 households. The population included 3,929 males and 3.567 females. Children aged 0–6 numbered 1.393.

The village's overall literacy rate was 69.67% Male literacy was 80.82% while female literacy was 57.16%. Scheduled Castes accounted for 1,651 residents, or approximately 22.03% of the population.
