= Moe Mantha Jr. =

American ice hockey player

- Born: January 21, 1961 (age 65) Lakewood, Ohio, U.S.
- Height: 6 ft 2 in (188 cm)
- Weight: 210 lb (95 kg; 15 st 0 lb)
- Position: Defense
- Shot: Right
- Played for: Winnipeg Jets; Pittsburgh Penguins; Edmonton Oilers; Minnesota North Stars; Philadelphia Flyers
- National team: United States
- NHL draft: 23rd overall, 1980; Winnipeg Jets
- Playing career: 1980–1993

Maurice William Mantha Jr. (born January 21, 1961) is an American former professional ice hockey defenseman and who played twelve seasons in the National Hockey League (NHL) with the Winnipeg Jets, Pittsburgh Penguins, Edmonton Oilers, Minnesota North Stars, and Philadelphia Flyers.

== Playing and coaching career ==
Mantha was born while his father, Moe Mantha Sr., was playing for the Cleveland Barons of the American Hockey League (AHL). He was subsequently raised in Canada, when his father retired from hockey and returned to his hometown of Sturgeon Falls, Ontario. Moe Mantha Jr. has represented the United States in international hockey; he was a member of the U.S. team in the 1981, 1985, and 1991 Ice Hockey World Championships as well as the 1992 Winter Olympics.

Mantha first played for the Toronto Marlboros of the Ontario Hockey Association in 1978, and was drafted by the NHL's Winnipeg Jets in 1980. He played for the Jets and their minor league farm teams until 1984, when he was traded to the Pittsburgh Penguins. He was then sent to the Edmonton Oilers in 1988; the Oilers traded him to the Minnesota North Stars later that same season. He later played for the Philadelphia Flyers and another stint with the Jets.

1992–93 was Mantha's final season as a player, for the AHL's Hershey Bears; he has since coached teams in the AHL (Hershey and the Cincinnati Mighty Ducks) and the ECHL's Columbus Chill. He coached the junior USA team out of Ann Arbor, Michigan, from 2000 to 2004. In 2005, Mantha was named as the head coach of the Detroit Gladiators of the new World Hockey Association, but the league never made it to the ice; instead, he served as head coach and general manager of the Windsor Spitfires of the Ontario Hockey League (OHL) until he was terminated for gross misconduct during the Akim Aliu/Steve Downie hazing scandal that ultimately resulted in the Spitfires being fined $35,000 under Mantha's tenure. Mantha then served as the general manager and head coach for the French River Rapids of the NOJHL. On February 16, 2016, he was named interim head coach of the Saginaw Spirit of the OHL, making his second trip behind the Spirit bench, replacing the recently fired Greg Gilbert. He was not retained at the end of that season. In 2017, he was hired as the head coach and general manager of the Brookings Blizzard in the North American Hockey League. The Blizzard retained Mantha for one season after it relocated as the St. Cloud Blizzard in 2019 before he retired in 2020.

== Personal life ==
Mantha's nephew, Ryan Mantha, was drafted by the New York Rangers in the fourth round of the 2014 NHL entry draft, and was a prospect in the Edmonton Oilers organization before being sidelined by an eye injury and a heart defect.

== Career statistics ==
=== Regular season and playoffs ===
			Regular season					Playoffs
Season	Team	League	GP	G	A	Pts	PIM	GP	G	A	Pts	PIM
1976–77	Streetsville Derbys	CJHL	63	35	70	105	75	—	—	—	—	—
1978–79	Toronto Marlboros	OMJHL	68	10	38	48	45	3	0	0	0	0
1979–80	Toronto Marlboros	OMJHL	58	8	38	46	86	4	0	2	2	11
1980–81	Winnipeg Jets	NHL	58	2	23	25	35	—	—	—	—	—
1981–82	Winnipeg Jets	NHL	25	0	12	12	28	4	1	3	4	16
1981–82	Tulsa Oilers	CHL	33	8	15	23	56	—	—	—	—	—
1982–83	Winnipeg Jets	NHL	21	2	7	9	6	2	2	2	4	0
1982–83	Sherbrooke Jets	AHL	13	1	4	5	13	—	—	—	—	—
1983–84	Winnipeg Jets	NHL	72	16	38	54	67	3	1	0	1	0
1983–84	Sherbrooke Jets	AHL	7	1	1	2	10	—	—	—	—	—
1984–85	Pittsburgh Penguins	NHL	71	11	40	51	54	—	—	—	—	—
1985–86	Pittsburgh Penguins	NHL	78	15	52	67	102	—	—	—	—	—
1986–87	Pittsburgh Penguins	NHL	62	9	31	40	44	—	—	—	—	—
1987–88	Pittsburgh Penguins	NHL	21	2	8	10	23	—	—	—	—	—
1987–88	Edmonton Oilers	NHL	25	0	6	6	26	—	—	—	—	—
1987–88	Minnesota North Stars	NHL	30	9	13	22	4	—	—	—	—	—
1988–89	Minnesota North Stars	NHL	16	1	6	7	10	—	—	—	—	—
1988–89	Philadelphia Flyers	NHL	30	3	8	11	33	1	0	0	0	0
1989–90	Winnipeg Jets	NHL	73	2	26	28	28	7	1	5	6	2
1990–91	Winnipeg Jets	NHL	57	9	15	24	33	—	—	—	—	—
1991–92	Winnipeg Jets	NHL	12	0	4	4	6	—	—	—	—	—
1991–92	Philadelphia Flyers	NHL	5	0	0	0	2	—	—	—	—	—
1992–93	Hershey Bears	AHL	1	0	0	0	0	—	—	—	—	—
NHL totals			656	81	289	370	501	17	5	10	15	18

=== International ===
Year	Team	Event	GP	G	A	Pts	PIM
1982	United States	WC	7	1	1	2	6
1985	United States	WC	10	2	1	3	10
1991	United States	WC	9	0	0	0	2
1992	United States	OG	8	1	1	2	4
Senior totals			34	4	3	7	22

== Coaching statistics ==
Year	Team (League)	Regular season							Postseason			
Year	Team (League)	G	W	L	T	OTL	Pts	Finish	G	W	L	Result
1994–95	Columbus Chill (ECHL)	68	31	32	0	5	67	4th East Division	3	0	3	Lost in round 1
1995–96	Columbus Chill (ECHL)	70	37	28	0	5	79	4th North Division	3	0	3	Lost in round 1
1996–97	Baltimore Bandits (AHL)	80	30	37	10	3	73	4th Mid-Atlantic Division	3	0	3	Lost in round 1
1997–98	Cincinnati Mighty Ducks (AHL)	80	23	37	13	7	66	4th Mid-Atlantic Division	Did not qualify			
1998–99	Cincinnati Mighty Ducks (AHL)	80	35	39	4	2	76	4th Mid-Atlantic Division	3	0	3	Lost in round 1
1999–00	Cincinnati Mighty Ducks (AHL)	80	30	37	9	4	73	5th Mid-Atlantic Division	Did not qualify			
2000–01	USNTDP Under-18 Team (NAHL)	56	18	35	0	3	39	5th East Division	Did not qualify			
2005–06	Windsor Spitfires (OHL)	68	32	29	0	7	71	3rd West Division	7	3	4	Lost in round 1
2010–11	Michigan Warriors (NAHL)	58	35	17	0	6	76	3rd North Division	11	7	4	Lost in Final
2011–12	Michigan Warriors (NAHL)	60	23	32	0	5	51	4th North Division	4	1	3	Lost in round 1
2012–13	Michigan Warriors (NAHL)	60	19	32	0	9	47	8th North Division	Did not qualify			
2013–14	Michigan Warriors (NAHL)	60	30	20	0	10	70	2nd North Division	9	6	3	Lost in round 3
