= Meaux (disambiguation) =

Meaux may refer to:

- Meaux, a town in the Seine-et-Marne department, France
  - Arrondissement of Meaux
  - Canton of Meaux-Nord
  - Canton of Meaux-Sud
  - CS Meaux, football club
  - CS Meaux (WBC), a wheelchair basketball club
- Meaux-la-Montagne, a commune in the Rhône department, France
- Meaux Abbey and Meaux, East Riding of Yorkshire, a hamlet in the East Riding of Yorkshire, England
- Meaux, Louisiana, an unincorporated area in Vermilion Parish, Louisiana, USA

== People ==
- Amy Dafler Meaux, American priest
- Huey P. Meaux, American record producer
- Meaux, the French surname was the origin of surname Moe** or Mow given to some of the immigrants to the United States from France in the 1600s. It was not uncommon for spellings to be simplified phonetically when immigrating to the United States. (**Of different ancestry than Moe or Moen surnames of Norwegian ancestry and origin.)
