= Mohs =

Mohs or MoHS can refer to:

- Friedrich Mohs, a 19th-century German geologist who developed:
  - Mohs scale, a scale used in materials science to describe hardness
- Frederic E. Mohs, an American doctor who developed:
  - Mohs surgery, a microscopically controlled surgery highly effective for common types of skin cancer
- Erik Mohs, a German professional racing cyclist
- Mohs Automobile, an automobile built by the American Mohs Seaplane Corporation
- Moanalua High School, a public, co-educational college preparatory high school in Hawaiʻi
- The Melancholy of Haruhi Suzumiya, a 2006 anime sci-fi television series
- Mount Olive High School, a U.S. public high school in Flanders, New Jersey
- Ministry of Health and Sports (Myanmar), a ministry of the government of Myanmar

== See also ==
- Mho, an alternative name for the Siemens (unit)
