= Moe Mantha Sr. =

Canadian ice hockey player and politician

- Born: December 13, 1933 North Bay, Ontario, Canada
- Died: September 18, 2015 (aged 81) Sturgeon Falls, Ontario, Canada
- Height: 6 ft 1 in (185 cm)
- Weight: 185 lb (84 kg; 13 st 3 lb)
- Position: Defence
- Shot: Right
- Played for: Cincinnati Mohawks; Ottawa Jr. Canadiens; Montreal Royals; Cleveland Barons; Quebec Aces; San Francisco Seals; Seattle Totems; Vancouver Canucks; California Seals; Providence Reds; Columbus Checkers
- Playing career: 1954–1970

Member of Parliament for Nipissing
- In office September 4, 1984 – November 20, 1988
- Preceded by: Jean-Jacques Blais
- Succeeded by: Bob Wood

Personal details
- Party: Progressive Conservative

Maurice William Mantha (December 13, 1933 – September 18, 2015) was a Canadian ice hockey player and a politician.

Born in North Bay, Ontario, Mantha played minor league hockey for several teams in the American Hockey League, the Quebec Hockey League and the Western Hockey League from 1954 to 1970. He subsequently returned to Sturgeon Falls and operated his own business (Laurentide Golf Club) for a number of years before entering politics, serving as the Reeve of Springer Township.

In the 1984 federal election, Mantha ran as the Progressive Conservative candidate in Nipissing. He won the seat, defeating Liberal incumbent Jean-Jacques Blais. In the 1988 election, however, Mantha was defeated by Liberal candidate Bob Wood. Mantha ran again in the 1993 election, but lost to Wood again.

Mantha's son, Moe Mantha Jr., played in the National Hockey League from 1980 to 1992, and subsequently became a coach for several teams in the AHL. His grandson, Ryan Mantha, was drafted by the New York Rangers in the fourth round of the 2014 NHL entry draft, and was assigned to the Bakersfield Condors of the AHL.

Mantha died on September 18, 2015, at the age of 81 after a brief illness.
