= Dashrath Manjhi =

Indian laborer (1934–2007)

- दशरथ मांझी
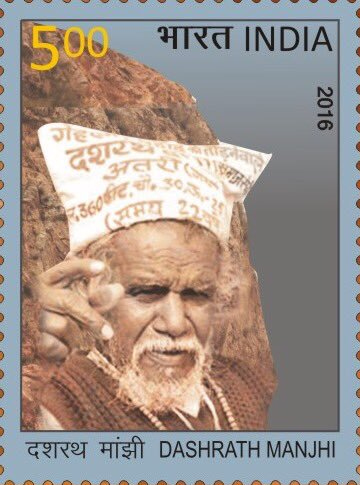
- Dashrath Manjhi on 2016 stamp of India
- Born: 14 January 1934; Gehlaur, Bihar and Orissa Province, British India
- Died: 17 August 2007 (aged 73); New Delhi, India
- Other name: Mountain Man
- Known for: Manually carving a mountain in order to connect Gehlaur and Gaya
- Spouse: Falguni Devi

Dashrath Manjhi (14 January 1934 – 17 August 2007), also known as the Mountain Man, was an Indian laborer from Gehlaur village, near Gaya in the eastern state of Bihar. He is best known for carving a 110-metre-long (360 ft), 9.1-metre-wide (30 ft), and 7.7-metre-deep (25 ft) path through a ridge of hills using only a hammer and a chisel, because his wife had fallen and died from injuries due to the ridge blocking easy access to a nearby hospital on time. After 22 years of work, Dashrath shortened travel between the Atri and Wazirganj blocks of Gaya district from 55 km (34 mi) to 15 km (9.3 mi). He travelled to New Delhi to get recognition of his work and was rewarded by then Chief Minister of Bihar, Nitish Kumar. In 2016, India Post issued a postage stamp featuring Manjhi.

== Early life ==
Manjhi was born in Gehlaur on 14 January 1934. He ran away from his home at a young age and worked in coal mines at Dhanbad, later returning to Gehlaur and married Falguni (or Phaguni) Devi.

Gehlaur was and currently is economically backward, and although it lies in a plain, it is bordered on the south by a steeply ascending quartzite ridge of Mesoproterozoic (1–1.6 billion years) age (part of the Rajgir Hills) which formerly prevented road access from the town of Wazirganj.

== Accident and road building ==
After he returned to Gehlaur, Manjhi became an agricultural labourer. In 1959, Manjhi's wife Falguni Devi was badly injured and died because she fell from the mountain and the nearest town with a doctor was 70 kilometres (43 mi) away. Some reports say she was injured while walking along a narrow path across the rocky ridge to bring water or lunch to Manjhi, who had to work away from the village at a location south of the ridge; other reports link the path across the ridge to the delayed care but not to Falguni Devi's injuries.

As a result of this experience Manjhi resolved to cut a roadway across the ridge to make his village more accessible. Manjhi felt that the loss of his beloved wife could have been prevented, also he wished to spare the next person of having to experience a similar fate, so he felt determined to carve a path through the ridge, so that his village could one day have easier access to medical care.

He carved a path 110 metres (360 ft) long, 7.7 metres (25 ft) deep in places and 9.1 metres (30 ft) wide to form a road through the ridge of rocks. The latitude and longitude are approximately 24.877°N 85.243°E.

He said, "When I started hammering the hill, people called me a lunatic, but that steeled my resolve."

He completed the work in 22 years (1960–1982). This path reduced the distance between the Atri and Wazirganj sectors of Gaya district from 55 to 15 kilometres (34.2 to 9.3 mi). Though he was mocked for his efforts, Manjhi's work has made life easier for people of the Gehlaur village. Manjhi recalled later that "though most villagers taunted me at first, there were quite a few who lent me support later by giving me food and helping me buy my tools."

Official roads between his village in Atri and Wazirganj, over the path he carved, were built after his death in 2007.

== Death ==
Manjhi was diagnosed with gallbladder cancer and was admitted to AIIMS New Delhi on 23 July 2007. He died there on 17 August 2007. He was given a state funeral by the Government of Bihar.

For his feat, Manjhi became popularly known as the 'Mountain Man'. The Bihar government also proposed his name for the Padma Shri award in 2006 in the social service sector.

A stamp featuring Dashrath Manjhi was released by India Post in the "Personalities of Bihar" series on 26 December 2016.

== In popular culture ==
Dashrath Manjhi's story has been the subject of at least one documentary and several dramatic treatments in Indian film and television.

The first of these was a supporting character based on Manjhi in the 1998 Kannada-language movie Bhoomi Thayiya Chochchala Maga. Manjhi's story also had a minor role in a later Kannada film, 2011's Olave Mandara, directed by Jayatheertha.

In 2011, director Kumud Ranjan, working for the state-owned Films Division of India, produced a documentary based on Manjhi's life titled The Man Who Moved the Mountain.

In August 2015, a Hindi movie Manjhi – The Mountain Man was released and well received. The movie was directed by Ketan Mehta. Nawazuddin Siddiqui played the role of Manjhi along with Radhika Apte as Falguni Devi.

The first episode of Season 2 of the Aamir Khan hosted TV Show Satyamev Jayate, aired in March 2014, was dedicated to Dashrath Manjhi. Aamir Khan and Rajesh Ranjan also met Bhagirath Manjhi and Basanti Devi, son and daughter-in-law of Manjhi, respectively, and promised to provide financial help. However, Basanti Devi died due to her inability to afford medical care on 1 April 2014.

== Gallery ==
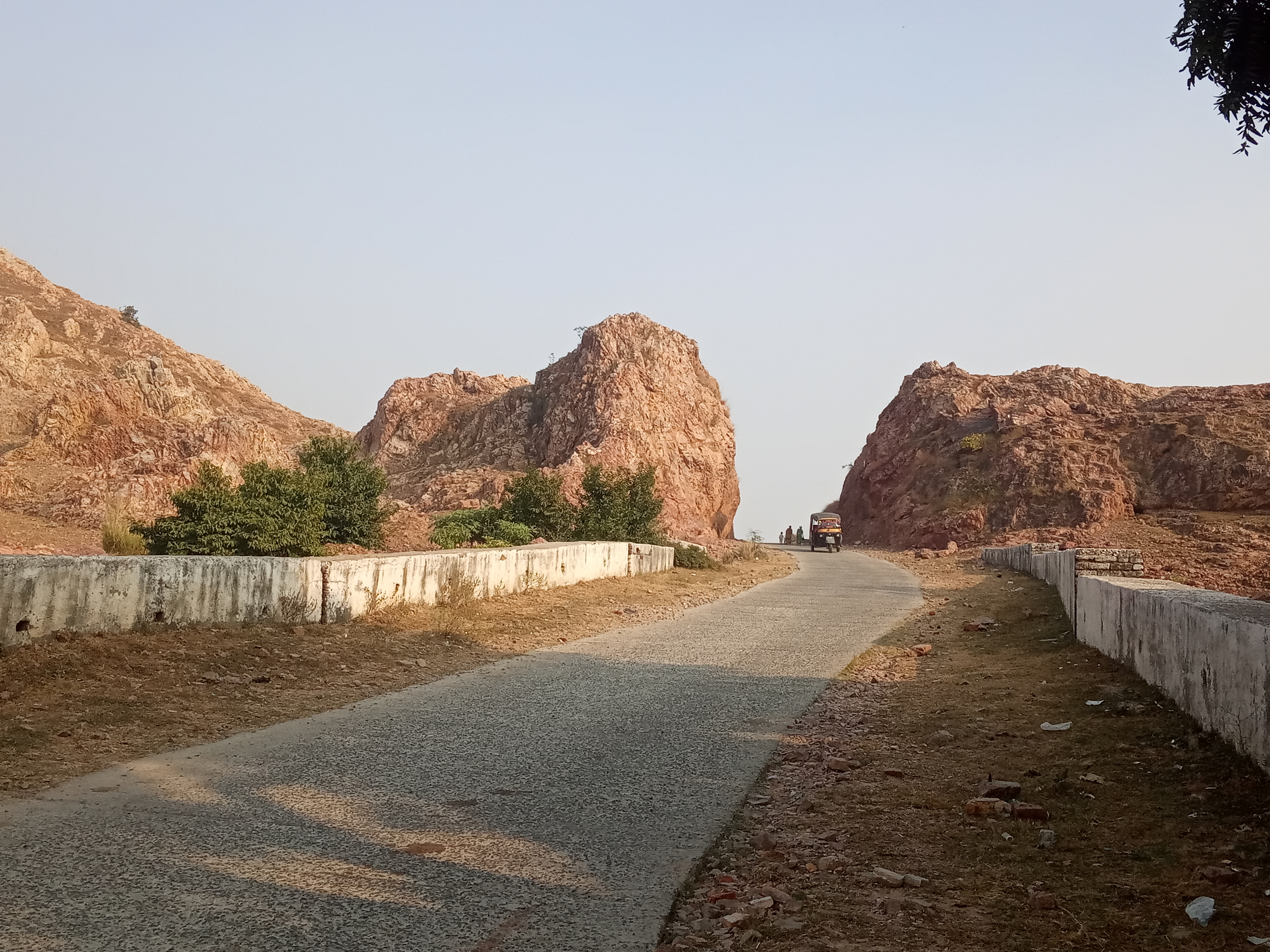
Link between Ghivra Mauja in Gehlaur Ghati to Atara Prakhand Wazirganj made by Dashrath Manjhi

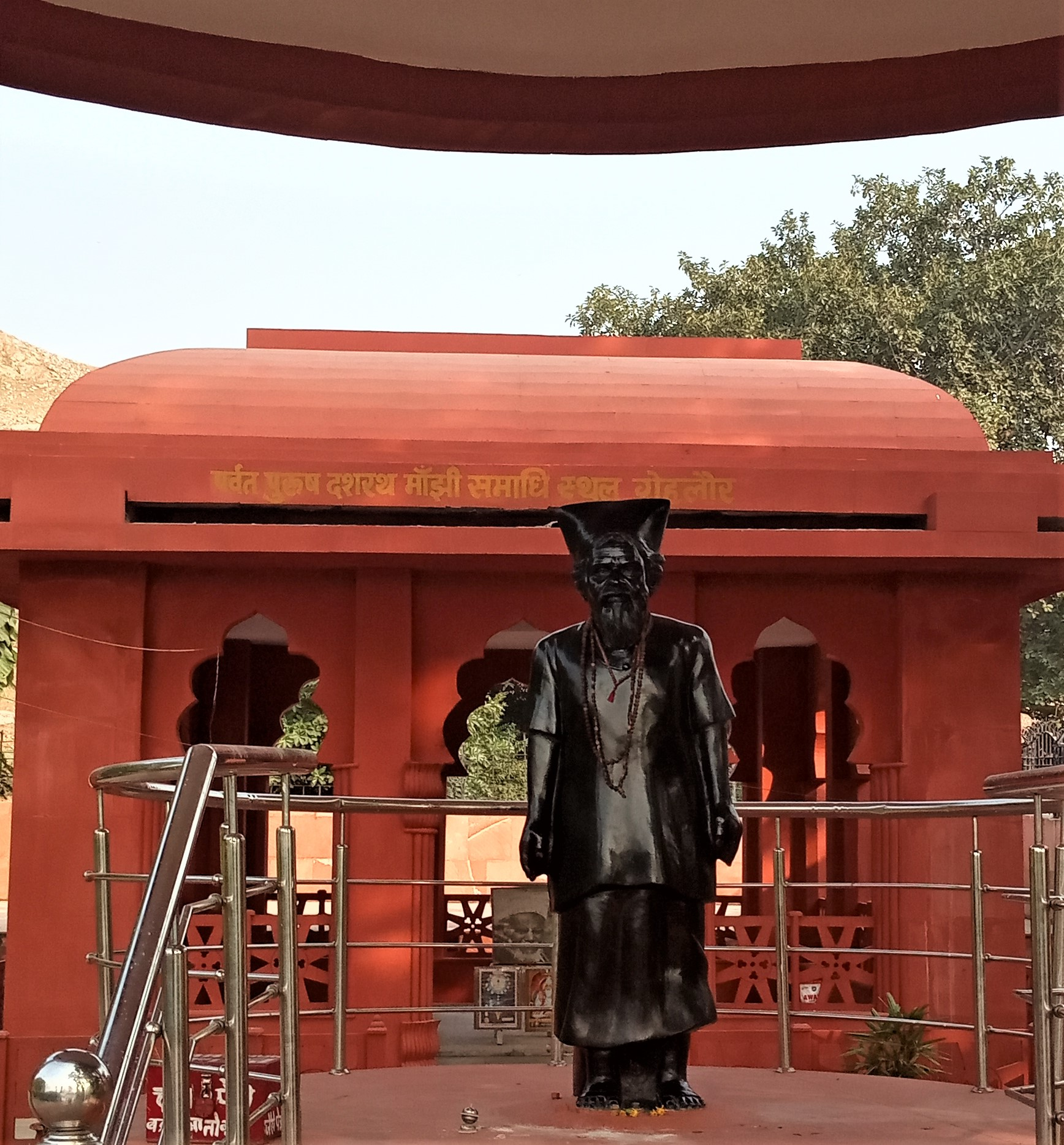
Statue of Dashrath Manjhi in front of his memorial at Gehlaur

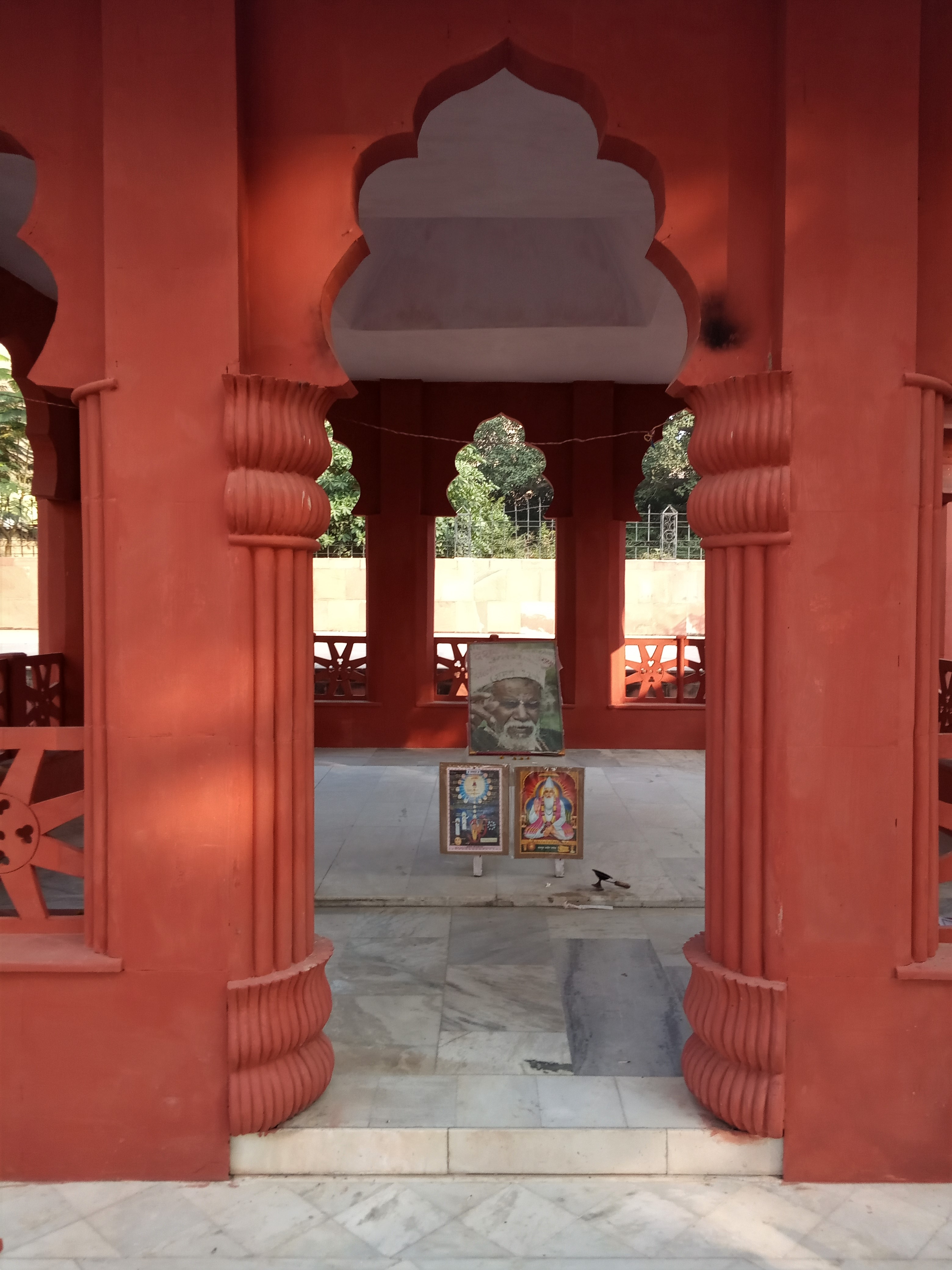
Memorial of Dashrath Manjhi

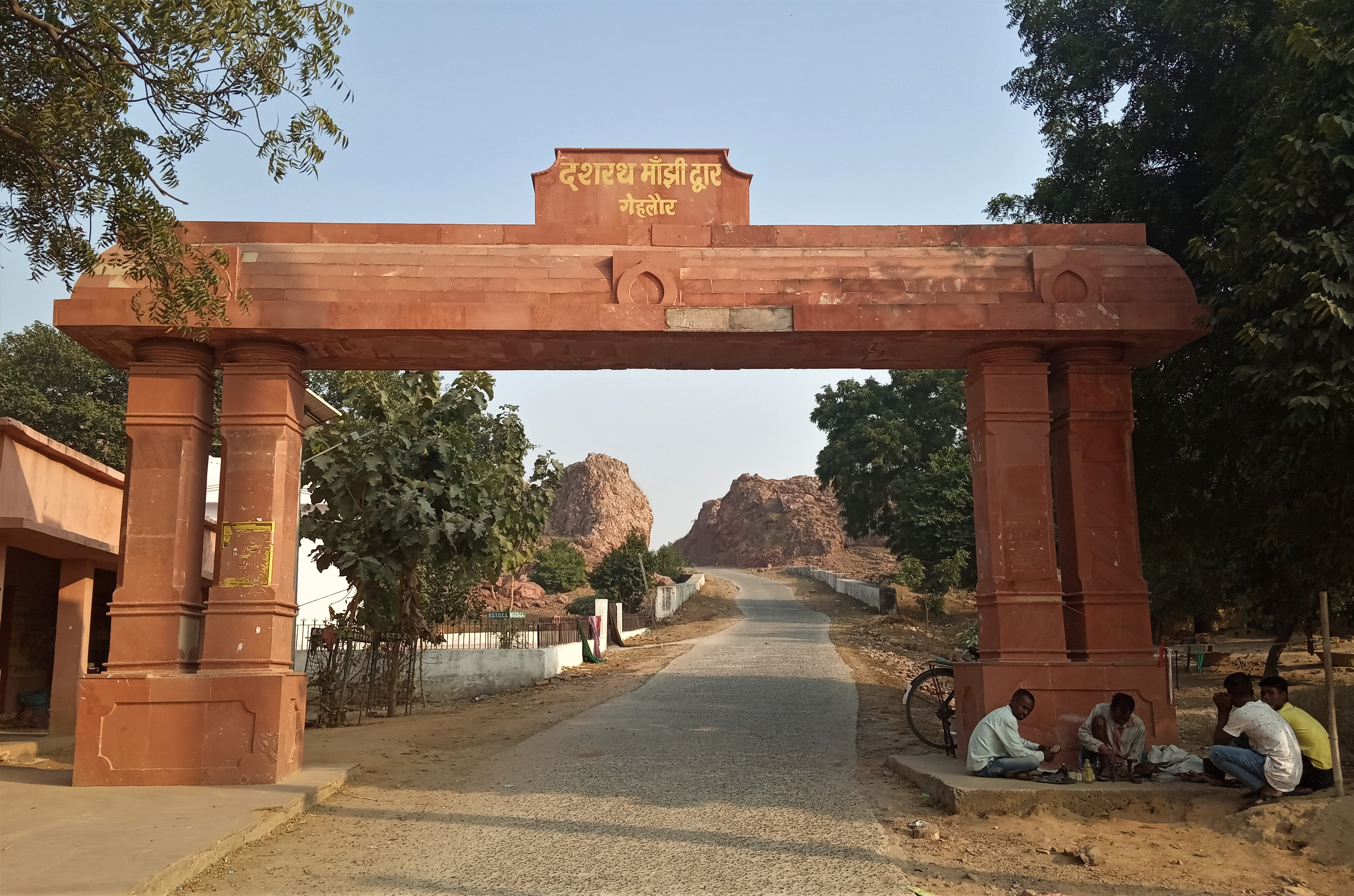
Dashrath Manjhi entry gate towards Gehlaur Ghati

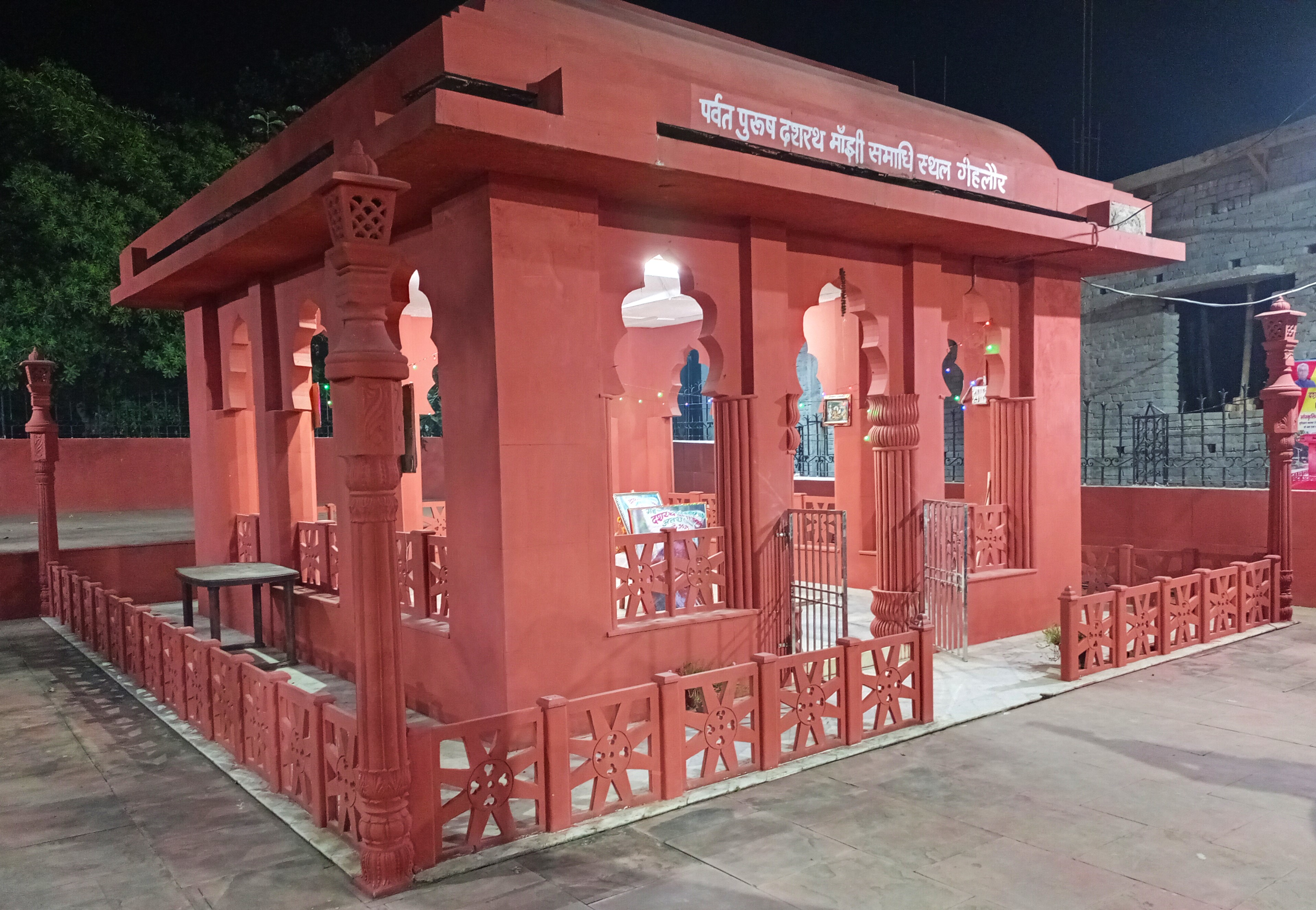
Samadhi sthal of Dashrath Manjhi

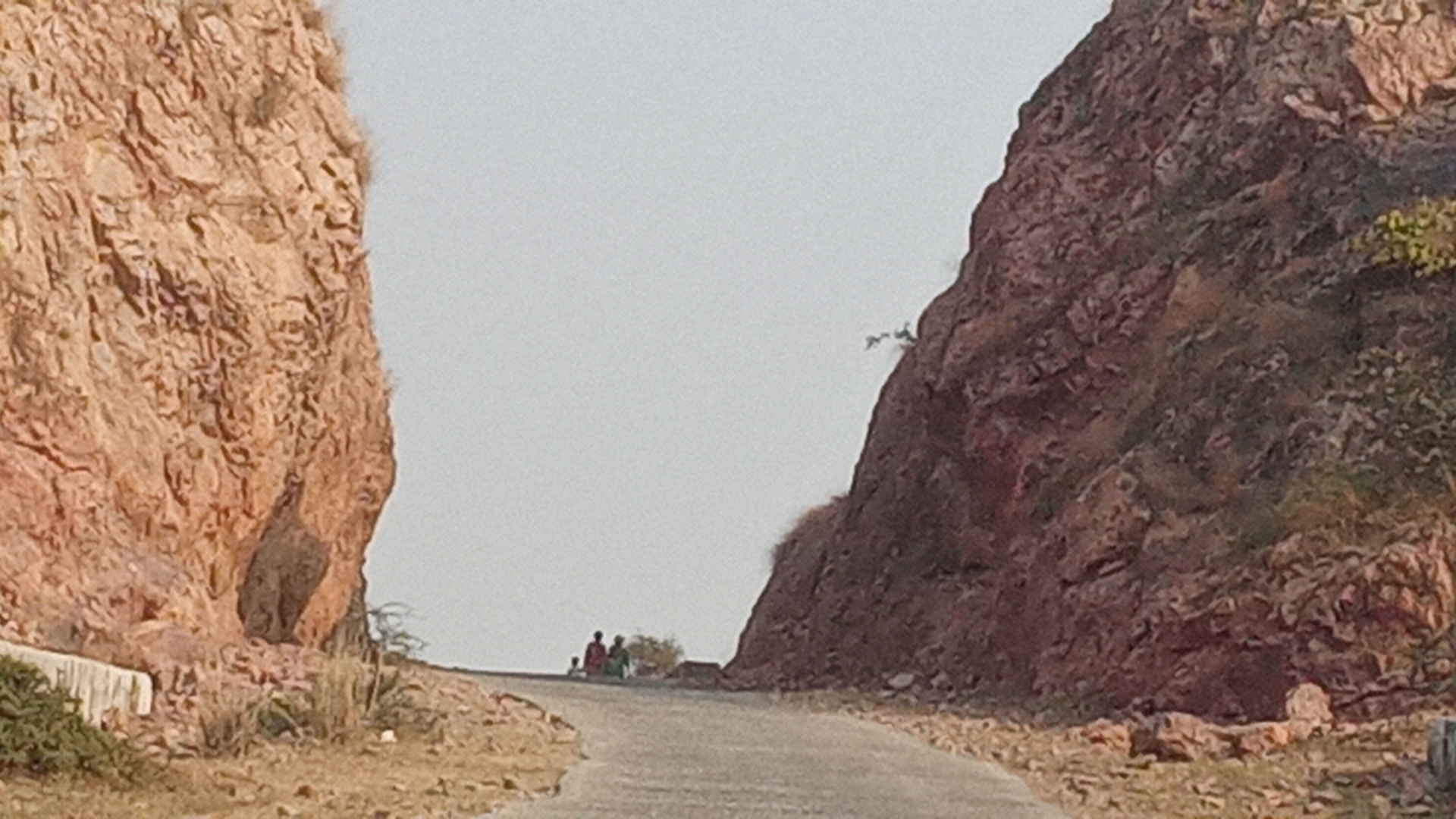
Link between Ghivra Mauja in Gehlaur Ghati to Atara Prakhand Wazirganj made by Dashrath Manjhi in 22 years

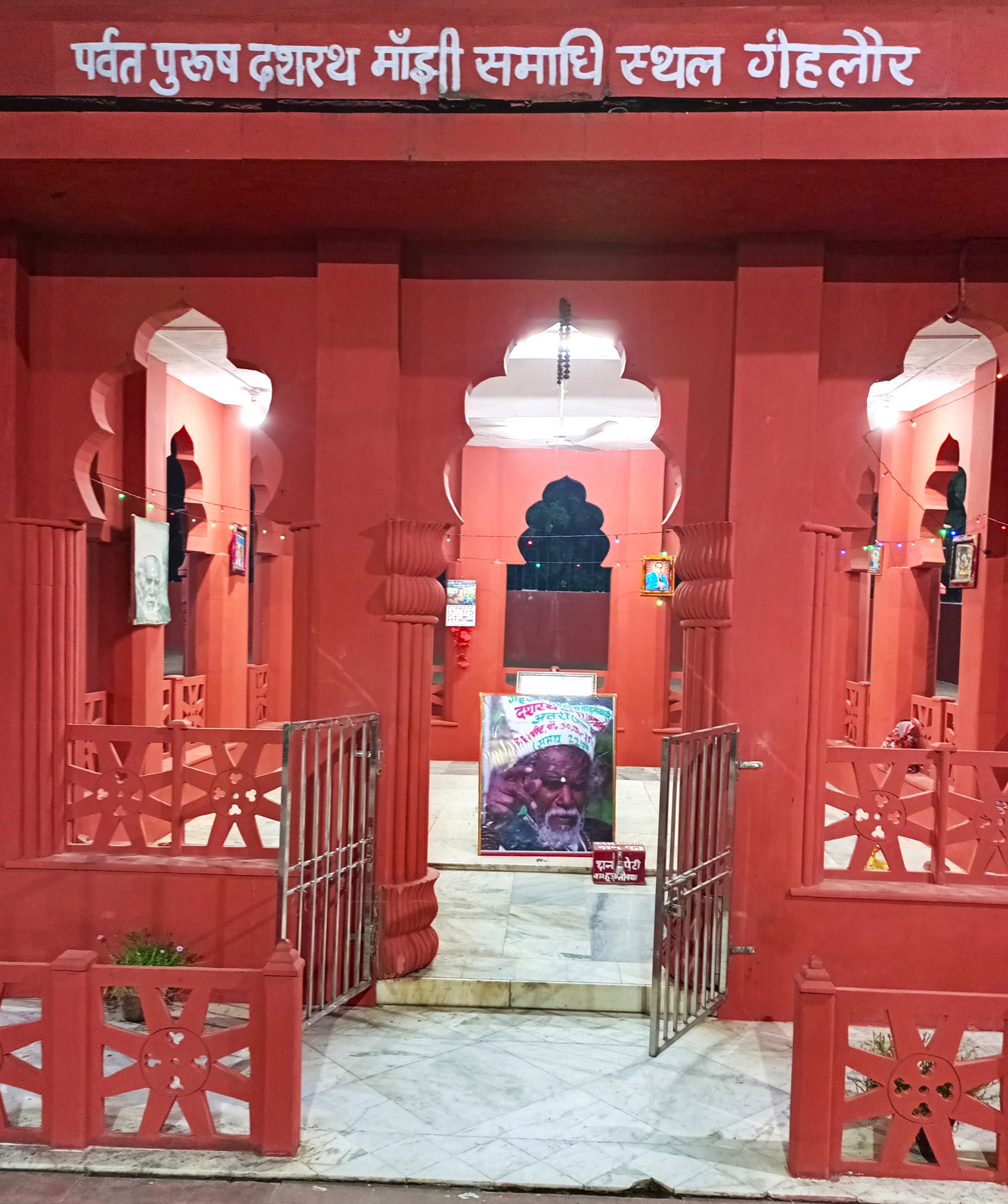
Memorial of Dashrath Manjhi

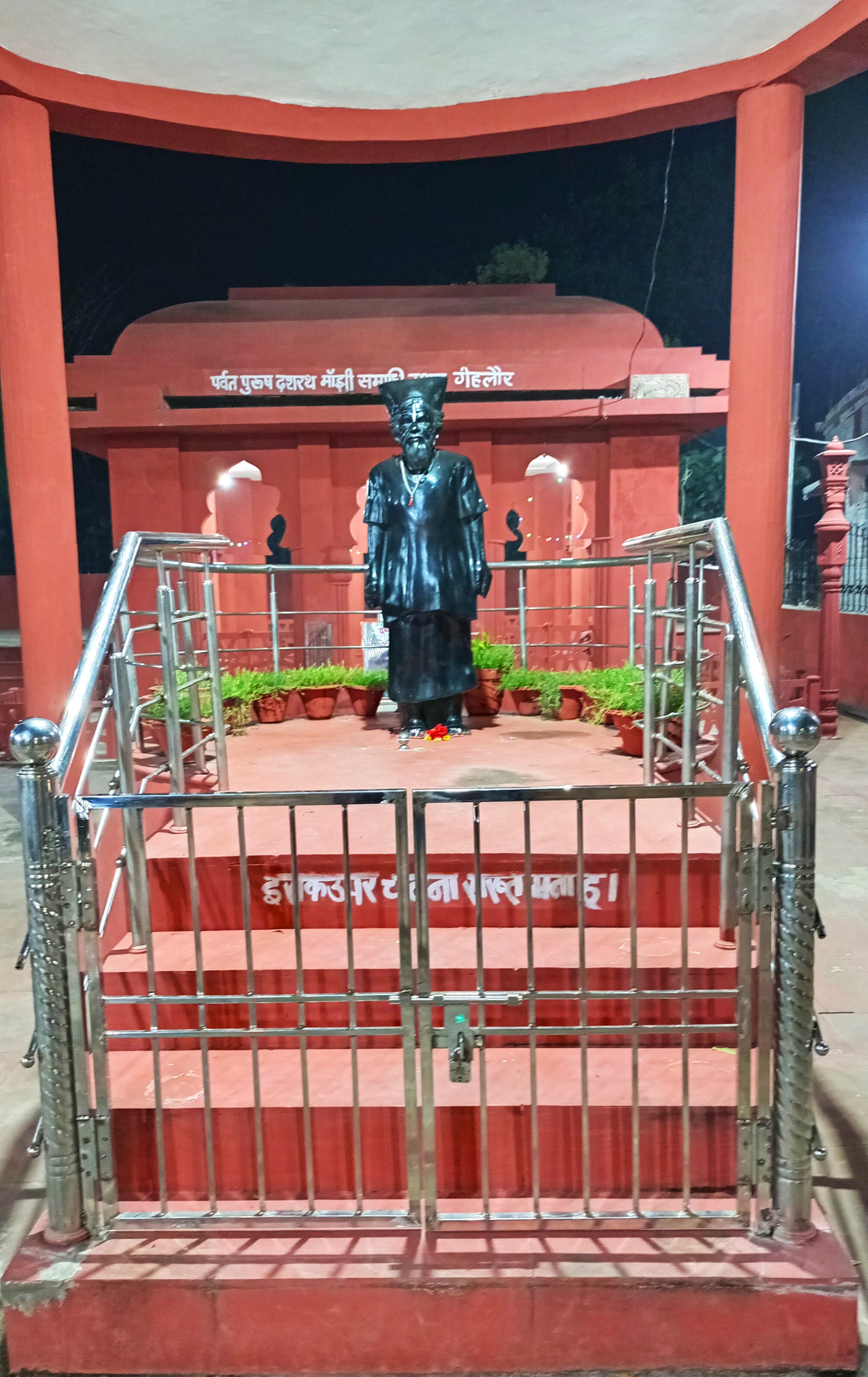
Statue of Dashrath Manjhi

== Sources ==
- "ABP News special: Aamir Visits Mountain Man's Village, Meets his Family". ABP News. 25 February 2014. Archived from the original on 15 December 2021.
- "A Fairy Tale on the Road". Bangalore Mirror. 20 January 2011.
- Celestine, Avinash (24 May 1997). "Love's Labor Brings Down Hill". The Indian Express. Archived from the original on 11 January 2018.
- Damarla, Prashanth (2012). "Dashrath Manjhi – Man Who Moved a Mountain – Facts Analysis". Archived from the original on 29 May 2013.
- "Helping Mountain Man's Family". 4 March 2014. Archived from the original on 7 March 2014.
- Kumar, Alok (17 August 2007). "Mountain Man Dashrath Manjhi Dies in Delhi". Hindustan Times. Archived from the original on 25 August 2013.
- Kumar, Amitava (15 August 2014). "The Story of Jitan Ram Manjhi, from Rat-Eater to Bihar Chief Minister". Quartz India.
- Kumar, Ruchir. "I Am Trying to Be Like Dashrath Manjhi: Aamir Khan". Archived from the original on 27 February 2014.
- "Manjhi Featured in Kannada Film". 22 August 2015. Archived from the original on 4 December 2022.
- "The Mountain Man". The Viewspaper. 28 September 2007. Archived from the original on 27 February 2009.
- "Movie About India's "Mountain Man" Hits Screens". Gulf News. 22 August 2015.
- "Nawazuddin to Play Lead in Ketan Mehta's Mountain Man". Bollywood Hungama. 16 August 2012. Archived from the original on 24 December 2013.
- "Personality Series: Bihar". India Post. 2016. Archived from the original on 22 September 2021.
- Ramnath, Nandini (21 July 2015). "Dashrath Manjhi, Rock Star and Film Muse".
- Qadir, Abdul (24 May 1997). "Tax Rebate to Manjhi Biopic Raises Eyebrows". Times of India.
- Singh, Santosh (1 July 2012). "The man who made way for progress". Indian Express. Archived from the original on 31 July 2015.
- "Dasrath Manjhi's Family Awaits Aamir Khan to Tell his Glorious Tale". news.biharprabha.com. Indo-Asian News Service. 24 February 2014.
