= Abhimanyu Acharya =

Indian short story writer and playwright

- Born: 24 September 1994 (age 31); Surendranagar, Gujarat, India
- Education: St. Xavier's College, Ahmedabad
- Occupations: Short story writer; playwright
- Writing career
- Language: Gujarati
- Notable work: Padchhayao Vacche (2018)
- Notable awards: Yuva Puraskar (2020)

Abhimanyu Acharya (born 24 September 1994) is an Indian short story writer, playwright and theatre director from Gujarat, India. He received the 2020 Yuva Puraskar for his short story collection Padchhayao Vacche ("Between the Shadows").

== Biography ==
Abhimanyu Acharya was born on 24 September 1994 in Surendranagar, Gujarat, India. In 2010, he moved to Ahmedabad where he completed his schooling from St. Xavier's High School, and graduated from St. Xavier's College. At present, he is pursuing his Ph.D. at the University of Western Ontario, Canada in Comparative literature.

== Works ==
Acharya's first short story was published in the Gujarati magazine Navneet Samarpan in 2009. His short story collection, Padchhayao Vacche ("Between the Shadows"), was published by Rangdwar Publication in 2018. His stories deal with themes of love and sexuality, and often combines traditional storytelling with formal experimentation and lyricism. In 2022, his short story "Chunni" appeared in The Greatest Gujarati Stories Ever Told, edited by Rita Kothari.

His play Roundabout was staged in Gujarat and Karnataka. He directed Madhu Rye's Tell Me The Name Of A Flower in 2018.

== Awards ==
Acharya received the 2020 Yuva Puraskar for his short story collection Padchhayao Vacche for which, he also received Gujarat Sahitya Akademi's Best Book Prize (2020). He received the Sanhita Manch playwriting award for his Hindi play Bhes. He was twice longlisted for TOTO Funds the Arts Award for his English writing.

== See also ==
- List of Gujarati-language writers
