= Kamal Sidhu =

Canadian model and actress

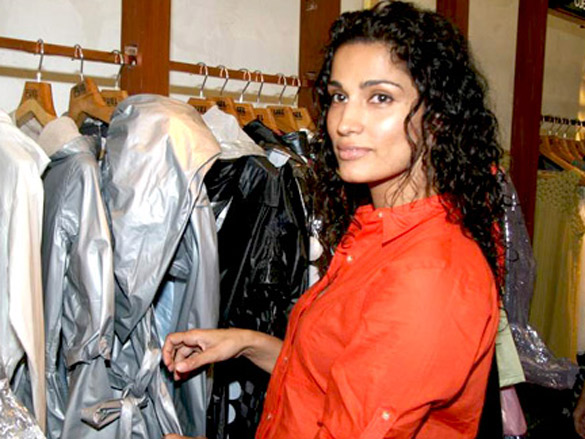
- Sidhu at Soniya Vajifdar preview in 2010
- Born: February 24, 1968 (age 57); Philippines
- Citizenship: Canada
- Occupation(s): actor, presenter, producer, entrepreneur
- Height: 5 ft 9 in (1.75 m)
- Spouse: Nico Goghavala

Kamal Sidhu (born February 24, 1968) is a Canadian actress. She won the Miss India–Canada title in 1991, and has a successful career as an actor, presenter and live show host.

== Early life ==
Sidhu was born in an Indian Sikh family who lived in the Philippines, where she lived till the age of six. Later they moved to Canada, where she was raised and educated. She has a university degree in pre-medical. She is fluent in Tagalog, English, Punjabi and French.

== Career ==
Prior to being in TV shows and in the modeling industry, Sidhu was an athlete, training to compete at the Olympic Games in Atlanta, representing Canada in the heptathlon. An unfortunate injury abruptly ended her dreams and made her to pursue other avenues. She was advised by a cousin, and consequently entered the Miss India-Canada contest in 1991, to which she won first runner-up.

In India, she started her career with Channel V and later MTV Asia. She also worked with channel AXN in this same country. One of the first few 'Indian' VJs, Sidhu and her Canadian accent were hugely popular with the teen population, many imitating her style of dress, hair and talking. She hosted an adult show on Zoom TV and anchored an environmental series called EarthPulse on National Geographic Channel. She presented the Rio Games in August 2016 on Star Sports channel in her brief return to where it all started - STAR TV NETWORK.

== Personal life ==
Kamal Sidhu was in a relationship with erstwhile MTV and Channel V VJ, Danny McGill, during the 1990s. She is married to Nico Ghogavala, owner of B.A.R company.

== Filmography ==
| Year | Film | Role | Notes |
|---|---|---|---|
| 1997 | Aar Ya Paar | Veena Sanghvi | |
| 2006 | Chasing Nature (TV series) | Presenter | |
| 2008 | Little Zizou | Alka | |
| 2019 | The Fakir of Venice | Mandira | |
| 2023 | The Archies | Hermione Lodge | |
