= Mr. Yogi (TV series) =

- Created by: Ketan Mehta
- Based on: Kimball Ravenswood by Madhu Rye
- Starring: Mohan Gokhale, Pallavi Joshi, Channa Ruparel and others
- Narrated by: Om Puri
- Country of origin: India
- Original language: Hindi
- No. of seasons: 1
- No. of episodes: 13

Production
- Producer: Ketan Mehta
- Running time: 22 minutes (approx.)

Original release
- Network: Doordarshan 1
- Release: 1988 – 1989

Mr. Yogi is an Indian comedy mini television series which aired from 1988 to 1989 on DD 1. It is a story of a USA settled Indian boy trying to arrange his marriage in India. It was produced and directed by Ketan Mehta, and starred Mohan Gokhale. It was based on the Gujarati novel Kimball Ravenswood by Madhu Rye which was later adapted into the 2009 movie What's Your Raashee?

== Story ==
An MBA student from America, Yogesh Ishwarlal Patel (a. k. a. Y. I. Patel or Mr. Yogi), meets 12 girls and tries to select one of them as his bride in India. Om Puri narrated the story. The story revolves around Yogi and his search for a perfect bride.

== Cast ==
- Mohan Gokhale - Yogesh Ishwarlal Patel
- Om Puri - Sutradhar / narrator
- Chandrakant Thakkar - Ishwarlal Patel, Mr.Yogi's father
- Arvind Joshi - Uncle
- Ravi Jhankal - Jitubhai
- Channa Ruparel-Anjali, to be bride of Mesh Rashi
- Pallavi Joshi - The bride
- Deepa Sahi - Rohini
- Radha Seth
- Kiran Bir Sethi - Jhankhana
- Sushmita Mukherjee - Keerti
- Savita Bhatia
- Gopi Desai- Aneela
- Anita Sareen
- Rekha Rao - Vishaka
- Rani Gunaji
- Shubhangi Gokhale
- Rajendranath Zutshi Conny
