= Jehangir Choudhary =

Indian cinematographer

- Education: FTII
- Occupation: Cinematographer

Jehangir Choudhary is an Indian cinematographer who works predominantly in Hindi-language films. He received the National Film Award for Best Cinematography for his work on Holi in 1984.

He has collaborated on multiple projects with directors such as Shyam Benegal (Yatra TV series), Ketan Mehta (Holi, Mirch Masala, Hero Hiralal), and actor/filmmaker Kamal Haasan (Chachi 420).

He has also worked with noted filmmakers, including Lekh Tandon, Kundan Shah, Jeffrey D. Brown, and Chandan Arora.

Jehangir teaches cinematography at various film institutes in the country.

Jehangir is an alumnus of the Film and Television Institute of India (FTII).

== Filmography ==
- Dulhan Wohi Jo Piya Man Bhaye (1977)
- Khuda Kasam (1981)
- Sharda (1981)
- Doosri Dulhan (1983)
- Duniya (1984)
- Holi
- Yatra TV series (1986–1987)
- Mirch Masala (1987)
- Hero Hiralal (1988)
- Bhinna Samaya (1992)
- Street Musicians of Bombay (1994)
- Chachi 420 (1997)
- Dil Hai Tumhaara (2002)
- Bas Yun Hi (2003)
- Meri Patni Aur Woh (2005)
- Being Cyrus (2005)
- Hijack (2008)
- Aa Dekhen Zara (2008)
- Oonga (2013)
- Sold (2014)
- Raakhandaar (2014)
