= Manjhi – The Mountain Man =

2015 Indian film by Ketan Mehta

- Theatrical release poster
- Directed by: Ketan Mehta
- Written by: Ketan Mehta; Anjum Rajabali; Mahendra Jhakar; Varadraj Swami; Shahzad Ahemad
- Produced by: Bilal Khan; Deepa Sahi
- Starring: Nawazuddin Siddiqui; Radhika Apte; Urmila Mahanta; Tigmanshu Dhulia; Gaurav Dwivedi
- Cinematography: Rajiv Jain
- Edited by: Pratik Chitalia
- Music by: Sandesh Shandilya; Hitesh Sonik
- Production companies: Viacom 18 Motion Pictures; NFDC; Maya Movies
- Distributed by: Viacom 18 Motion Pictures
- Release date: 21 August 2015
- Running time: 117 minutes
- Country: India
- Language: Hindi
- Box office: est. ₹18 crore (US$1.9 million) 50 weeks

Manjhi – The Mountain Man is a 2015 Indian Hindi-language biographical film based on the life of Dashrath Manjhi, widely known as the "Mountain Man", a poor labourer in Gehlaur village, near Gaya in Bihar, India, who carved a path 9.1 metres (30 ft) wide and 110 metres (360 ft) long through a hill 7.6 metres (25 ft) high, using only a hammer and chisel. The film is directed by Ketan Mehta, jointly produced by Viacom 18 Motion Pictures and NFDC India. Upon release the film received positive critical acclaim.

Nawazuddin Siddiqui enacted the role of Dashrath Manjhi, while Radhika Apte played Manjhi's wife. The film was released worldwide on 21 August 2015. Prior to its release preview copy of movie leaked on the web on 10 August 2015. The Bandra-Kurla Complex (BKC) cyber police station had registered a case against few accused of leaking the movie. The Bihar State Government declared the film tax-free on 30 July 2015.

== Plot ==
In the 1960s Dashrath Manjhi (Nawazuddin Siddiqui) lived in a small village Gehlaur near Gaya, Bihar, India with his family including his wife Phaguniya Devi (Radhika Apte) and his son. There was a rocky mountain near his village that people either had to climb across or travel round to gain access to medical care at the nearest town Wazirganj. One day Manjhi's wife (when pregnant) fell while trying to cross the mountain and eventually died giving birth to a girl, after which Manjhi decided to carve a road through it. When he started hammering the hill people called him a lunatic but that only steeled his resolve further. After 22 years of back-breaking labour, Manjhi carved a path 360 feet long, 25 feet deep in places and 30 feet wide.

Manjhi died in 2007. The film's postscript states that 52 years after he started breaking the mountain, 30 years after he finished and 4 years after his death the government finally made a metalled road to Gehlaur in 2011. He fought with the Indian government for the development of their village and for the availability of hospitals and road.

== Cast ==
- Nawazuddin Siddiqui as Dashrath Manjhi
- Radhika Apte as Phaguniya-Dashrath's wife
- Sneha Pallavi as Phaguniya's Mother
- Tigmanshu Dhulia as Mukhiya (landlord)
- Pankaj Tripathi as Ruab (the landlord's son)
- Gaurav Dwivedi as Alok Jha (a journalist)
- Urmila Mahanta as Lauki
- Ashraful Haque as Magru-Dashrath's father
- Jagat Rawat as Shuklaji
- Varadraj Swami as Gopal's Father
- Deepa Sahi as Prime Minister Indira Gandhi
- Prashant Narayanan as Jhumru
- Rashaana Shah as Bhanwari

== Soundtrack ==
Manjhi – The Mountain Man

Soundtrack album by Sandesh Shandilya, Hitesh Sonik
- Released: 9 August 2015
- Genre: Feature film soundtrack
- Length: 10:45
- Label: Zee Music Company

No.	Title	Lyrics	Music	Singer(s)	Length
1.	"Gehlore Ki Goriya"	Deepak Ramola	Sandesh Shandilya	Bhavin Shastri, Pavni Pandey	3.40
2.	"O Rahi"	Ketan Mehta	Sandesh Shandilya	Bhavin Shastri	4.42
3.	"Dum Kham"	Kumaar	Hitesh Sonik	Divya Kumar	3.03
Total length:					10:45

== Critical reception ==
Sweta Kaushal of Hindustan Times termed the film an inspiring, touching tale of a common man and gave the film 4.5 stars out of 5. Saibal Chatterjee of NDTV gave the film 3 stars. Meena Iyer of Times of India gave it 3 stars. Bollywood Hungama gave it 2.5 stars. Shubhra Gupta of Indian Express gave it two stars.
