= Madhu Rye =

Gujarati-American playwright and writer

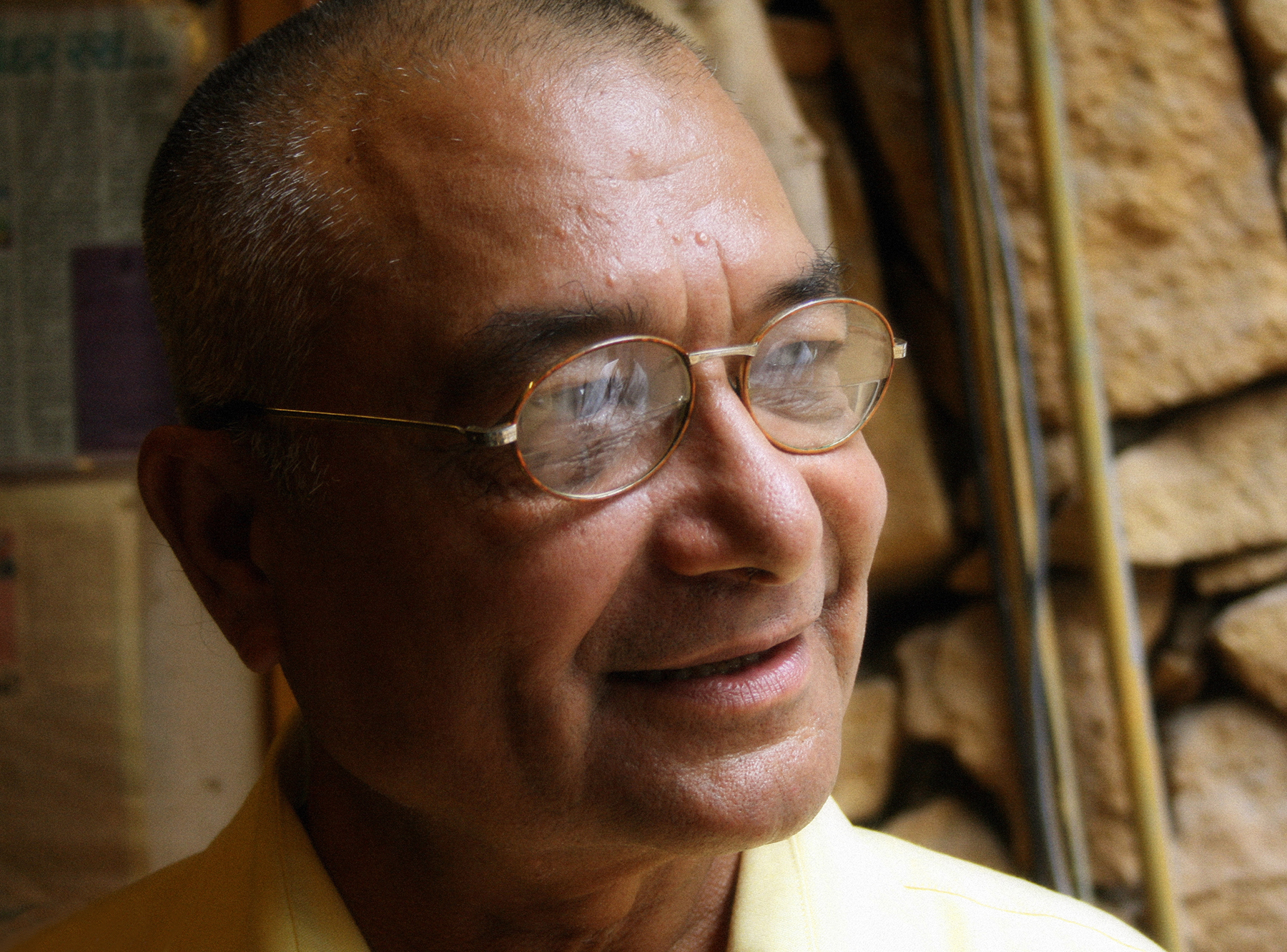
- Madhu Rye in 2009
- Born: Madhusudan Vallabhdas Thaker; 1942 (age 83–84); Jamkhambhaliya, Gujarat
- Education: Bachelor of Arts
- Alma mater: Scottish Church College (1958―1960); University of Calcutta (1963); University of Evansville (1976)
- Occupations: Playwright; novelist; short story writer
- Spouse: Suvarna Bhatt (m. 1974; div. 1989)
- Relatives: Vallabhdas (father); Vijayaben (mother)
- Writing career
- Language: Gujarati
- Notable work: Koi Pan Ek Phool Nu Naam Bolo To (1967)
- Notable awards: Ranjitram Suvarna Chandrak (1999)

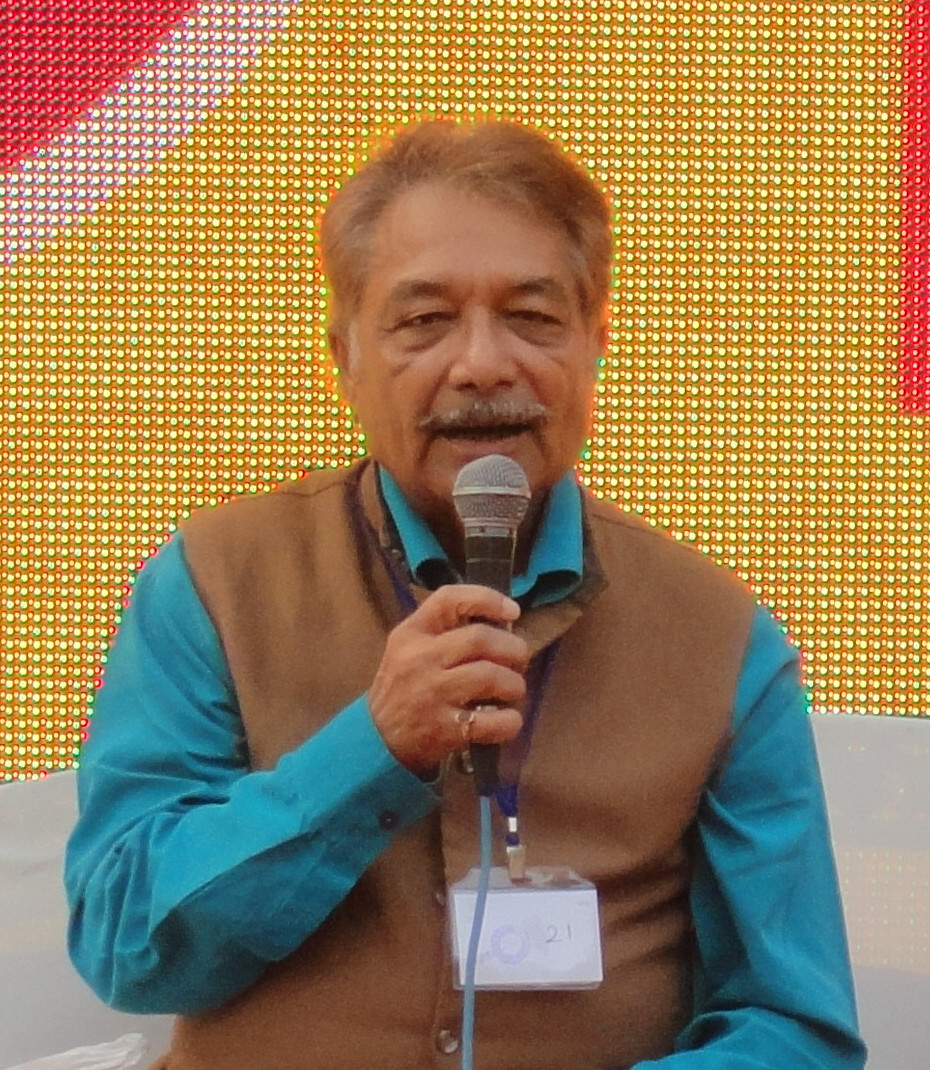
At Gujarat Literature Festival, 2015

Madhusudan Vallabhdas Thaker (born 1942), popularly known as Madhu Rye is a Gujarati playwright, novelist and short story writer. Born in Gujarat and educated at Calcutta, he started writing in the 1960s and became known for his stories and plays. His experience at the University of Hawaii introduced him to experimental writing and improvisations as writing aid, which later led to a movement against absurd theatre. He moved to the US in 1974 and has lived there since. He chiefly wrote novels, short stories and plays. His plays were successful and have been adapted into several languages and media. He has adapted his novels into plays and some plays into novels. The most notable is Kimball Ravenswood, which was loosely adapted into a Hindi TV series Mr. Yogi (1989), and a Hindi film, What's Your Rashee? (2009).

== Early life and education ==
Madhusudan Vallabhdas Thaker was born in 1942 in Jamkhambhaliya, Gujarat to Vallabhdas and Vijayaben. He completed his primary and secondary education in Calcutta. He studied Intermediate Science at Scottish Church College in Calcutta from 1958 to 1960. He did his Bachelor of Arts from University of Calcutta in 1963. He started out by translating the short stories of Gujarati writer Shivkumar Joshi, in Hindi, under the pen name Madhu Rye.

== Career ==
Rye was encouraged by Shivkumar Joshi and Chandrakant Bakshi to write his own short stories. He taught for a brief period and worked in a machinery concern for few years. He wrote his first short story for a contest under the pen name "Madhu Rye" and won second prize. He moved to Ahmedabad in 1967 and joined Navneetlal and Co. as a marketing writer.

His play Koi Pan Ek Phool Nu Naam Bolo To (Tell Me the Name of a Flower) premiered in 1969, directed by Mrinalini Sarabhai and produced by Darpana Academy. He went to Honolulu, US in 1970 and studied stagecraft, especially playwriting and direction at the University of Hawaii for two semesters.

After returning in 1971, he founded Aakanth Sabarmati, a playwrights' workshop to preach minimalist style and the importance of improvisation in plays, against the prevalent absurd theatre.

In 1974, he married Suvarna Bhatt. In 1974, he, along with his wife, moved to the US to study for a MA in continuing education with special emphasis on creative writing at the University of Evansville, Evansville, Indiana. He later separated from her.

Rye settled in the US and started the Gujarati weekly in 1978. He also edited Gujarat Times, published from New York City. He now lives in New Jersey, and has edited the Gujarati short story magazine Mamata since 2011.

== Works ==
Rye is an experimental and modernist writer. He created the style of formless prose writing called "harmonica" for some of his short stories. He chiefly wrote fiction and plays. He adapted his novels into plays and vice versa. His plays were adapted into several languages including Hindi, Marathi and English. His short stories and plays became very popular in 1960s.

=== Short stories ===
Banshi Naamni Ek Chhokri (1964) was his first short story collection with experimental modern styles. Roopkatha (1972) is a collection of twenty-eight stories in traditional as well as "harmonica" style. His other work Kaalsarp (1972) has humour and imagination. Kautuk (2005) is his short story collection.. Roop Roop Amber (2025) is his latest collection fo short stories.

=== Novels ===
Chehra (1966) is his experimental novel. Kimball Ravenswood (1973) is a story of a non-resident Indian searching for a bride in India, intertwined with mock astrology. Kalpataru (1987) is a futuristic mystery science fiction novel. He also adapted three novels from his own plays; Kamini (1970) from Koi Pan Ek Phool Nu Naam Bolo To (1968), Sabha (1972) from Kumarni Agashi (1975), Saapbaji from Aapne Club ma Malya Hata. They all are psychological thrillers. Mukhsukh (2001) and Sura, Sura, Sura are his other novels.

His novel Kimball Ravenswood was adapted into plays in several languages including The Suitable Bride in English and Yogesh Patelnu Vevishal in Gujarati. It was also adapted into a TV series entitled Mr. Yogi (1989), and as the film What's Your Rashee? (2009).

=== Plays ===
Koi Pan Ek Phool Nu Naam Bolo To (Tell Me the Name of a Flower, 1968), Kumar ni Agashi (The Terrace, 1975) and Aapne Club ma Malya Hata, Pankor Nake Jaake, Sura Ane Shatrujeet are his plays. Koi pan Ek Phoolnu Naam Bolo To was translated into fourteen languages, and broadcast by the All India Radio and adapted as a telefilm by Ketan Mehta for Doordarshan. It was a meta-theatrical murder mystery. Yogesh Patelnu Vevishal is an adaptation of his novel Kimball Ravenswood. His later plays were performed by the Indian National Theatre, directed by Pravin Joshi. His play Kumar Ni Agashi created a sensation in the field of Gujarati theatre. It was about repressed sexuality in upper middle class society.

Ashwatthama (1973), Aapnu Evun (2005) and Kanta Kahe are collections of one-act plays including some absurd plays. Aakanth (1974) is a collection of selected twenty-three plays with novel ideas from more than fifty plays by various writers which were written during the activities of Aakanth Sabarmati. Mrs Moorthy was his first English language play. His one act play Ashwatthama was once a popular entry in college competitions along with his other one act plays. His play Sura ane Shatrujeet is sporadically performed by amateur groups in Gujarat and Mumbai.

He has also adapted various plays into Gujarati including: George Bernard Shaw's Pygmalion and its musical adaptation My Fair Lady as a musical Santu Rangilee (1976), Friedrich Dürrenmatt's The Visit as Sharat and Anthony Shaffer's Sleuth as Khelando. These all adaptations earned him wide acclaim. His Gujarati adaptation of Dale Wasserman's play One Flew Over the Cuckoo's Nest (based on Ken Kesey's 1962 novel of the same name) was mildly successful.

His plays have been adapted and performed in several Indian languages and have been hugely successful. "Koi Pan Phool..." has been translated, adapted and performed in English by Dr. Vijay Padaki (Tell me the Name of a Flower). It was also made in Marathi as 'Hi Shekhar Khosla kon Hoto?'. Dr. Padaki also adapted Kumar ni Agashi and performed in Bangalore in English (The Terrace). The Hindi translation was done by Ismat Chugtai as 'Neela Kamra' and the play was directed by late Shafi Inamdar . Both these plays continue to be performed regularly at amateur theatre fest/competitions.

=== Essays ===
Rye has been an avid writer of essays, published as weekly columns in several publications, such as Navroz, Janmabhoomi, Samkaleen, and Abhiyaan. He writes a weekly column Neele Gagan Ke Tale (Under the Big Blue Sky) in Gujarati daily Divya Bhaskar since 2008.

His essay collections are Neele Gagan Ke Tale, Mann Ki Been, Sepia, Dil Ki Gali, Kefiyat.. Yaar ane Dildar {{[[collection of character sketches of people from the cultural work (2024)

=== Translation ===
He translated three works into Gujarati; The Scarlet Letter, Heaven Knows, Mr. Allison and The Light in the Forest. Kahan is his translation of a work by Mrinalini Sarabhai.

== Awards ==
He was awarded Narmad Suvarna Chandrak in 1972. He received the Ranjitram Suvarna Chandrak for 1999. He received the Bhupen Khakhar Award in 2004 for his play, Sura Ane Shatrujeet. He also received the Sahitya Gaurav puraskar award in 2020

== See also ==
- List of Gujarati-language writers
