= Bhookamp =

- Theatrical release poster
- Directed by: Gautam Adhikari
- Written by: Shahab Shamsi; Sanjay Kumar; Javed Akthar; Mahendra Dehelvi; Vinu Mahendra; Dev Kohli (lyrics)
- Produced by: Makrand Adhikari
- Starring: Jeetendra; Rahul Roy; Mamta Kulkarni; Deepa Sahi
- Cinematography: Charudutt Dukhande
- Edited by: Radhe Shyam
- Music by: Jatin–Lalit
- Production company: Sri Adhikari Brothers Television Network Ltd.
- Release date: 25 June 1993
- Running time: 144 minutes
- Country: India
- Language: Hindi

Bhookamp (transl. Earthquake) is a 1993 Indian Hindi-language action film, produced by Markand Adhikari under the Sri Adhikari Brothers banner and directed by Gautam Adhikari. It stars Jeetendra, Rahul Roy, Mamta Kulkarni, Deepa Sahi in the pivotal roles and music composed by Jatin–Lalit. This was the debut movie for villain Mohan Joshi, prior to that, he had worked in Marathi movies. Bhookamp is a crime thriller, made on the International Drug cartel, Syndicate, operating in India, through Extortion, in local parlance, the "Supari" killers.

== Plot ==
Satyajeet Anand is an editor of a newspaper, "The New Daily Times", portrayed by Suresh Oberoi, who is always hell-bent on exposing the criminals, dissuaded by his wife Pooja (Deepa Sahi), who fears their wrath. He helps Ajay in knowing who are the people who are corrupting the society, but is brutally murdered by them. His sister Kavita (Mamta Kulkarni), thereafter, is publicly disrobed in the college library by drug peddler Jaggi. Ajay does not keep quiet now, and refuses to be a mere spectator to the heinous crime that the Illegal drug trade is. He wreaks havoc in bloody revenge by eliminating all the anti-social elements from the society. However, in the end, he is punished by the courts with life imprisonment, for taking the law into his own hands.

== Cast ==
- Jeetendra as Professor Ajay Saxena
- Rahul Roy as Inspector Rahul Singh
- Mamta Kulkarni as Kavita Anand
- Deepa Sahi as Mrs. Pooja Satyajeet Anand
- Rohini Hattangadi as Mrs. D'Sa
- Mohan Joshi as Gangster Daya Patil
- Navin Nischol as Mahendra Khanna
- Suresh Oberoi as Editor Satyajeet Anand
- Achyut Potdar as Professor Gupta
- Ajit Vachani as Maniklal Shah
- Mahavir Shah as Mahesh Shah
- Johny Lever as Murli
- Anant Mahadevan as Akhtar
- Deven Bhojani
- Siddharth Randeria

== Soundtrack ==
#	Song	Singer
1.	"Tum Jo Mile"	Kumar Sanu, Alka Yagnik
2.	"1, 2, 3, 4, Dil Pe Chale Na Zor"	Kumar Sanu, Kavita Krishnamurthy
3.	"Yahi Woh Jagah Thi"	Kumar Sanu, Alka Yagnik
4.	"Bheega Bheega Hai Mausam"	Udit Narayan, Sadhana Sargam
5.	"Hai Usi Ki Duniya"	Abhijeet
6.	"Tan Man Mile Toh Kya"	Asha Bhosle
