= Maya Memsaab =

- Poster
- Directed by: Ketan Mehta
- Written by: Hriday Lani (dialogue); Gulan Kriplani (Maya's monologues)
- Screenplay by: Sitanshu Yashaschandra; Ketan Mehta
- Based on: Madame Bovary by Gustave Flaubert
- Produced by: Ketan Mehta
- Starring: Deepa Sahi; Farooq Shaikh; Shah Rukh Khan; Raj Babbar; Paresh Rawal
- Cinematography: Anoop Jotwani
- Edited by: Renu Saluja
- Music by: Hridaynath Mangeshkar; Gulzar (lyrics)
- Release date: 2 July 1993
- Running time: 130 minutes
- Country: India
- Language: Hindi
- Box office: est. ₹1.85 crore (equivalent to ₹15 crore or US$1.6 million in 2026) 1.85 crore

Maya Memsaab (transl. Lady Maya or Madam Maya) (also known as Maya and Maya: The Enchanting Illusion in English) is a 1993 Indian Hindi-language mystery drama film directed by Ketan Mehta starring Farooq Shaikh, Deepa Sahi, Paresh Rawal, Shah Rukh Khan and Raj Babbar. The film is based on the famous Gustave Flaubert's 1857 novel Madame Bovary. Maya Memsaab won the National Film Award – Special Mention (Feature Film) in the year 1993. The rights of this film are now owned by Shah Rukh Khan's Red Chillies Entertainment.

== Synopsis ==
Young, beautiful, and intelligent Maya lives with her father in a palatial mansion in Shimla, India. When her father suffers a stroke, she calls for local Dr. Charu Das, who arrives on his bicycle and prescribes treatment for her father. He continues to come to her house often, more on the pretext of seeing her than her father. Eventually, they get married. Years pass by and Dr. Charu gets engrossed in treating patients, leaving Maya alone to reflect on her own fate and life. It is not long before a young man named Rudra enters her life and an affair follows. This does not last long though, as a much younger man, Lalit, enters her life and they begin another passionate affair. But again, Maya is not satisfied as she longs for more than carnal needs. Time and time again, this bored housewife gets attracted to costly objects and spends recklessly on clothes and furniture, even if she has to borrow money. She eventually is forced to mortgage her house to a man called Lalaji. Finally, reality catches up with her. Lalaji brings a court order to take possession of her house. Rudra and Lalit desert her and this leads her to drink a mystical drink that was earlier being advertised on the streets to give you one wish on the condition you had a pure heart. The drink causes her to flash brightly and disappear. This leaves two investigators to probe who or what really killed Maya.

== Cast ==
- Deepa Sahi as Maya Das
- Farooq Sheikh as Dr. Charu Das
- Raj Babbar as Rudra Pratap Singh
- Shahrukh Khan as Lalit
- Paresh Rawal as Lalaji
- Raghubir Yadav as the mentally sick street-beggar
- Shrivallabh Vyas as Detective
- Shreeram Lagoo as Maya's father
- Farah as Chhaya Das, Dr. Charu's daughter.
- Sudha Shivpuri
- Rajesh Vivek
- Om Puri as Detective

== Controversy ==
The real trouble began when a film magazine ran a fabricated story claiming that Mehta had asked Sahi to “spend a night” with Khan to prepare for the scene—an absurdity that infuriated the young actor. Shah Rukh stormed into the publication’s office; a confrontation followed, threats were exchanged, and a police complaint ensued. One report even claimed he was briefly arrested. The incident exposed how easily gossip could wound careers in the absence of accountability. It also marked one of Shah Rukh’s earliest collisions with fame’s darker side—learning, almost overnight, how quickly perception can rewrite truth.

== Soundtrack ==
This album is composed by Hridayanath Mangeshkar, & Lyrics by Gulzar. most of the song sang by Lata Mangeshkar. Most popular song in album "Ek Haseen Nigah Ka" sang by Kumar Sanu.

#	Song	Singer
1.	"Ek Haseen Nigah Ka (Male)"	Kumar Sanu
2.	"Ek Haseen Nigah Ka (Female)"	Lata Mangeshkar
3.	"Khud Se Batein"	Lata Mangeshkar
4.	"Ye Shahar Bada"	Lata Mangeshkar
5.	"O Dil Banjare"	Lata Mangeshkar
6.	"Mere Sarhane Jalao Sapne"	Lata Mangeshkar
7.	"Chhaya Jagi"	Hridaynath Mangeshkar
