= Mangal Pandey: The Rising =

2005 Indian film by Ketan Mehta

- Theatrical release poster
- Directed by: Ketan Mehta
- Written by: Farrukh Dhondy
- Dialogues by: Ranjit Kapoor
- Story by: Farrukh Dhondy
- Produced by: Aamir Khan; Bobby Bedi; Deepa Sahi
- Starring: Aamir Khan; Toby Stephens; Rani Mukerji; Ameesha Patel; Kirron Kher
- Narrated by: Om Puri
- Cinematography: Himman Dhamija
- Edited by: A. Sreekar Prasad
- Music by: A. R. Rahman
- Production companies: Kaleidoscope Entertainment; TKF Films
- Distributed by: Yash Raj Films
- Release date: 12 August 2005
- Running time: 151 minutes
- Country: India
- Language: Hindi
- Budget: ₹37 crore
- Box office: ₹52.57 crore

Mangal Pandey: The Rising (internationally known as The Rising: Ballad of Mangal Pandey) is a 2005 Indian biographical historical drama film based on the life of Mangal Pandey, an Indian soldier known for helping to spark the Indian Rebellion of 1857 (also known as The First War of Indian Independence). It is directed by Ketan Mehta, produced by Bobby Bedi and written by Farrukh Dhondy. The film stars Aamir Khan in the lead role, marking his comeback after he had gone into hiatus following Dil Chahta Hai (2001). Toby Stephens, Rani Mukerji, Ameesha Patel, and Kirron Kher appear in supporting roles.

The film premiered in the Marché du Film section of the 2005 Cannes Film Festival and was released in India on 12 August 2005. It was the fourth highest-grossing Hindi film of 2005.

== Plot ==
It is the year 1857, and a large part of the Indian subcontinent is under the control of the British East India Company. On 7 April, in Barrackpore in West Bengal, Mangal Pandey (Aamir Khan), a sepoy (soldier of Indian origin) in the 34th Bengal Native Infantry of the company's army, is being led to his execution by hanging for fomenting a mutiny against company rule. Witnessing the execution is Pandey's friend, Captain William Gordon (Toby Stephens), who is relieved when the execution is delayed due to the hangman's refusal to hang Pandey. The film then flashes back to four years earlier. While fighting in the Emirate of Afghanistan, Pandey saves Gordon's life by dragging him to safety when the two were targeted by Afghan snipers. Afterwards, Gordon seeks out Pandey at a camp and offers him his pistol as a token of gratitude. Three years later (31 December 1856), during the New Year Eve's ball at the Governor General's palace in Calcutta, Pandey angers Captain Hewson (Ben Nealon) when he attempts to stop him from severely beating an Indian servant for inadvertently touching Emily Kent, the daughter of Mr. Graham Kent, an influential British businessman. Gordon witnesses the assault but does not stop it, leading to tension with Pandey. However, he apologizes to Pandey during a wrestling match, and a friendship is formed between them transcending rank, colour and race.

The company then introduces a new weapon in January 1857 for its troops: the Enfield rifled musket. Rumours spread among the sepoys that the paper cartridges holding the powder and ball for the rifle are greased with either pig fat or beef tallow; the process of loading the rifle requires the soldier to bite down on the cartridge, and the soldiers believe that this would cause them to consume pork or beef — acts abhorrent to Muslim and Hindu soldiers, respectively, for religious reasons. A low-caste labourer named Nainsukh teases Pandey, a Brahmin, that he has lost his caste by using such a gun, but Pandey dismisses Nainsukh's taunts. The sepoys, led by Pandey, express their concerns to General Hearsey (Jeremy Clyde), but he reassures them that no such cartridge exists. The sepoys remain concerned when they are asked to test-fire the new rifle at musketry drill, but Gordon, after talking to Hearsey, reiterates that no such cartridge exists and asks a sepoy to test-fire the rifle. Pandey volunteers, and his fellow sepoys chastise him afterward. However, demonstrating his trust in Gordon, he states his belief that the rumours are untrue.

Meanwhile, Gordon stops a Sati ceremony from occurring and rescues a widow, Jwala (Ameesha Patel). He arranges for her to be treated, and the two gradually become closer, eventually having an affair. Also, Pandey further earns Captain Hewson's ire by stopping him from trying to rape a tawaif named Heera (Rani Mukerji), who was sold to a brothel run by Lal Bibi (Kirron Kher). He suffers a serious beating from Hewson and three other officers the next day, but Gordon intervenes and saves Pandey. Pandey meets Heera at the brothel afterwards, and they begin to fall in love with each other. Some time later, Nainsukh takes Pandey and some other sepoys to see the factory, owned by Mr. Kent, where the cartridge grease is made; indeed, the grease turns out to be pig fat and beef tallow. Pandey, believing Gordon lied to him, returns Gordon's pistol and ends their friendship.

Hearing of the 34th Regiment's refusal to use the rifles, the 19th Regiment at Berhampore also refuses to use them in a parade at the ground on 12 February 1857, and mutiny brews among the sepoys. Gordon unsuccessfully attempts to dissuade Pandey and the mutineers from rebelling, and is likewise unsuccessful at convincing Major General George Anson (Christopher Adamson), the Commander-in-Chief, India, to abandon using the cartridges. The mutineers, meanwhile, meet with Tatya Tope (Deepraj Rana) and his messenger Azimullah (Shahbaz Khan) and they all agree to unite under the leadership of the elderly Mughal emperor Bahadur Shah Zafar (Habib Tanvir) and rise in rebellion. Anson decides to send the Queen's Regiment from Rangoon to intercept and subdue the rebels; it is scheduled to arrive in Berhampore on 1 April. Heera informs Pandey of this plan, having spent the previous night with Hewson. The rebels revise their timetable to march on 30 March, but the wife of one of the rebels, angry at her husband after an argument in which he tells her of the impending revolt, informs her British employer woman of the plans. As the employer woman is having an affair with Hewson at the time, he overhears the conversation and later tortures the rebel into revealing the date of the march.

On 29 March, the mutineers are informed of the Rangoon Regiment's arrival. Pandey attempts to rally them into fending off the attack, and when the officers, including Gordon, inquire as to what they are doing, the rebels turn on them. With the regiment's arrival, the mutineers want to throw down their weapons; Pandey, however, fires at the opposing forces, killing two and injuring four. Later on, he was court-martialed, and Gordon testified on his behalf, passionately defending his actions and warning of bloody rebellion if he is hanged. Despite Gordon's warning, the court-martial imposes a death sentence on Pandey. The night before Pandey's execution, Heera visits him in his jail cell and has him place sindoor on her forehead, marking their marriage.

The next day (on 8 April), in front of Gordon, the British officers, his fellow sepoys, and the townspeople, Pandey is hanged. Inspired by his execution, the spectators break out in revolt. The film ends with drawings of the Indian Rebellion of 1857, and footage of the later Indian independence movement.

== Cast ==
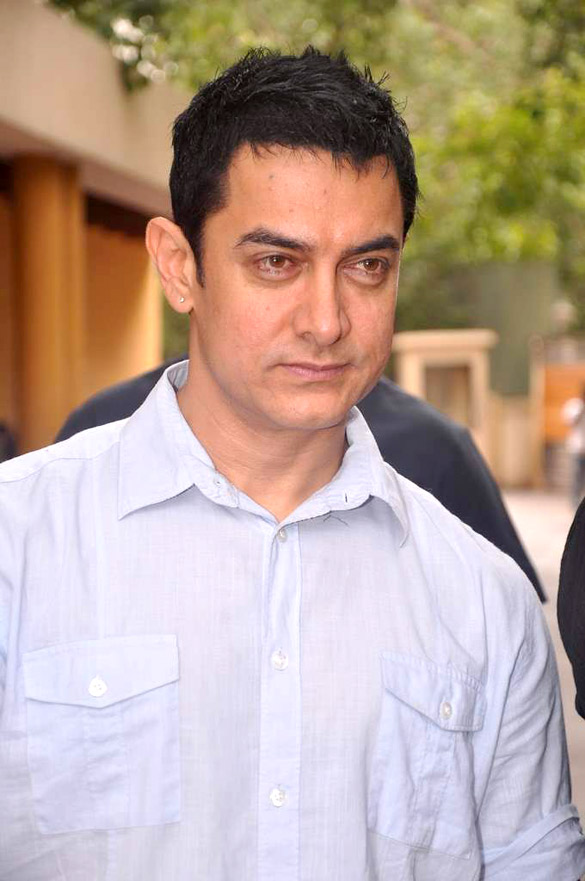
The film marked the comeback of actor Aamir Khan who went into a hiatus after Dil Chahta Hai which was released in 2001.

- Aamir Khan as Mangal Pandey
- Toby Stephens as Captain William Gordon
- Rani Mukerji as Heera
- Ameesha Patel as Jwala
- Coral Beed as Emily Kent
- Kirron Kher as Lol Bibi
- Ben Nealon as Captain Hewson
- Habib Tanvir as Bahadur Shah Zafar
- Varsha Usgaonkar as Rani Laxmibai
- Kenneth Cranham as Mr. Kent
- Tom Alter as Watson
- Mukesh Tiwari as Bakht Khan
- Shahbaz Khan as Azimullah Khan
- Amin Hajee as Vir Singh
- Dibyendu Bhattacharya as Krupashankar Singh
- Ahsan Bakshi as Hassan Ali
- Chirag Vohra as Bhujavan Shukla
- Sanjay Swaraj as Jemari Ishwari Prasad
- Tarun Kumar as Rahmat Ali
- Ram Gopal Bajaj as Sarpanch
- Shrirang Godbole as Nana Saheb
- Sohrab Ardeshir as Sorabji, a Parsi trader
- Atul Kumar as Nainsukh
- Deepraj Rana as Tatya Tope
- Mona Ambegaonkar as Kamla Singh
- Jeremy Clyde as Hearsey
- Simon Chandler as Officer Lockwood
- Christopher Adamson as General Anson
- Steven Rimkus as Colonel William Mitchell
- Lalit Tiwari as Davar Ali
- Anupam Shyam as Choudhary
- Murali Sharma as Shaikh Paltu
- Vivek Mushran as Zakhmi poet
- Albert Welling as Lord Charles Canning
- Joanne Slater as Mrs. Canning
- Howard Lee as Mr. Quartermaster
- Jayne McKenna as Mrs. Quartermaster
- Lisa Millett as Mrs. Wheeler
- Pankaj Jha as Mendicant Musician
- Sulabha Arya as Vir Singh's mother
- Neeraj Sood as Bangdu
- Chittaranjan Giri as Slave trader
- Disha Vakani as Yasmin
- Ravi Jhankal as Sulfi Singer
- Kailash Kher as Sulfi Singer
- Dinesh Lamba as Bearer
- Rajesh Tailang as Brahim Sepoy
- Subrat Dutta as Parmanand Jha, Mangal's friend
- Sophiya Haque as dancer in the song "Rasiya"

== Production ==
Aishwarya Rai was initially signed for the role of Jwala. However, she was later replaced by Ameesha Patel due to a disagreement with the producers.

In 2023, Patel revealed that Rani Mukerji initially did not have a lead role in the film and only had a guest appearance. Aamir Khan was also romantically paired opposite a British character according to the original script. But, during filming, Khan felt that audiences would be able to relate to the film in a stronger manner if he had an onscreen love angle with an Indian character. Therefore, Mukerji's role in the film was extended.

== Release ==
=== Box office ===
Mangal Pandey: The Rising, had a great start at the box office but was declared average by Box Office India. It grossed ₹39.92 crore (US$4.1 million) at the Indian box office and ₹52.57 crore (US$5.5 million) worldwide.

The film topped the Chennai box office on its opening weekend.

=== Critical reception ===
Upon release, Mangal Pandey received positive reviews. On review aggregator Rotten Tomatoes, 85% of 13 critics gave the film a positive review. Taran Adarsh of IndiaFM gave four stars out of five saying it is "A genuine attempt at bringing alive a great hero on celluloid, the film will only bring pride and prestige in the domestic market as well as on the international platform."

Raja Sen of Rediff panned the film as being about "cleavage and cliche".

Derek Elley of Variety commented, "This is the classic structure of all the best historical epics, and though the film employs recognizable Bollywood trademarks, helmer [director] Mehta's approach is more "Western" in its rhythms, pacing and avoidance of Asian melodrama. Musical set pieces are more integrated into the action, and the focus is kept tightly on the Gordon-Pandey relationship."

Film scholar Omer Mozaffar of RogerEbert.com commented that this film is a study in imperialism and sensitivity, comparing the issue of the rifle grease to the 1992 Los Angeles riots and the Jyllands-Posten Muhammad cartoons controversy. The inciting event that leads to the Rising could have been avoided or quickly rectified. However, in the context of the situation, it was a larger issue of unrest due to negligent power brokers.

=== Controversy ===
The Bhartiya Janata Party demanded a ban on the film, accusing it of showing falsehood and indulging in character assassination of Mangal Pandey. As an example, the BJP spokesman stated that the film shows Mangal Pandey visiting the house of a prostitute. The Samajwadi Party leader Uday Pratap Singh called in the Rajya Sabha for the movie to be banned for its "inaccurate portrayal" of Pandey. The Uttar Pradesh government criticised the film for "distortion" of historical facts, and considered banning it. Protestors in Ballia district, where Pandey had been a native, damaged a shop selling cassettes and CDs of the film, stalled a goods train on its way to Chapra (Bihar), and staged a sit-in on the Ballia-Barriya highway.

A recently (2014) published analysis of the opening stages of the Great Indian Rebellion is critical of the lack of historical evidence supporting the events of 1857, as portrayed in Mangal Pandey: The Rising.

== Awards and nominations ==
=== 51st Filmfare Awards ===
- Best Actor – Aamir Khan (Nominated)

== Soundtrack ==
Mangal Pandey: The Rising

Soundtrack album by A. R. Rahman
- Released: 8 July 2005 (India)
- Studio: Panchathan Record Inn and AM Studios
- Genre: Feature film soundtrack
- Label: YRF Music
- Producer: Bobby Bedi

A. R. Rahman chronology
Kisna: The Warrior Poet (2005)	Mangal Pandey: The Rising (2005)	Anbe Aaruyire (2005)

The music of the film was composed by A. R. Rahman with lyrics written by Javed Akhtar.

No.	Title	Singers	Length
1.	"Al Madad Maula"	A. R. Rahman, Kailash Kher, Murtuza Khan, Kadhir	5:58
2.	"Holi Re"	Aamir Khan, Udit Narayan, Madhushree, Chinmayi, Srinivas	4:53
3.	"Main Vari Vari"	Kavita Krishnamurthy, Reena Bhardwaj	4:54
4.	"Mangal Mangal – Aatma"	Kailash Kher, Sukhwinder Singh	4:19
5.	"Mangal Mangal – Agni"	Kailash Kher	2:55
6.	"Mangal Mangal"	Kailash Kher	2:31
7.	"Rasiya"	Richa Sharma, Bonnie Chakraborty	5:57
8.	"Takey Takey"	Sukhwinder Singh, Kailash Kher, Kartick Das Baul	4:35

== See also ==
- List of Asian historical drama films
