= Koi Pan Ek Phool Nu Naam Bolo To =

Play by Madhu Rye

Koi Pan Ek Phool Nu Naam Bolo To (English: Tell Me The Name of a Flower) is a 1967 Indian psychological-thriller play by Gujarati writer Madhu Rye.

== Background ==
Madhu Rye wrote Koi Pan Ek Phool Nu Naam Bolo To in 1967 for Ahmedabad based theatre group Darpana. It was translated into English by Vijay Padaki and published in Three Gujarati Plays by Madhu Rye (2007).

== Characters ==
- Jagannath Pathak/Pramod – leader of the theatre troupe
- Kamini Desai/Kanta – lead actress of the troupe
- Sundar Desai/Niranjan – member of the troupe and Kamini's brother
- Swati Soni/Bhabhi – member of the troupe, Pritam Soni's wife and Niranjan's lover
- Pritam Soni/Nandlal – member of the troupe and Swati's Husband
- Keshav Thaker/Deshpande – playwright of the troupe

== Plot ==
The play is written in four acts.

The first act starts with a typical middle-class household scene, where Kanta and Niranjan are tensed that Kanta's husband Pramod will find out about their secret love affair. To settle the matters, a meeting is called upon which also involves their friends Nandlal and Bhabhi. Things proceed in a funny manner where each character feels guilty and wishes to kill himself/herself. The dialogues mostly involve witty repartee and talks around infidelity and sexual morality. However, at the end of the first act, Kanta gets down in the audience and kills a member sitting in the first row.

The second act radically shifts the tone of the play. Suddenly, the scene shifts in a courtroom where different characters are interrogated by an aggressive, anonymous 'voice'. We learn that the first act was actually a part of the play, and all the characters are basically working in a theatre group. Pramod is Jagannath Pathak, the leader of the theatre troupe. Kanta is Kamini Desai, the lead actress, Bhabhi is Swati Soni and Nandlal is Pritam Soni — a real life couple, Niranjan is Kamini's brother Sundar Desai, and the actor who speaks only one line as a cameo appearance in the first act is Keshav Thaker, the playwright of the troupe. The murder that happened at the end of the first act was real, and all the characters are interrogated to find out why Kamini killed Shekhar Khosla, the audience member in the first row. This act uses expository flashback techniques to show the intertwined relationships between the characters. But it also shows how all the characters are lying to the voice and actually played some role in the murder.

The third act features their individual testimonies where we realize that Kamini was abused by her lover Jagannath Pathak and her brother Sundar Desai. One realizes that Kamini created an imaginary myth of a man named Shekhar Khosla to terrorize everyone around her to gain some control and agency.

The fourth act reveals that it was actually the meek and gullible looking playwright Keshav Thaker who was manipulating and feeding Kamini with the stories of Shekhar Khosla, who used to bully him and abused his wife. Kamini's mental health deteriorates gradually and she starts believing the myth of Shekhar Khosla, and actually falls in love with the imaginary idea of Shekhar Khosla she had created in her head. It is to prove that myth to be real, Kamini commits murder and is finally put behind bars. The last scene shows Kamini who has lost her mind behind the bars. She is still thinking of Shekhar Khosla, and breaks down in the end. The play that began as a comedy, turned into a thriller, eventually ends as a tragedy.

== Reception ==
Hasmukh Baradi wrote that the play exhibits a fine mastery of structure, astute presentation of conflictual episodes and a keen sense for portraying characters. The potential to provoke thought was somewhat undermined however, in his view, by an excessive recourse to dramatics, a shortcoming which was counterbalanced by the play's formal technical virtues.

Uma Mahadevan-Dasgupta described the play as a murder mystery, one whose tangled secrets are gradually teased out by a combination of nimble-witted humour and viciousness exhibited in their interactions by the various members of a theatrical company.

The critic Jashvant Shekhdiwala judged the play to be one of the finest written over the past two decades. According to him, "the playwright's craftsmanship successfully created a complex play within a play, by the device of juxtaposing an inner and an outer stage with the drama in one setting offset by the other, where a court takes down evidence from the characters. The audience itself was placed in a position to participate as the presiding judge. The result was a dynamic flow of suspense, as mysteries emerge, riddles arise, concerns are raised and involvements of the protagonist dissected. All this is ably sustained until the curtain falls." The play was, in his view, one of the finest ever written for the Gujarati theatre.

The play played an instrumental role in spurring Mahesh Dattani's interest in theatre.

== Performance history ==
The play was first produced on stage by the Darpana Academy of Performing Arts in 1969. It was directed by Indian classical dancer Mrinalini Sarabhai. The English version was first performed on 18 July 1979 at Jawahar Bal Bhawan, Banglore by Banglore Little Theatre. In October 2014, the play was staged at Natrani, Ahmedabad. It was directed by Abhinay Banker, starring Hemang Dave, Ankit Gor and Banker among others. The Marathi version, Shekhar Khosla Kon Ahe, was staged at NCPA's Pratibimb Marathi Theatre Festival, directed by Vijay Kenkre. The English version was again performed by Manipal Centre for Philosophy and Humanities's Theatre Club on 23 March 2018, directed by Abhimanyu Acharya.

== Sources ==
- Baradi, Hasmukh (2003). History of Gujarati Theatre. India – The Land and the People. Translated by Meghani, Vinod. New Delhi: National Book Trust. ISBN 978-81-237-4032-4.
- Rye, Madhu (2007). Three Gujarati Plays by Madhu Rye. Translated by Padaki, Vijay. Gandhinagar: Gujarat Sahitya Academy. OCLC 170205341.
