= Holi (1984 film) =

- Poster
- Directed by: Ketan Mehta
- Written by: Ketan Mehta
- Screenplay by: Mahesh Elkunchwar
- Story by: Mahesh Elkunchwar (play)
- Produced by: Pradeep Uppoor
- Starring: Aamir Khan; Om Puri; Naseeruddin Shah; Ashutosh Gowariker; Raj Zutshi
- Cinematography: Jehangir Choudhary
- Edited by: Subhash Sehgal
- Music by: Rajat Dholakia
- Release date: 15 August 1984
- Running time: 120 minutes
- Country: India
- Language: Hindi

Holi is a 1984 Indian Hindi-language coming-of-age drama film directed by Ketan Mehta, whose socially conscious work has been compared to American director Spike Lee. It is based on eponymous play by Marathi writer, Mahesh Elkunchwar. The film starred Aamir Khan, Ashutosh Gowariker, Om Puri, Shreeram Lagoo, Deepti Naval, Meena Phatak and Naseeruddin Shah. The film also features Amol Gupte.

== Plot ==
In a typical college in a typical Indian city, the hostel boys Madan Sharma and his friends including Ranjeet Prakash are a rowdy and troublesome lot. But on one day, when Madan and his friends find out there will not be a holiday for them on the day of Holi, the festival of colors, the boys decide not to attend classes.

The hostel superintendent Professor Singh, the only lecturer having some links with the students, watches with apprehension their growing restlessness. A notice announcing a further postponement of examinations adds to the bitterness. A fight erupts out of nowhere between principal Pandey's nephew and another student; the principal's nephew is hurt, and the other boy is promptly rusticated. This is seen as a drastic punishment, and the news spreads like wildfire to all the students at the college. Resistance is organized in the library, in the laboratory, in the classrooms and the college grounds as the students rebel against the principal. The principal calls professor Singh to give up the names of the troublemakers but he refuses, the names are later given by one of the classmates and soon the boys are sent a suspension notice.

On their last day, the classmate is bullied and humiliated by the boys. The next day they find out that their classmate has committed suicide and the film ends with the boys being taken in a police van while people dance to Holi outside.

== Production ==
Holi was shot mainly on the campus of the Film and Television Institute of India (FTII), Pune and Fergusson College, Pune. The iconic Fergusson College banyan tree had just fallen and Ketan Mehta, who had studied at Fergusson College, improvised and picturized a song with the main characters on the tree singing about the falling of a symbolic 'system'. The editing, sound recording, and mixing were done at FTII. This film was a part of the student project. The FTII student participants credited in the movie include future cinematographers Anil Mehta and Piyush Shah, and filmmakers Rajan Khosa and Anant Balani.

The film includes several long takes using a hand-held camera, and many of these are one-shot takes, which called for added effort, particularly from the cast as well as from the director of photography, Jehangir Choudhary.

== Cast ==
As per the film's opening credits

- Naseeruddin Shah as Professor Singh (guest appearance)
- Om Puri as Principal Pandey (guest appearance)
- Shreeram Lagoo as SK Nanda (guest appearance)
- Deepti Naval as Professor Sehgal (guest appearance)
- Ashutosh Gowariker as Ranjeet Prakash
- Amole Gupte as Amol Khanna
- Aamir Khan as Madan Sharma (credited as Aamir Hussain)
- Neeraj Vora as Narendra
- Rajendranath Zutshi as Ajay
- Kitu Gidwani

== Reception ==
In 1985, Vincent Canby of The New York Times gave the film a generally favorable review, writing that the "film, which the production notes report was largely improvised, is very decently and exuberantly performed by the non-professional actors."

== Awards ==
- 1985: National Film Award for Best Cinematography: Jehangir Choudhary
