= Mohra (community development block) =

Community development block in Gaya district, Bihar, India

- Community Development Block
- Location within Bihar Location within India
- Coordinates: 24°52′50″N 85°14′25″E
- Country: India
- State: Bihar
- District: Gaya
- Subdivision: Neemchak Bathani

Area
  - Total: 143.3 km^{2} (55.3 sq mi)

Population (2011)
  - Total: 100,820
- Time zone: UTC+05:30 (IST)

Mohra is one of the 24 blocks of Gaya district in the Indian state of Bihar. It is part of Neemchak Bathani subdivision. The population was 100,820 at the 2011 Indian census.

== Geography ==
Mohra is located in the northeastern part of Gaya district, bounded by Atri block on the north and west, Neemchak Bathani block on the north, Nawada district on the southeast and Wazirganj Municipality on the south. It comprises a land area of 143.3 square kilometres (55.3 mi^{2}).

== Villages ==
According to the 2011 census, Mohra comprises 55 villages, of which 49 are inhabited:

- Abhaipur
- Aer
- Arai
- Baikatpur
- Basar
- Bela
- Bikaipur
- Chamardih
- Chandaila
- Chandpura
- Cheya
- Chhibra
- Dariyapur
- Ganokhar
- Gehlaur
- Gendupur
- Ghure Parsa
- Jagatpur
- Jalalpur
- Jithian
- Jota
- Kajur
- Karamchak
- Kasiadih
- Kharanti
- Kharaua
- Khetila
- Kishanpur
- Mad Bigha
- Mahammadpur
- Mahapur
- Mahuari
- Malti
- Mohanpur
- Naudiha
- Pachrukhi
- Padmaul
- Pakri
- Panditpur
- Puraini
- Raj Bigha
- Rampur
- Reula
- Sarsu
- Sauntar
- Shahpur
- Shahzadpur
- Sirabilaru
- Sirphala
- Sohari
- Sonra
- Surajpur
- Tetar
- Tetaru
- Thamh
