= Hero Hiralal =

- Poster
- Directed by: Ketan Mehta
- Screenplay by: Gul Anand; Ketan Mehta
- Produced by: Gul Anand
- Starring: Naseeruddin Shah; Sanjana Kapoor; Deepa Sahi; Kiran Kumar; Amitabh Bachchan
- Cinematography: Jehangir Choudhary
- Edited by: Sutanu Gupta
- Music by: Babla Shah
- Release date: 21 October 1988
- Country: India
- Language: Hindi

Hero Hiralal is a 1988 Indian Hindi language film directed by Ketan Mehta, starring Naseeruddin Shah and Sanjana Kapoor in leading roles. It is a movie about an auto rickshaw driver who falls in love with a film actress. The movie showcased performances by the lead actors and by Saeed Jaffrey and Satish Shah in their supporting roles.

The film was an adaptation of the one-act play Apghat Kare Chee (English adaptation by and as "Ashutosh Gowariker Commits Suicide") by Naushil Mehta.

== Plot ==
Hero Hiralal, a Hyderabadi auto-rickshaw driver who meets an upcoming Bollywood starlet, Roopa and becomes her tour guide. Soon, the two fall in love.

Work takes Roopa back to Bombay. Hero, pining for his lover, follows her and has an encounter with her family members, who clearly disapprove of him. Roopa's family tells her to reject Hero's love and move on with her career. Buckling under family pressure, Roopa is compelled to abandon her love, which causes Hero to fall into depression and attempt suicide. He is saved in time by Rani Sitara Devi, a show lady, who arranges for him to die like a great lover in supposedly the greatest show on earth as directed by her. Hero is saved once again in the nick of time when Roopa arrives in a rush at the last minute to confess her love for him.

== Cast ==
- Naseeruddin Shah as Hero Hiralal
- Sanjana Kapoor as Roopa
- Deepa Sahi as Rani Sitara Devi
- Kiran Kumar as Prem Kumar
- Saeed Jaffrey as Aziz
- Satish Shah as Bhagwan
- Rohini Hattangadi as Roopa's Stepmother
- Mohan Gokhale as Rangeela Paintal
- Johnny Lever as Police Constable
- Deepak Qazir as Dukhilal
- Ahmad Khan
- Rahul Chowdhary
- Hosi Vasunia
- Benjamin Gilani
- Amitabh Bachchan as Himself (Special appearance)

== Music ==
The film's music is by Babla Shah, with lyrics by Hriday Lani, and singing by Lata Mangeshkar, Amit Kumar, Kanchan, Mahendra Kapoor, Suresh Wadkar and Kumar Sanu.

1. "Main Hoon Hero Hiralal" – Amit Kumar
2. "Sapno Ki Duniya Hai" (Happy) – Kanchan
3. "Bigdi Humein Banani Hai" – Mahendra Kapoor, Suresh Wadkar and Anant
4. "Jashn Hai Mohabbat Ka" – Kumar Sanu
5. "Sapno Ki Duniya Hai" (Sad) – Lata Mangeshkar
6. "Bachke Kahan Jayega" – Kanchan and Amit Kumar
