= Wako Naam Fakir =

Song by A. R. Rahman

from the album The Fakir of Venice
- Released: January 6, 2019
- Studio: AM Studios (Chennai, India)
- Genre: World
- Length: 3:29
- Label: October Films
- Songwriter(s): A. R. Rahman

"Wako Naam Fakir" is a song from the soundtrack of the 2019 film The Fakir of Venice. It was composed by Indian musician A. R. Rahman.

== Background ==
A. R. Rahman says it was the director's idea to use the 15th-century Indian mystic poet Kabir's doha, "Had-Had Tape So Auliya", that made him greenlight the song. "Anand is an interesting filmmaker and I liked his ideas. Wako Naam Fakir is a soulful number. I have composed one track for the film as well," stated the singer-composer.

The song was composed and sung by Rahman. "Wako Naam Fakir" is a doha of Sant Kabir. The song gives us a glimpse of its central characters' journey in the film. The song was performed by Rahman, Arjun Chandy, Abhay Jodhpurkar.

== Reception ==
The song was well appreciated by netizens with The Times of India labelling it as "soothing".

== Personnel ==
- Guitars: Keba Jeremiah
- Cello: Irina Solinas
- Additional programming: Jerry Vincent, Ishaan Chhabra.
- Sound engineers: Panchathan Record Inn, Chennai Suresh Permal, Karthik Sekaran
- AR Studios Mumbai
- Dilshaad Shaikh, R Nitish Kumar
- AM Studios, Chennai S.Sivakumar, Pradeep Menon, Kannan Ganpat, Krishnan Subramanian, Manoj Rama
- Mixing: Jerry Vincent
- Mastering: Suresh Permal MFiT : S Sivakumar
- Musician co-ordinators: Noell James, TM Faizuddin, Abdul Haiyum, Siddique
- Musician fixer: R Samidurai
- Video editor: Saheb Bagchi Wako Naam Fakir
