= The Fakir of Venice =

2009 Indian film by Anand Surapur

- Directed by: Anand Surapur
- Screenplay by: Rajesh Devraj
- Story by: Homi Adajania
- Produced by: Punit Desai; Anand Surapur
- Starring: Farhan Akhtar; Annu Kapoor; Kamal Sidhu
- Cinematography: Deepti Gupta; Preetha Jayaraman; Bakul Sharma
- Edited by: Bunty Nagi
- Music by: A. R. Rahman
- Production companies: October Films; Phat Phish Motion Pictures
- Distributed by: Phat Phish Motion Pictures
- Release dates: April 2009 (Indian Film Festival of Los Angeles); 8 February 2019
- Running time: 98 minutes
- Country: India
- Language: Hindi
- Box office: est. ₹0.20 crore

The Fakir of Venice is a 2009 Hindi-language comedy drama film directed by Anand Surapur and written by Rajesh Devraj, from a story by Homi Adajania. The film stars Farhan Akhtar, Annu Kapoor and Kamal Sidhu in the lead roles. It was presented as Opening Night Film in April 2009 at the Indian Film Festival of Los Angeles.

It was released on 8 February 2019, 10 years after its premiere. The film's release was halted for ten years due to production related issues and was Akhtar's first acting role. The music is composed by A. R. Rahman.

== Cast ==
- Farhan Akhtar as Adi Contractor
- Annu Kapoor as Sattar
- Kamal Sidhu as Mandira
- Valentina Carnelutti as Gia
- Mathieu Carrière as Massimo

== Music ==
Songs and the background score for the film were composed by A. R. Rahman.

The Fakir of Venice

Soundtrack album by A. R. Rahman
- Genre: Feature film soundtrack
- Language: Hindi
- Label: October Films
- Producer: A. R. Rahman

Tracklist
No.	Title	Lyrics	Singer(s)	Length
1.	"Wako Naam Fakir"	Sant Kabir	A. R. Rahman, Arjun Chandy & Abhay Jodhpurkar	03:28
2.	"Fakir"	Sant Kabir	Shreya Ghoshal	04:01

== Marketing and release ==
The official trailer of the film was launched on 2 January 2019.

=== Release ===
The film was initially scheduled to be released on 1 February 2019. The film was released on 8 February 2019.

== Reception ==
=== Critical response ===
The film received mixed reviews. Isha Arora of TIMC giving seven stars out of ten to the film said, "Surapur's directorial is a well-thought and shot movie and the brilliant performances by the two lead actors will win everyone's heart. We wish that The Fakir of Venice could have been released on the silver screen, much sooner but it's definitely worth a watch." Reza Noorani of The Times of India rates the film two and half out of five stars and writes "While the first half meanders and stretches on, it is in the second half when the film finds its groove. At 1 hour and 38 minutes, the film still feels a bit long. Had the makers worked on the screenplay and made it a tad more complex, it would have been a great film on how, people from different classes, connect with each other and posed bigger questions on mortality and the nature of death. But it falls short of that and ends up being a weak, sideshow at some European art fair."
