= Toba Tek Singh (film) =

- Directed by: Ketan Mehta
- Written by: Ketan Mehta; Udit Chandrau
- Screenplay by: Ketan Mehta
- Story by: Saadat Hasan Manto
- Based on: Tob Tek Singh by Saadat Hasan Manto
- Produced by: Shailja Kejriwal; Deepa Sahi
- Starring: Pankaj Kapur; Vinay Pathak
- Cinematography: Raktim Mondal
- Edited by: Udit Chandraul; Shailesh Gupta
- Music by: Anurag Saikia
- Production company: Maya Movies
- Distributed by: ZEE5
- Release date: 24 August 2018
- Running time: 73 minutes
- Country: India
- Language: Hindi

Toba Tek Singh is an Indian film based on Saadat Hassan Manto's short story of the same name. The short film is written and directed by Ketan Mehta and produced by Shailja Kejriwal. It stars Pankaj Kapoor and Vinay Pathak. It was released on ZEE5 on 24 August 2018.

== Plot ==
The story takes place just before the India-Pakistan partition in one of the oldest mental asylums in undivided India. Situated in Lahore, it was home to Hindu, Muslim and Sikh patients who were left behind by their uncaring families. Friendships were thick between the patients who had nobody but each other for company. Each had a story that made for an interesting tale but none quite like Bishan Singh. The story of his journey from sanity to madness stemmed from the village he came from, Toba Tek Singh. Now all he does is stay awake every day and night and such has been the case for the last 10 years. But what happens when partition causes him to leave the country he has known to be home in his sane and insane state of mind? It is a story of displacement and how painful it is even for the people who are not in their senses in a worldly way. Irrespective of who you were and what state of mind you were in, partition had nothing but pain for people who experienced it and this is what this film based on the poignant tale by celebrated writer Saadat Hasan Manto, examines.

== Cast ==
- Pankaj Kapur as Bishan Singh/Toba Tek Singh
- Vinay Pathak as Saadat Hasan Manto
- Chirag Vohra as Roshan Lal; Hindu Vakil
- Gaurav Dwivedi as Surajmal
- Nand Kishore Pant as Hamid
- Ajay Kumar as Ittefaq Ali
- Vijai Singh as Zoravar Singh
- Vishwa Bhanu as Mansur Ahmed
- Malkiat Rouni as Tara Singh
- Daljit Singh as Mohammed Ali
- Sheikh Noor Islam
- Gilles Chuyen as Superintendent
- Swami Sarabjeet as Fazaluddin
- Navjot Kaur as Roop Kaur
