= Oh Darling! Yeh Hai India! =

1995 Indian film by Ketan Mehta

Oh Darling! Yeh Hai India
- Theatrical poster
- Directed by: Ketan Mehta
- Screenplay by: Parvati Balagopalan; Deepa Sahi
- Story by: Ketan Mehta
- Produced by: Ketan Mehta
- Starring: Shah Rukh Khan; Deepa Sahi; Javed Jaffrey; Anupam Kher; Amrish Puri; Sanjay Mishra
- Cinematography: W.B. Rao
- Edited by: Jeethu Mundal
- Music by: Ranjit Barot
- Distributed by: Ketan Mehta Productions
- Release date: 11 August 1995
- Running time: 157 minutes
- Language: Hindi
- Budget: ₹2.25 crore

Oh Darling Yeh Hai India (transl. Oh darling, this is India) is a 1995 Indian musical parody film directed by Ketan Mehta, starring Shah Rukh Khan, Deepa Sahi, Jaaved Jaffrey and Amrish Puri. It also stars Anupam Kher in a supporting role.

== Plot ==
Don Quixote (Amrish Puri) is a don who plans to sell India in a widely publicised auction. His plan is simple — kidnap the president, replace him with a lookalike (both Anupam Kher), throw a scare, and "force" the fake president to sell India. Hero (Shah Rukh Khan) is new to Bombay and broke. Miss India (Deepa Sahi) is busy living it up the night she meets Hero. They meet and decide to spend the night entertaining each other in any way possible.

Meanwhile, Don Quixote's son Prince (Javed Jaffrey) has set his eyes on Miss India, who shows no interest in him. The night turns out to be an adventurous one for Hero and Miss India. Hero discovers that Miss India's father is a drunkard who wants her to enter prostitution, while Miss India discovers that Hero has a brain tumor. When they find out Quixote's plans, they decide to save the president.

Quixote is killed in some riots and Prince takes his throne. Prince decides to continue his father's plan. Hero and Miss India, in disguise, manage to enter the auditorium where the auction is taking place. Prince, in his father's don attires, suddenly makes an entry with his henchmen. Hero, Miss India, and their friends successfully overpower the cronies. Some people previously rescued by Hero and Miss India kill the fake president, pushing a hose in his mouth, causing his stomach to inflate and explode. When Prince attacks Hero and Miss India, causing all three of them to smash the glass and fall out of the building, Hero and Miss India create a parachute from an Indian Flag, taken from Prince's body. During the jump, Prince falls to his death. Hero and Miss India land on the roof of a double-decker bus, and Hero declares that he is glad to be alive. When Miss India reminds him that he has a brain tumor, Hero tells her that the X-ray she saw was taken a year and a half ago.

== Cast ==
- Shah Rukh Khan as Hero
- Deepa Sahi as Miss India
- Amrish Puri as Don Quixote
- Jaaved Jaffrey as Prince of Don
- Anupam Kher as S. D. Sharma / Nathuram (dual role)
- Sadashiv Amrapurkar as Bidder Shyamu
- Kader Khan as Bidder Kamlesh Singh
- Paresh Rawal as Bidder Sagar Srivastav
- Raza Murad as Bidder Vikram
- Anil Nagrath as Bidder Prithvi
- Ashish Vidyarthi as Arora
- Ranjeet as Bidder Khokha
- Tiku Talsania as Havaldar Gaitonde
- Shrivallabh Vyas as Dharma
- Tom Alter as Bidder Karan
- Tinnu Anand Saifuddin
- Sanjay Mishra as Manilal Shastri
- Geeta Kapoor as herself
- Rajesh Jais Aman Pratap Ahuja
- Ravi Jhankal Insp Jadhav
- Ahmed Khan AK Malhotra
- Prashant Narayanan as Dhanajay

== Production ==
Shah Rukh Khan signed the film, which was supposed to finish shoot in 33 days. The film, however, took 155 days.

== Soundtrack ==
#	Title	Singer(s)
1	"Tujh Pe Marta Hoon"	Ranjit Barot, Alisha Chinai
2	"Par Mila"	Shankar Mahadevan
3	"Aaja Aaja"	Hema Sardesai, Antara Choudhary, Nusrat Fateh Ali Khan
4	"Raat Hai Qayamat"	Shweta Shetty
5	"Khullam Khulla"	Shankar Mahadevan, Hema Sardesai
6	"Choo Le Ne De"	Shankar Mahadevan, Hema Sardesai
7	"Oh Darling Yeh Hai India"	Shankar Mahadevan, Hema Sardesai, Raghuveer Yadav
8	"Main Hoon Kaun"	Vinod Rathod
9	"Public Ko Hasao"	Shankar Mahadevan, Sudesh Bhosle
10	"Baap Re Baap"	Javed Jaffrey, Shankar Mahadevan
11	"Pyar Bechti Hoon"	Hema Sardesai
