= Hum (film) =

1991 Indian film by Mukul S. Anand

- Theatrical release poster
- Directed by: Mukul S. Anand
- Screenplay by: Ravi Kapoor; Mohan Kaul
- Story by: Ravi Kapoor; Mohan Kaul; Kader Khan (dialogues)
- Produced by: Romesh Sharma
- Starring: Amitabh Bachchan; Rajinikanth; Govinda; Kimi Katkar; Deepa Sahi; Shilpa Shirodkar; Danny Denzongpa; Anupam Kher; Kader Khan
- Cinematography: W. B. Rao
- Edited by: Kuldeep Mehan; K. Ravi Kumar
- Music by: Songs: Laxmikant–Pyarelal; Score: Louis Banks; Sunil Kaushik
- Release date: 1 February 1991
- Running time: 178 minutes
- Country: India
- Language: Hindi

Hum (transl. We/Us) is a 1991 Indian Hindi-language action film directed by Mukul S. Anand. Produced by Romesh Sharma, it stars an ensemble cast of Amitabh Bachchan, Rajinikanth, Govinda, Kimi Katkar, Deepa Sahi, Shilpa Shirodkar, Danny Denzongpa, Anupam Kher and Kader Khan. At the 37th Filmfare Awards, the film received 7 nominations and won 4 awards including Best Actor for Bachchan and Best Choreographer for Chinni Prakash for the song "Jumma Chumma De De". The film was a blockbuster and the second highest-grossing Indian film at the box office. The film was an inspiration for the 1995 Tamil film Baashha.

== Plot ==
In 1975, Bhaktawar rules over the docks in Mumbai, treating his workers like slaves. Despite his general dissatisfaction with this regime, Tiger extorts money from the dock workers for his father Pratap, who in turn works as an enforcer for Bhaktawar. Tiger is in love with Jumma, the sister of his best friend Gonsalves. Gonsalves is against Bhaktawar's policies and is killed by Bhaktawar and in the subsequent fallout, Tiger's father and stepmother also die, leaving his two young half-brothers, Kumar and Vijay, with Tiger.

An enraged Tiger immediately sets out to kill Bhaktawar but is stopped by Inspector Girdhar. He reminds Tiger to fulfil his dying stepmother's wish and take care of his brothers while leaving the police to deal with Bhaktawar. Girdhar and his faithful sidekick Havaldar Arjun Singh steal money from Bhaktawar's safe and set fire to Bhaktawar's house to destroy any evidence, murdering Bhaktawar's wife and his daughter. Police later arrest Bhaktawar for killing Tiger's family and sends him to jail. Tiger escapes in a train and Jumma refuses to leave with Tiger, as his brothers should be his priority. Jumma and Tiger promise to reunite in the future. Girdhar bombs the train carrying Tiger and his younger brothers to eliminate any possible witnesses of his crime, but they escape luckily.

16 years later, in 1991, Tiger has renamed himself Shekhar and is a respectable farmer and timber merchant in Ooty. Kumar is a police officer married to Aarti, and they have a young daughter Jyoti (Sanjana). The youngest brother, Vijay, is a college student. Vijay is in love with Anita, daughter of General Rana Pratap Singh, who wants his daughter to marry a military officer. Shekhar and his brothers lead a happy family life. Neither of the two youngest brothers seems to have any memory of their time in Mumbai and both regard Shekhar as their elder brother. Jumma is now a successful actress, while Girdhar and Havaldar are leading a luxurious life off the money they stole from Bhaktawar.

Bhaktawar is released from jail and is manipulated by Giridhar into believing that Tiger killed Bhaktawar's family. To seek revenge, Bhaktawar tracks down Tiger in Ooty. He kidnaps Aarti and Jyothi in Bangalore and tells them the truth about Shekhar. Meanwhile, Kumar also learns his brother Shekhar's true identity and blames him for his wife and child's kidnapping. However, all misunderstandings are cleared by Jumma when she explains Vijay and Kumar about their past and the sacrifices made by Shekhar for them to lead a respectable life. Later Tiger, along with Kumar and Vijay, rescue Aarti and Jyoti and explain to Bhaktawar that it was Giridhar who had murdered his family. Bhaktawar then ties himself along with Giridhar to a bomb and they both die due to the explosion. The film ends with the family happily united.

== Cast ==
- Amitabh Bachchan as Shekhar Malhotra / Tiger
- Rajinikanth as Inspector Kumar Malhotra
- Govinda as Vijay Malhotra
- Kimi Katkar as Jumalina Gonsalves 'Jumma'
- Deepa Sahi as Aarti Malhotra (Kumar's wife)
- Shilpa Shirodkar as Anita Sinha
- Baby Sanjana as Jyoti Malhotra (Kumar's Daughter)
- Danny Denzongpa as Bhaktavar/S.V.Bhagwat
- Anupam Kher as Inspector Girdhar
- Kader Khan as General Rana Pratap Sinha / Chittor
- Romesh Sharma as Gonsalves (Tiger's Friend / Jumma's Brother)
- Annu Kapoor as Havaldar Arjun Singh
- Deepak Shirke as Pratap (Tiger's Father)
- Shiva Rindani as Captain Zatach (Captain Attack)
- Guddi Maruti as Tomatoes Seller
- Viju Khote as a College Principal
- Shammi as Aarti's Mother
- Asha Sharma as Tiger's Stepmother

== Production ==
Despite starring the likes of Rajinikanth and Govinda, the film was described as a "Bachchan vehicle". Hum was shot in various locations including Mumbai, Ooty, and Mauritius. Deepa Sahi's first scene involved a one-and-half page dialogue with Kader Khan. The scene was completed in one take and Sahi felt that her experienced costars were very supportive. A scene in which Sahi's character had to be save by Rajinikanth's character was performed by a body double since Rajinikanth didn't know how to swim.

In 1990 at Wembley stadium London, Amitabh Bachchan performed and danced to the song "Jumma Chumma De De" with Sridevi even before the film and song were released.

== Soundtrack ==
Hum

Soundtrack album by Laxmikant–Pyarelal
- Released: 25 January 1991
- Recorded: 1990
- Genres: Film soundtrack, Bollywood music
- Length: 34:41
- Language: Hindi
- Label: Saregama

The soundtrack was composed by Laxmikant–Pyarelal. Two songs were inspired by Guinean singer Mory Kanté's 1987 album Akwaba Beach, with "Jumma Chumma De De" being based on Kante's "Tama" and "Yé ké yé ké", while "Ek Doosre Se" was based on Kanté's "Inch Allah". Kanté's "Tama" and "Yé ké yé ké" had earlier been interpolated for the hit song "Tamma Tamma Loge", by Anuradha Paudwal and Bappi Lahiri, for the 1990 film Thanedaar.

Lyrics are written by Anand Bakshi.

The film's soundtrack album sold 3 million units. However, the music rights were sold for only ₹30 lakh ($132,000).

No.	Title	Singer(s)	Length
1.	"Ek Doosre Se Karte Hain Pyaar Hum"	Alka Yagnik, Udit Narayan, Mohammad Aziz, Sudesh Bhosle, Sonali Vajpayee	04:43
2.	"General Sahab Karo Tayari"	Alka Yagnik, Sudesh Bhonsle, Vinay Mandke	03:03
3.	"Is Pyaar Ki Hum Pehchan Denge"	Alka Yagnik, Mohammad Aziz, Sudesh Bhonsle, Vinay Mandke	02:17
4.	"Jumma Chumma De De"	Kavita Krishnamurthy, Sudesh Bhonsle	08:25
5.	"Kagaz Kalam Davaat"	Mohammad Aziz, Shobha Joshi	05:59
6.	"Le Le Chumma Le Le"	Kavita Krishnamurthy	03:37
7.	"Sanam Mere Sanam"	Amit Kumar, Alka Yagnik	06:36
Total length:			34:40

== Reception ==
N. Krishnaswamy of The Indian Express wrote that "‘Hum’ is a formula film of vendetta that tries to renew itself with a lush visual feel and expansiveness, which qualities to give some credibility to the rhetoric of poor against rich and the oppressed against tyranny that the film bandies".

== Box office ==
The film grossed ₹16.75 crore (equivalent to ₹144 crore or US$15 million in 2023) in India, including a net income of ₹9.25 crore. It was the year's second highest-grossing Indian film at the box office. The film was later dubbed and released in Tamil and was also successful.

== Accolades ==
Award	Category	Recipients and nominees	Results
Filmfare Awards	Best Actor	Amitabh Bachchan	Won
Filmfare Awards	Best Choreographer	Chinni Prakash for "Jumma Chumma De De"	Won
Filmfare Awards	Best Art Director	R. Verman Shetty	Won
Filmfare Awards	Best Supporting Actress	Deepa Sahi	Nominated
Filmfare Awards	Best Comedian	Kader Khan	Nominated
Filmfare Awards	Best Villain	Danny Denzongpa	Nominated
Filmfare Awards	Best Male Playback Singer	Sudesh Bhosle for "Jumma Chumma De De"	Nominated

== Legacy ==
Rajinikanth had considered and discussed a potential scene for this film with Mukul S. Anand, where Amitabh Bachchan's character would help Govinda get a seat in the Police Academy. Anand discarded the scene, because he did not find it suitable. However, Rajinikanth felt the scene had the potential to develop into a script for a possible feature film, which resulted into the 1995 Tamil film Baashha.

== Bibliography ==
- Ramachandran, Naman (2014) [2012]. Rajinikanth: The Definitive Biography. Penguin Books. ISBN 978-81-8475-796-5.
