= Aar Ya Paar =

- Poster
- Directed by: Ketan Mehta
- Written by: Ketan Mehta
- Starring: Jackie Shroff; Deepa Sahi; Ritu Shivpuri; Kamal Sidhu; Paresh Rawal
- Cinematography: Dharam Gulati
- Edited by: Aseem Sinha
- Music by: Viju Shah
- Release date: 31 January 1997
- Running time: 180 minutes
- Country: India
- Language: Hindi

Aar Ya Paar (English: Now or never) is a 1997 Bollywood mystery crime thriller film produced and directed by Ketan Mehta. It stars Jackie Shroff, Deepa Sahi, Ritu Shivpuri, Kamal Sidhu and Paresh Rawal. The music is by Viju Shah. The movie is adapted from Agatha Christie's 1967 novel Endless Night and James Hadley Chase's 1954 novel The Sucker Punch and was partly shot in Italy.

== Story ==
Shekhar Khosla (Jackie Shroff) is an accounts executive, an alcoholic and a penniless playboy. He has an on-and-off romance with cabaret dancer Julie (Ritu Shivpuri).

One day his boss tells him to improve himself and hands him a multi-million rupee client, Veena Sanghvi (Kamal Sidhu) and asks him to maintain and strengthen the relationship with this client. Shekhar meets with Veena, seduces her and marries her, while having an affair with her personal secretary, Anu Chauhan (Deepa Sahi). When Veena finds out about this affair, she threatens to separate from him. Shekhar doesn't know about the will. Then Shekhar and Anu plan to kill her. They carry out their plan successfully, with the police concluding that her death was accidental. Shekhar finds out that Anu does not love him. To make matters worse, the police have evidence linking him to the death of his wife.

== Cast ==
- Jackie Shroff as Shekhar Khosla
- Deepa Sahi as Anu Chauhan
- Ritu Shivpuri as Julie
- Kamal Sidhu as Veena Sanghvi
- Paresh Rawal as Inspector Khan
- Satish Shah as Jagdish
- Harish Patel as Gupta
- Ajit Vachani as Salim
- Mamik Singh as Anil (Anu's Boyfriend)
- Ravi Khanvilkar as Hargovind
- Hunter Hearst Helmsley as Gigilo
- Doink the Clown as Joker
- Yokozuna as himself
- Bret Hart as himself
- Savio Vega as himself
- Chris Candido as himself
- Owen Hart as himself
- Diesel as himself

== Soundtrack ==
Aar Ya Paar

Soundtrack album by Viju Shah
- Genre: Feature film soundtrack
- Label: Venus Records & Tapes

The music was composed by Viju Shah. The lyrics were penned by Indeevar, Maya Govind, Nitin Raikwar and Rani Malik. The soundtrack was released on Venus Records & Tapes Pvt. Ltd.

Song	Singer
"Aar Ya Paar"	Asha Bhosle
"Dil Diya"	Asha Bhosle, Sudesh Bhosle
"Aar Ya Paar"	Jolly Mukherjee
"Hulle Hulle"	Udit Narayan, Hema Sardesai
"Manchahe Sanam"	Abhijeet, Sadhana Sargam
"Suna Hai Phool"	Kumar Sanu, Kavita Krishnamurthy
"Tumma Elle"	Shankar Mahadevan
"Jo Hoga Hone Do"	Jolly Mukherjee, Babul Supriyo, Hema Sardesai, Jaspinder Narula, Nayan Rathod, Sonali Vajpayee
