= Aghaat =

1985 film

Aaghat
- Film poster
- Directed by: Govind Nihalani
- Written by: Vijay Tendulkar
- Produced by: Manmohan Shetty
- Starring: Naseeruddin Shah; Om Puri; Bharath Gopi
- Cinematography: Govind Nihalani
- Edited by: Sutanu Gupta
- Music by: Vanraj Bhatia; Ajit Varman
- Production company: Neo Films Association
- Release date: 1985
- Country: India
- Language: Hindi

Aghaat (English: Aggression, Assault, or Attack) is a 1985 Indian Bollywood Hindi language film directed by Govind Nihalani and produced by Manmohan Shetty under the banner of Neo Films Association. It stars Om Puri, Naseeruddin Shah and Bharath Gopi in lead roles while Amrish Puri, Pankaj Kapur, K. K. Raina and Deepa Sahi and Sarika are in supporting roles. The film was written by Vijay Tendulkar, who also worked on the screenplay and dialogues alongside Vasant Dev.

== Plot ==
Madhav Verma is a dedicated, honest, and diligent union representative. He represents the majority of the employees in an organization, which recognizes his union. However, there is a rival in Rustom Patel who is attempting to break the union so as to establish his majority, through his henchman Krishnan, and will not hesitate to stoop to any level to get what he wants. Chhotelal loses his legs in an industrial accident and must be hospitalized. Krishnan takes advantage of the situation and puts pressure on Chhotelal and his brothers (Achyut Potdar and Harish Patel) to enroll in his union, and he will get him a higher compensation package than his regular union.

== Cast ==
- Bharath Gopi as Krishnan Raju
- Om Puri as Madhav Verma
- Sadashiv Amrapurkar as VP Sarnaik
- K K Raina as Paranjpe
- M K Raina as Dubey
- Rohini Hattangadi as Mrs. Ali, Social Worker
- Pankaj Kapur as Chotelal
- Naseeruddin Shah as Rustom Patel
- Deepa Sahi as Chotelal's wife
- Amrish Puri as Chakradev
- Harish Patel as Chotelal brother
- Achyut Potdar as Chotelal's elder brother
- Ravi Jhankal as Raghu

== Trivia ==
Nearly four decades after its release, Aghaat received a 4K restoration by the NFDC–National Film Archive of India. The restored film was screened in 2023 at the Jio MAMI Mumbai Film Festival as part of a retrospective celebrating Bharath Gopy.
