= Jalalpur, Muhra =

Village in Bihar, India

Jalalpur
- Village
- Country: India
- State: Bihar
- District: Gaya
- Block: Muhra

Population (2011)
  - Total: 1,555
- Time zone: UTC+05:30 (IST)

Jalalpur is a village in Muhra block of Gaya district, Bihar, India. It is 2–3 kilometres (1.2–1.9 mi) from Wazirganj (Gaya - Nawada Road), a city and block also in Gaya district. The population was 1,555 at the 2011 Indian census.
