= Deepa Sahi =

Indian actress and producer

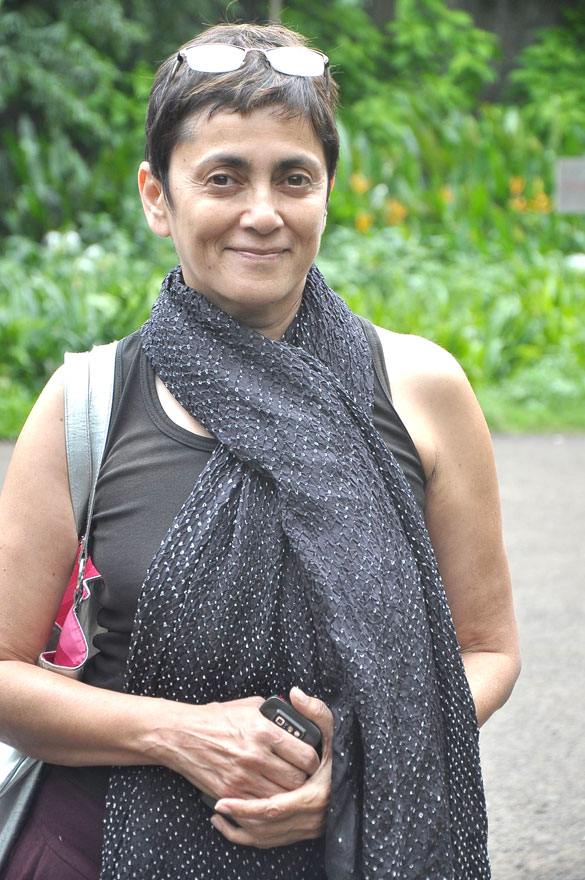
- Sahi at the launch of Maya Studio
- Born: 30 November 1962 (age 63); Dehradun, Uttarakhand, India
- Occupations: actress, Producer, director, script and story writer
- Years active: 1984–present
- Spouse: Ketan Mehta

Deepa Sahi is an Indian actress and producer, best known for her role as Maya in the 1993 movie Maya Memsaab, opposite actor Farooq Sheikh. She made her directorial debut with the movie Tere Mere Phere in 2011.

== Early and personal life ==
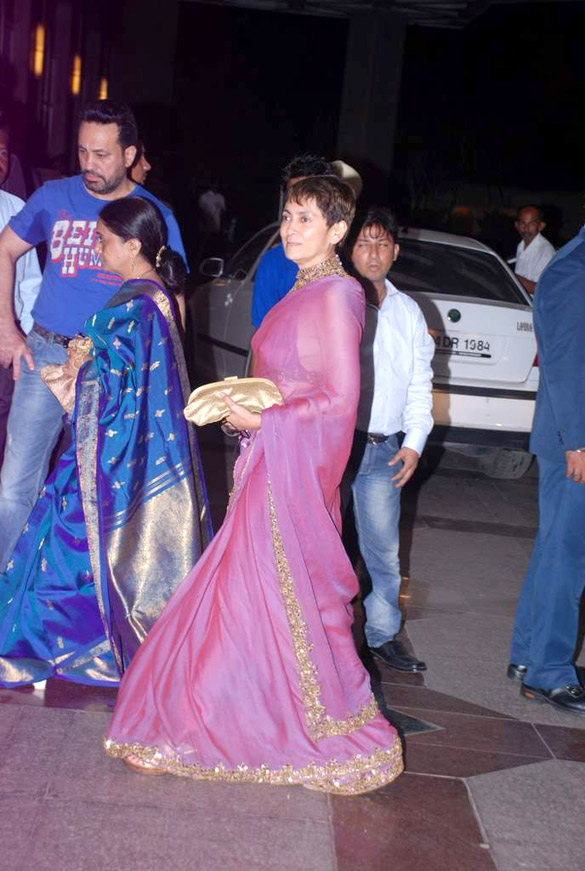
Sahi at Esha Deol's sangeet ceremony

Deepa Sahi, an ethnic Punjabi, was born in Dehradun in an Army background and is the youngest sibling in her family. She grew up in Meerut. Her family later shifted to Canada, but she continued to stay in India. She had an elder sister who died at the age of 18. Sahi pursued her education at Indraprastha College for Women, and was a gold medalist in Sociology from Delhi School of Economics. Sahi later joined the NSD with the aim of becoming a director. However, she started receiving acting offers from her NSD days, which prompted her to shift to acting. Sahi decided to direct her first film in the early days of her career but the film, Nana Karte Pyaar which was supposed to star Nana Patekar and Hema Malini failed to take off due to a recession. She is married to film director Ketan Mehta, who is the nephew of freedom fighter Usha Mehta. It is the second marriage for both of them. Her cousins Meena and Tana are theatre actresses active in Delhi's theatre circuit.

== Early career ==
An alumnus of NSD, Delhi, Sahi started off with a theater career, with strong social activism a core value of the productions she was involved with.

In her early film career she collaborated with noted auteur Govind Nihalani and made her debut with the 1984 film Party. This was well received, and she subsequently acted in Aghaat (1985). She is most noted for her role as a lower-caste Punjabi woman in the television film Tamas (1986).

=== Commercial cinema ===
After marrying film director Ketan Mehta, she acted in several of his films including Hero Hiralal (1988), Maya Memsaab (1992) and Oh Darling! Yeh Hai India! (1995). She wrote the screenplay for Oh Darling! Yeh Hai India!. Maya Memsaab was controversial for featuring an explicit sex scene between Sahi and then upcoming actor Shah Rukh Khan. Her other notable films include Hum (1991), Trinetra (1991) and Ek Doctor Ki Maut (1991).

Her last film appearances was in her husband's film Aar Ya Paar (1998) She got a Filmfare best supporting actress nomination for Hum and National Award (Jury) for Maya Memsaab.

In 2015, she returned to acting after 18 years appearing in her husband's film Manjhi – The Mountain Man in a cameo role as Indira Gandhi.

=== Production career ===
She became a producer in 1993. She has produced seven films to date:

Year	Title
1993	Maya Memsaab
1995	O Darling Yeh Hai India
1997	Aar Ya Paar
2003	Rules: Pyaar Ka Super Hit Formula
2005	Mangal Pandey
2014	Rang Rasiya
2015	Manjhi - The Mountain Man

Besides this, she has produced 12 TV series and is promoter of Maya Entertainment Pvt. Ltd. one of India's leading animation studios. She was the CEO of Maya Entertainment from 2000 to 2002 and was responsible for the long-term strategy of the company; she made many entries into other animation avenues such as MAAC, etc. After her stint as the CEO of Maya Entertainment, she returned to her first love cinema. She made her directorial debut with the 2011 film Tere Mere Phere. Together with Ketan Mehta, she co-founded an animation company, Cosmos-Maya.

== Filmography ==
Year	Title	Role	Notes
1984	Party	Sona Rane	
1985	Aghaat	Chotelal's wife	
1985	Aar Paar		
1986	Tamas	Karmo	
1988	Hero Hiralal	Rani Sitara Devi	
1990	Dushman	Geeta	
1991	Trinetra	Seema	
1991	Ek Doctor Ki Maut		
1991	Hum	Aarti Malhotra	
1992	Siasat		
1992	Maya Memsaab	Maya Das	
1993	Bhookamp	Mrs. Pooja Satyajeet Anand	
1995	Oh Darling! Yeh Hai India!	Miss India	As screenwriter
1995	Daughters of This Century	Champia	
1997	Aar Ya Paar	Anu Chauhan	
2005	Mangal Pandey: The Rising		As a producer
2011	Tere Mere Phere		As the director
2015	Manjhi – The Mountain Man	Indira Gandhi	
2018	Toba Tek Singh		As a producer
