= Gehlaur =

Gehlaur गहलौर
- village
- Location in Bihar, India Gehlaur (India)
- Coordinates: 24°52′50″N 85°14′25″E
- Country: India
- State: Bihar
- District: Gaya district

Languages
  - Official: Hindi
- Time zone: UTC+5:30 (IST)
- PIN: 824231
- ISO 3166 code: IN-BR
- Nearest city: Gaya

Gehlaur (Hindi: गहलौर) is a village located in Muhra Tehsil of Gaya district in Bihar State, India.

== Notability ==
Gehlaur was the home of the legendary ‘Mountain Man’ Dashrath Manjhi. He was a poor man who worked as a labourer in Gehlaur village. He carved a path through a mountain in the Gehlaur Hills using only a hammer and chisel as his tools because his village did not have easy access to a hospital. The nearest town which could offer a good doctor and required medical attention was 70 km away traveling around the hills. He started carving the path in 1960 after his wife Falguni Devi died from lack of medical care.

After 22 years of work, Dashrath shortened the distance between the Atri and Wazirganj blocks of Gaya town from 55 km to 15 km, cutting a 360-ft-long and 25-ft-wide road through a hill to link Ghivra Mauja of Dashrath Nagar, in Gehlaur Ghati, to Atara Prakhand, Wazirganj. After he died, Dashrath Manjhi was given due respect and a state funeral by the Government of Bihar.
