= Chasing Nature =

Reality television series

Chasing Nature is a reality television series on Animal Planet. On the show, teams of engineering students compete to create devices that simulate the abilities of animals. Episodes include simulating bat sonar and a bird's talon. It premiered in December 2005. Self-driving car engineer Anthony Levandowski competed in an episode. The show, filmed in Australia, was described in The Boston Globe as "Survivor for really, really, smart people".
