= Ketan Mehta =

Indian film director (born 1952)

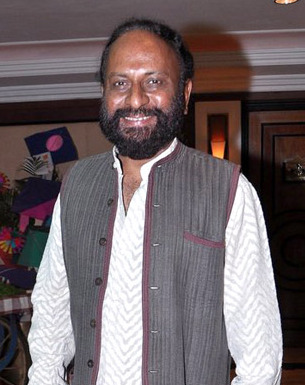
- Born: 21 July 1952 (age 74); Navsari, Bombay State (present day Gujarat), India
- Occupations: Film director; Producer; Screenwriter
- Years active: 1975–present
- Spouse: Deepa Sahi
- Relatives: Usha Mehta (aunt)
- Website: https://cosmos-maya.com/

Ketan Mehta (born 21 July 1952) is an Indian film director, producer and screenwriter who has also directed documentaries and television serials since 1975.

== Early life and education ==
Born on 21 July 1952 in Navsari in Gujarat, Mehta did his schooling from Sardar Patel Vidyalaya, Delhi and later graduated in film direction from Film and Television Institute of India, Pune.

== Career ==
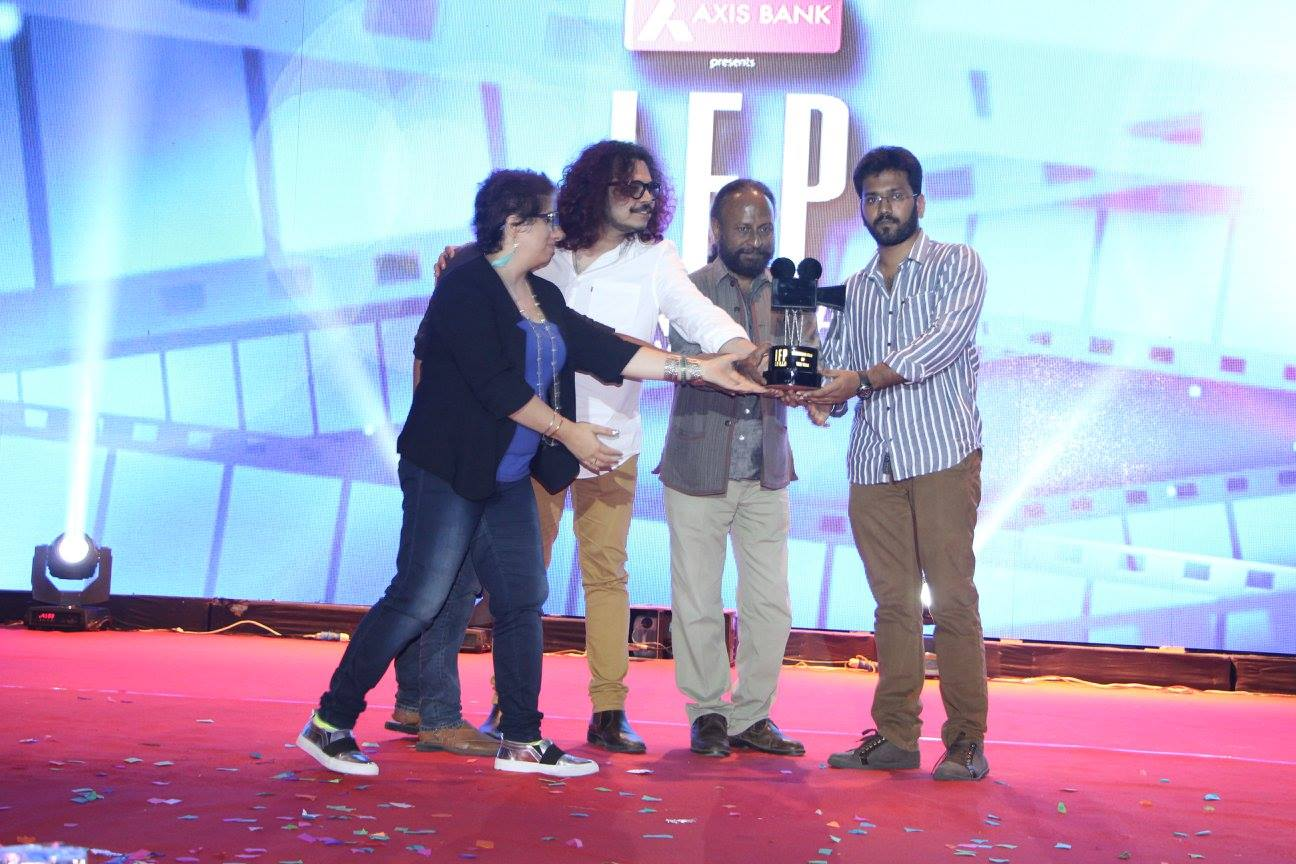
Mehta with Raja Sen and Guneet Monga handing over the award to Vijay Vellukutty at IFP Awards, 2015

During his career, Mehta has made ten feature films, seven documentaries and two television serials – Captain Vyom and Mr. Yogi. His repertoire of themes includes comedy, satire, romance, violence and rebellion.

After graduating from the Film and Television Institute of India, Mehta joined the Indian Space Research Organisation as a television producer. There, he was given almost total freedom in what to create. In an interview years later, Mehta remarked about how influential this was to his development: "It was an incredible experience. Traveling all over Gujarat, meeting people, making programs on whatever you felt like, whatever you came across. It was real, genuine experimentation with medium, with people. That experience has been vital to films that I've made."

Mehta's first film, Bhavni Bhavai, a Gujarati film, won him acclaim. His films have been selected for various international film festivals such as Nantes (France) and the Moscow Film Festival, where they have won numerous awards over the years. Mirch Masala was one of Mehta's notable efforts, and won him the Best Film Award at Hawaii. It was released to 52 cinemas in the United States. Mehta has also had the honour of serving as a member of the jury in various national and international film festivals.

Mehta directed a biopic Sardar, on the life of Sardar Vallabhbhai Patel, in 1993. His latest two films Rang Rasiya, 2014 and Manjhi the Mountain Man, 2015 both opened to tepid box office and universally positive critical reviews. Manjhi the Mountain Man starred Nawazuddin Siddiqui.

== Awards and recognition ==
- National Film Award
  - 1981: Best Feature Film on National Integration: Bhavni Bhavai
  - 1994: Best Feature Film on National Integration: Sardar
- 15th Moscow International Film Festival: Nominated Golden Prize: Mirch Masala
- 2010: Ordre des Arts et des Lettres (French Government)
- Filmfare Award
  - 1993: Best Documentary: All in the Family
- 2010 Honoured with Life Membership of International Film And Television Club of Asian Academy of Film & Television by Sandeep Marwah
- 2015: Honoured with Global Cinema Award by Sandeep Marwah at 8th Global Film Festival Noida.
- 2015: Honoured with Standing Ovation Award by Siby Malayil at All Lights India International Film Festival

== Personal life ==
He is married to actress Deepa Sahi who has acted in three of his films, Maya Memsaab, Oh Darling! Yeh Hai India and Aar Ya Paar. Together they founded the Maya Academy of Advanced Cinematics and Maya Digital Studios. He is the nephew of Gandhian and freedom fighter, Usha Mehta. His younger brother, Dr. Yatin Mehta, is Chairman of Medanta Institute of Critical Care and Anesthesiology, Gurgaon, Haryana. His youngest brother is Dr. Nirad Mehta, Consultant Radiologist at Hinduja Hospital, Mumbai.

== Filmography ==
=== Director ===
- Bhavni Bhavai (1980)
- Holi (1984)
- Mirch Masala (1985)
- Mr. Yogi (TV series) (1988)
- Hero Hiralal (1989)
- Maya Memsaab (1993)
- Sardar (1993)
- Oh Darling! Yeh Hai India (1995)
- Aar Ya Paar (1997)
- Captain Vyom (TV series) (1998)
- Mangal Pandey: The Rising (2005)
- Time Bomb 9/11 (TV series) (2005)
- Rang Rasiya (2014)
- Manjhi: The Mountain Man (2015)
- Toba Tek Singh (2018)
- Freedom Radio (2022)
- Jai Somnath (2027)

=== Producer ===
- Holi (1984)
- Maya Memsaab (1993)
- Time Bomb 9/11 (TV Series) (2005)
- Ramayana: The Epic (2010)
- Tere Mere Phere (2011)
- Rang Rasiya (2014)
- Motu Patlu: King of Kings (2016)
