= Paduka =

South Asian footwear

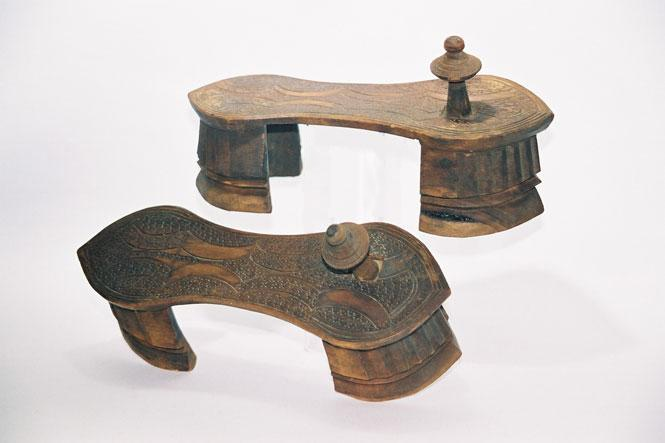
Elaborate paduka with high platform was part of a bride's trousseau.

Paduka (Sanskrit: पादुक, romanized: pāduka) is an ancient form of footwear in India, consisting of a sole with a post and knob which is positioned between the big and second toe. It has been historically worn in South Asia and Southeast Asia. Paduka exist in a variety of forms and materials. They might be made in the shape of actual feet, or of fish, for example, and have been made of wood, ivory and silver. They may be elaborately decorated, such as when used as part of a bride's trousseau, but could also be given as religious offerings or themselves be the object of veneration.

Although simple wooden padukas could be worn by common people, padukas of fine teak, ebony and sandalwood, inlaid with ivory or wire, were a mark of the wearer's high status. In the modern world, padukas are worn as footwear by mendicants and saints of Hinduism, Buddhism, and Jainism. Its significance in Hinduism is linked to the epic Ramayana. Paduka can also refer to the footprints of deities and saints that are venerated in symbolic form in houses and purpose-built temples. One such temple is the Vishnupad Mandir in Gaya, India. Similarly, Buddha footprints are worshipped under the Bodhi Tree in Bodh Gaya.

Paduka are a royal symbol in Malaysia. The Malay title Seri Paduka is roughly analogous to "His Majesty", and is bestowed as an honour to recognition dignitaries of the Malaysian court.

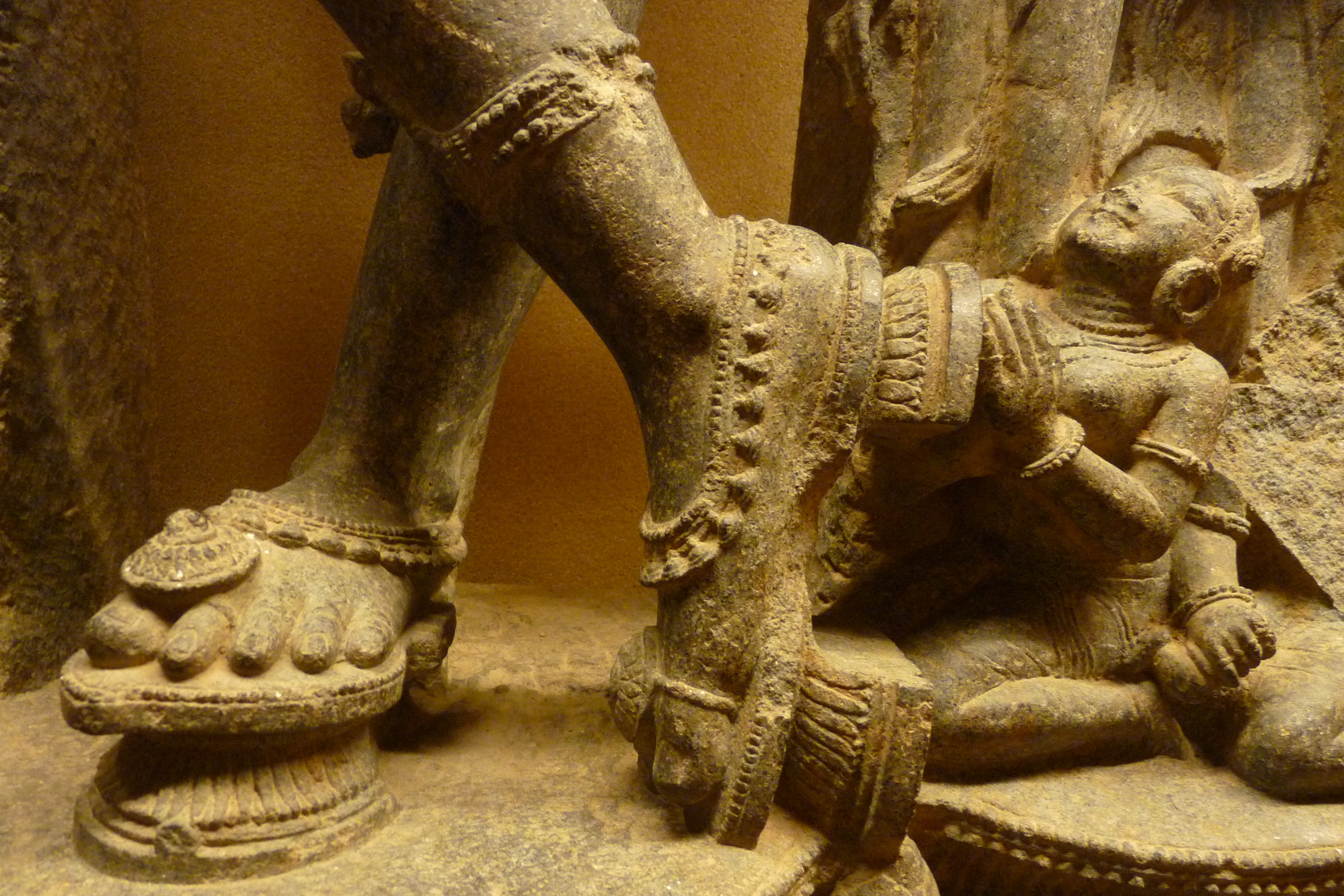
Detail of paduka on sculpture, Orissa State Museum, Bhubaneswar

== Etymology ==
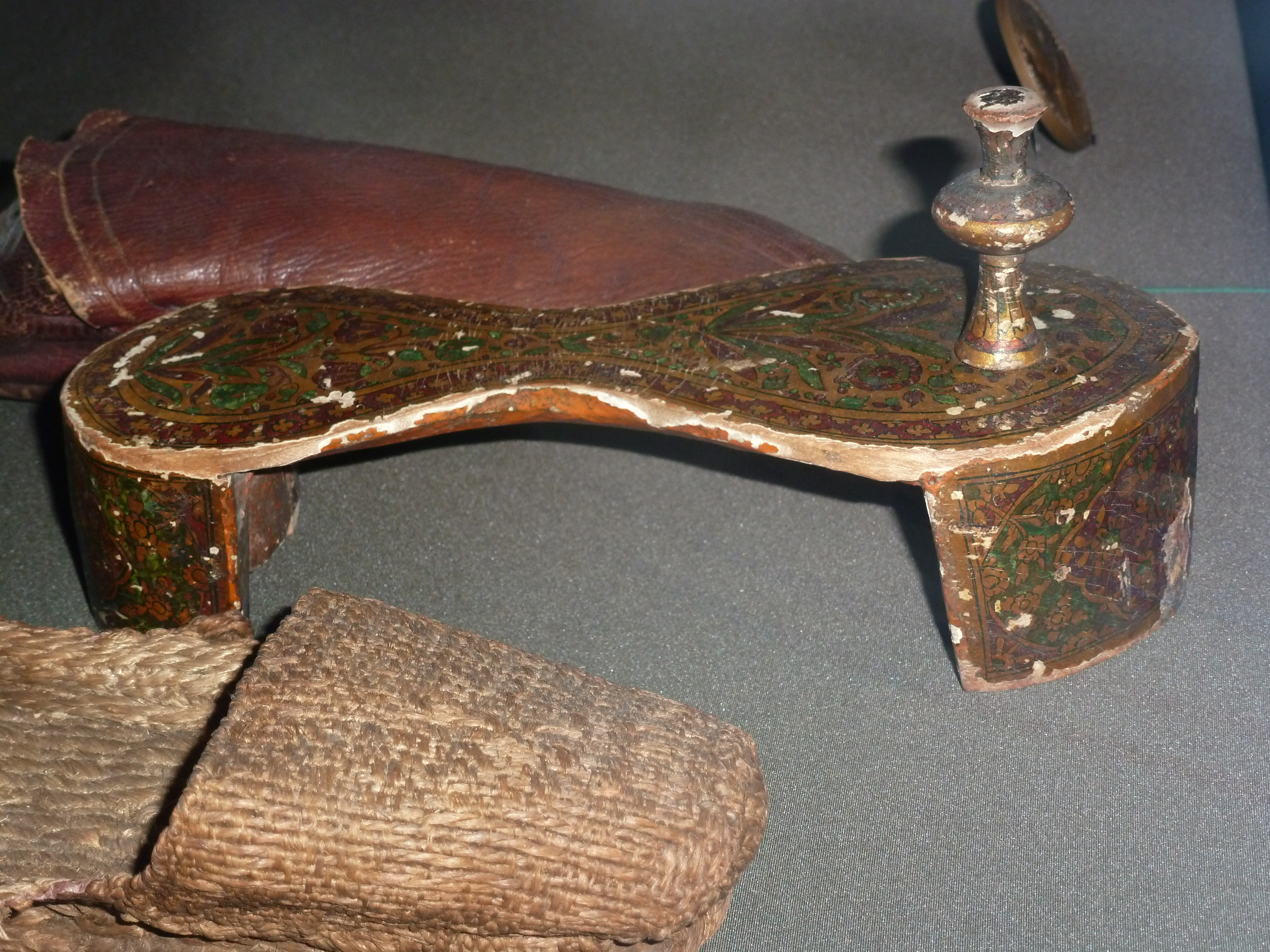
Painted Indian pāduka collected by Hans Sloane (1660–1753), now in the collection of the British Museum

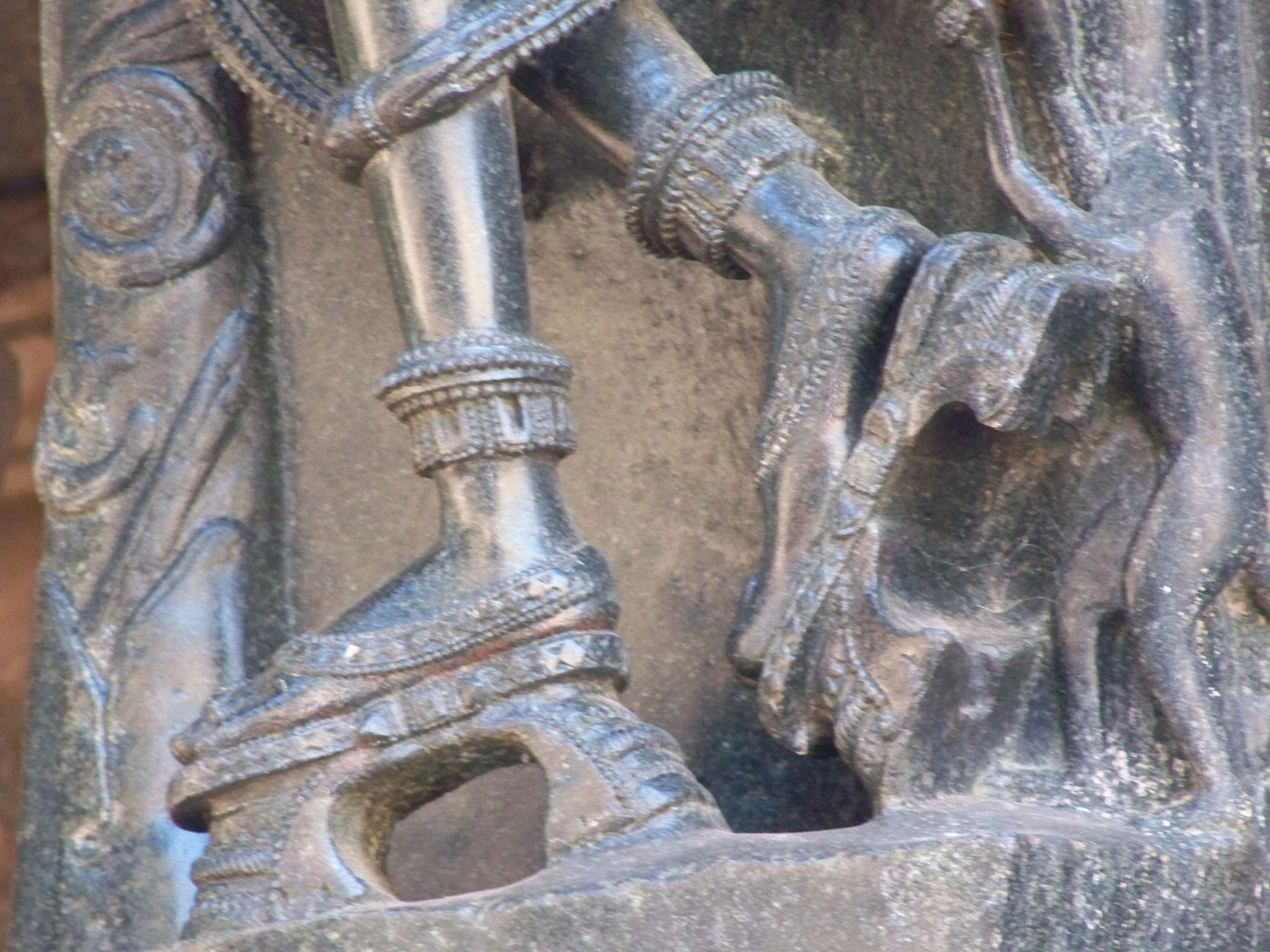
Female figure with paduka, 11th century

The Sanskrit word pāduka is derivative of pāda meaning 'foot'. This terminology was coined to define India's ancient archetypal footwear.

== Legends ==
The word pada ('foot') is cited in the ancient Hindu scripture Rigveda as representing the universe, namely the Prithvi (earth), Vayu (air), Akasha (sky), and the element of the realm beyond the sky.

In the Hindu epic Ramayana, King Dasharatha sent his son Rama (an incarnation of Vishnu) into exile for 14 years at the behest of his wife Kaikeyi (the stepmother of Rama), who wanted her son Bharata to be crowned in Rama's place. However, Bharata did not wish to rule the kingdom, and visited Rama in exile, beseeching him to return to Ayodhya. When Rama replied that he would return only after completing his exile, Bharata requested Rama's padukas to serve as his proxy, to be crowned and to serve as an object of veneration for Rama's followers. Bharata carried Rama's golden padukas with great reverence by placing them on his head as a mark of his obedience to his elder brother. Bharata ruled Kosala as Rama's regent in the name of "Rama's padukas".

== Construction ==
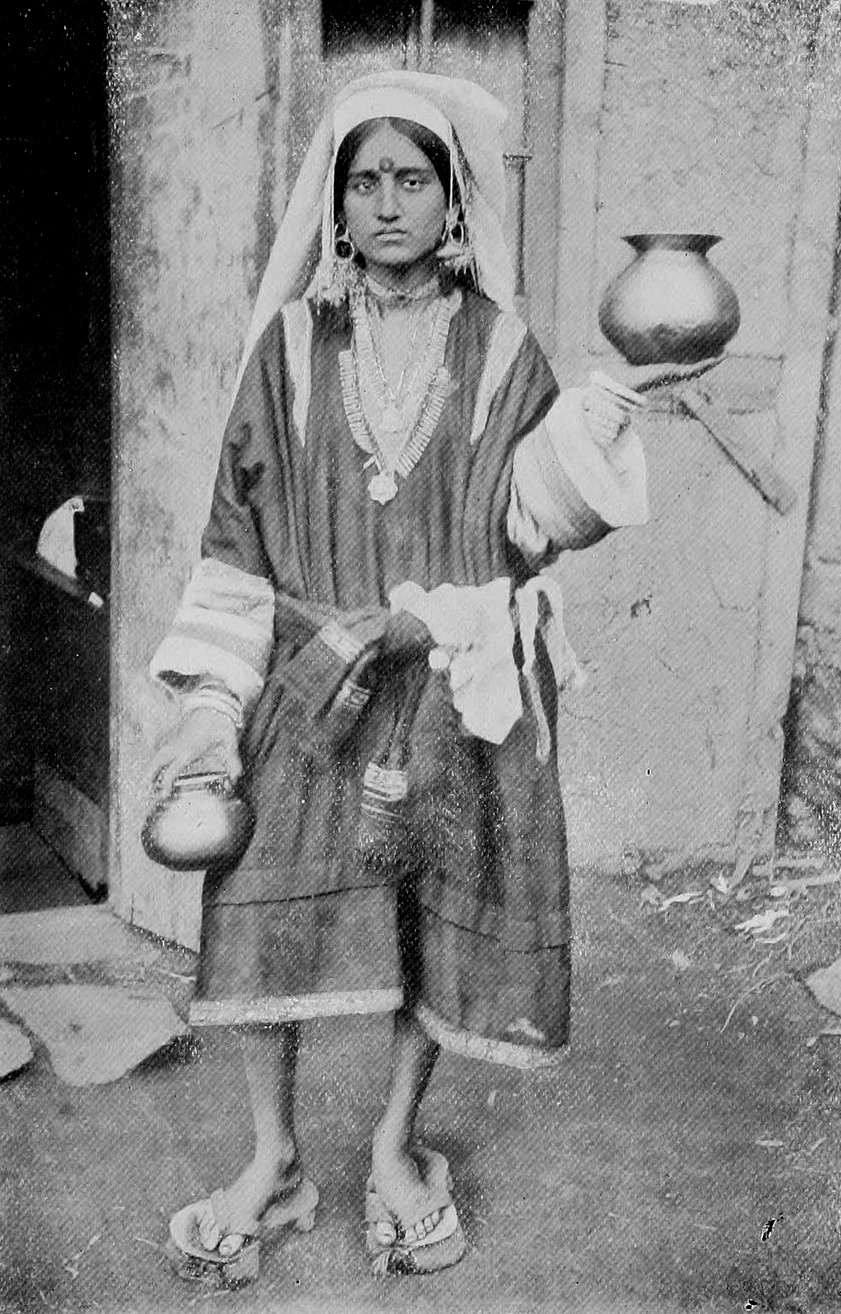
Kashmiri Pandit woman wearing strapped paduka c. 1922

The footwear is practically a sandal which generally has a wooden sole with a post and a stub to provide grip between the big and second toe. It does not have straps of any kind to adhere the sole to the foot, so the wearer has to actively grip the post between the two toes to keep the sandal in place while walking.

It is also known as khadau, karrow, kharawan and karom, and used in the Indian subcontinent mostly by mendicants, saints and commoners. Made in the shape of the footprints, with two narrow and curved stilts, the design is specific to ensure that the principle of non-violence – practised by the saintly followers of Hindu and Jain religions – is not violated by accidental trampling of insects and vegetation. The Brahmins wearing such a paduka may be heard praying: "Forgive me Mother Earth the sin of injury, the violence I do, by placing my feet upon you this morning."

Padukas made of ivory were in popular use among royalty and saints. Hindu religious ethos requires that the ivory be taken from elephants which died naturally or harvested from domesticated elephants, in a manner which avoids cruelty. People of high societal status wear padukas made of fine teak, ebony and sandalwood and inlaid with ivory or wire. They are also made in the shape of fish as a symbol of fertility.

Other forms of padukas worn on special occasions may be incised with silver or of wood covered with silver plates and sometimes adorned with bells to sound upon walking. Bronze and brass padukas may be worn for ritual and ceremonial use.

A unique pair of wooden padukas that are minutely painted and have their toe knobs topped with ivory lotus flowers. At each step, a trigger mechanism in the sole signals the lotus to open from bud to blossom. They are also made in the shape of an hourglass or with carved toes.

Eighteenth-century footwear used as ritual wear made of "wood with bed of sharp iron spikes" has been found. It is inferred that it was meant to be used to inflict pain to the wearer to demonstrate his conviction in religious forbearance of pain.

== Veneration ==
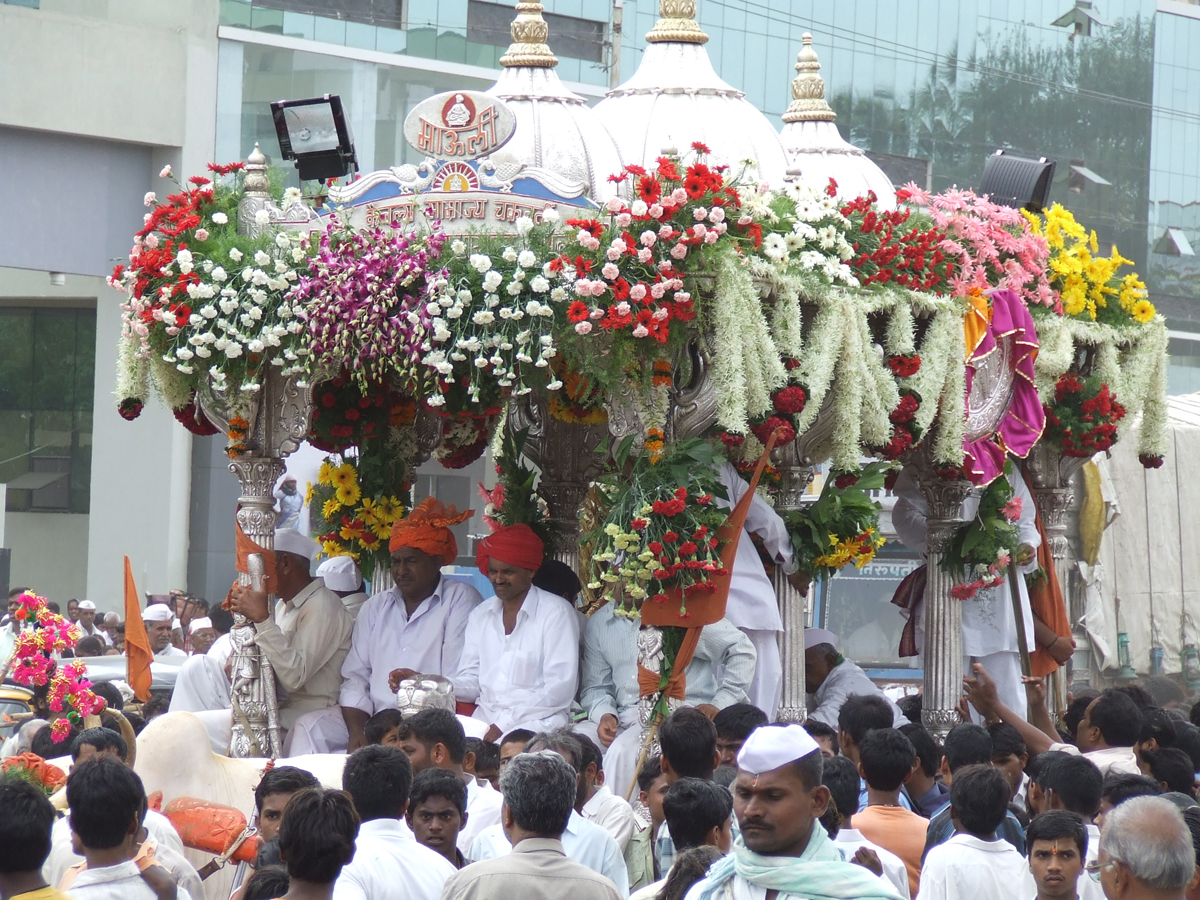
Paduka of saint Dnyaneshwar is carried in a palanquin in a silver bullock cart in procession from Alandi to Pandharpur.

Paduka is often gifted as part of a bride's dowry. They are worshipped and given as votive offerings by faithful believers.

In a festival associated with the Hindu god Vithoba, pilgrims travel to his Pandharpur temple from Alandi and Dehu towns that are closely associated with poet-saints Dnyaneshwar and Tukaram (respectively), carrying the padukas of the saints in a silver palkhi (palanquin).

A popular religious belief is of the contact (sparsh) with the salabhanjika sculpture yakshini's foot. It is said that when the yakshini encircles a dormant tree with her leg around it, it starts to blossom and bear fruit. Shalabhanjika yakshi is also an embellishment in the form of an architectural bracket in many Hindu temples.

Another notable feature of veneration is of the goddess Lakshmi, the goddess of prosperity. On Deepavali festival day, Lakshmi is devotionally ushered into the house through symbolic representation with a series of her footprints (paduka) drawn in paint or kolam and lit with oil lamps, from the main door to the private sanctum. This is done with the wish that good fortune shall be bestowed by her upon the householders.

Below the Bodhi tree at Bodh Gaya where Buddha received enlightenment, there is a vacant throne that is adorned with the foot prints on a foot rest of the Buddha. This place is deeply venerated.

In South Indian Vishnu temples, priests offer the satari, a gold or silver plated crown that features the feet of Vishnu to bless devotees, who bow low so that it is ritually placed upon their heads.

=== Vishnupada temple ===
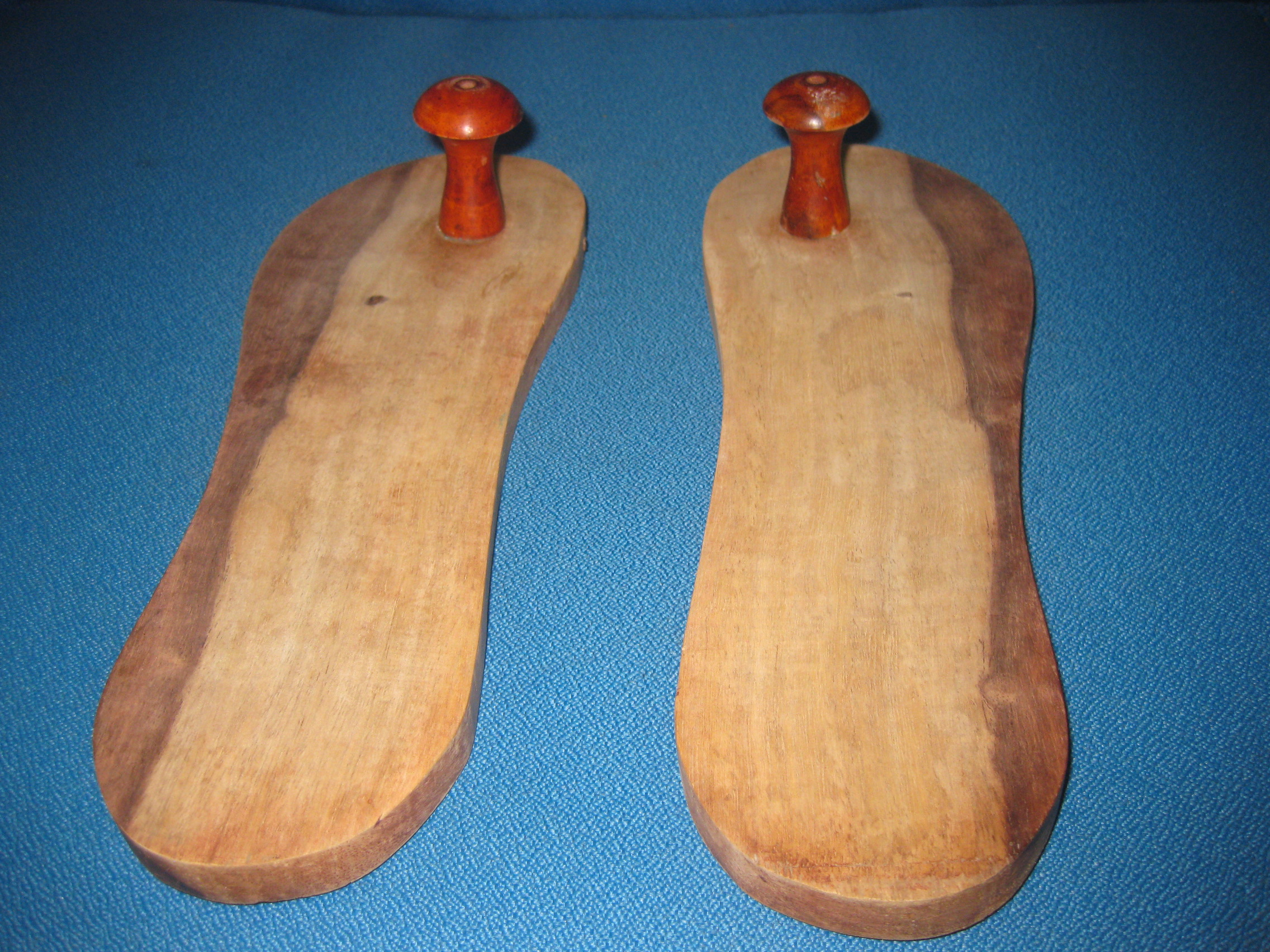
These simple Padukas are worn by saints and mendicants.

The Vishnupada Temple is said to enshrine the footprints of Vishnu. This footprint denotes the act of Vishnu subduing Gayasura by placing his foot on his chest. Inside the temple, the 40-centimetre-long (16 in) footprint is imprinted in solid rock and surrounded by a silver-plated octagonal enclosure. The temple is 30 metres (98 ft) in height and has 8 rows of elegantly carved pillars that support the pavilion.

=== Paduka Sahasram ===
The Paduka Sahasram (lit. '1,000 verses on the footwear' (of Ranganatha)) is a devotional poem extolling the virtues of worshipping the paduka (feet) of Vishnu, enshrined in Sri Ranganathaswamy Temple of Srirangam, Tamil Nadu. The poem was composed in 1,008 verses in 32 chapters by Vedanta Desika, a proponent of the Vishishtadvaita philosophy. According to Sri Vaishnava tradition, the 1,000 verses of the Paduka Sahasra were composed in a single night by Vedanta Desika as a part of a literary contest. By doing so, the poet defeated Alagiya Manavala Perumal, a theologian of the Tenkalai sect, who had only been able to compose 300 verses during the allotted period.

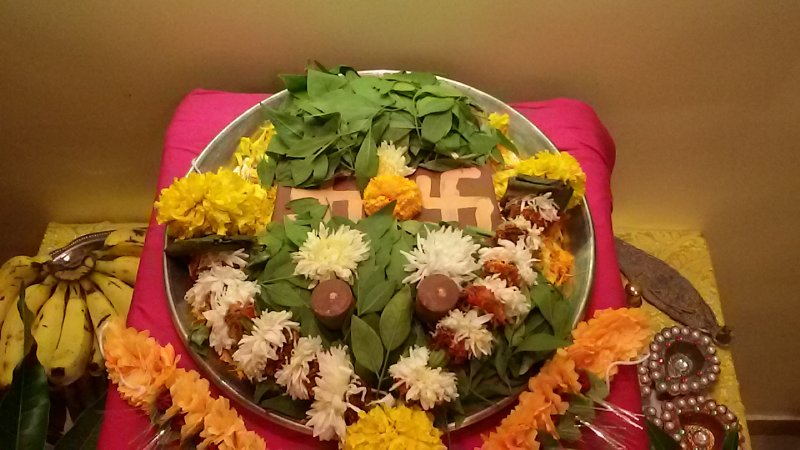
Paduka Poojan done during Satchidanand Utsav

=== Guru Paduka Stotram ===
Adi Shankara has also written nine devotional verses under the title "Guru Paduka Stotram" as salutations to his guru. An English translation of the first verse is:

Salutations and Salutations to the sandals of my Guru,
Which is a boat, which helps me, cross the endless ocean of life,
Which endows me, with the sense of devotion to my Guru,
And by worship of which, I attain the dominion of renunciation.

== Gallery ==
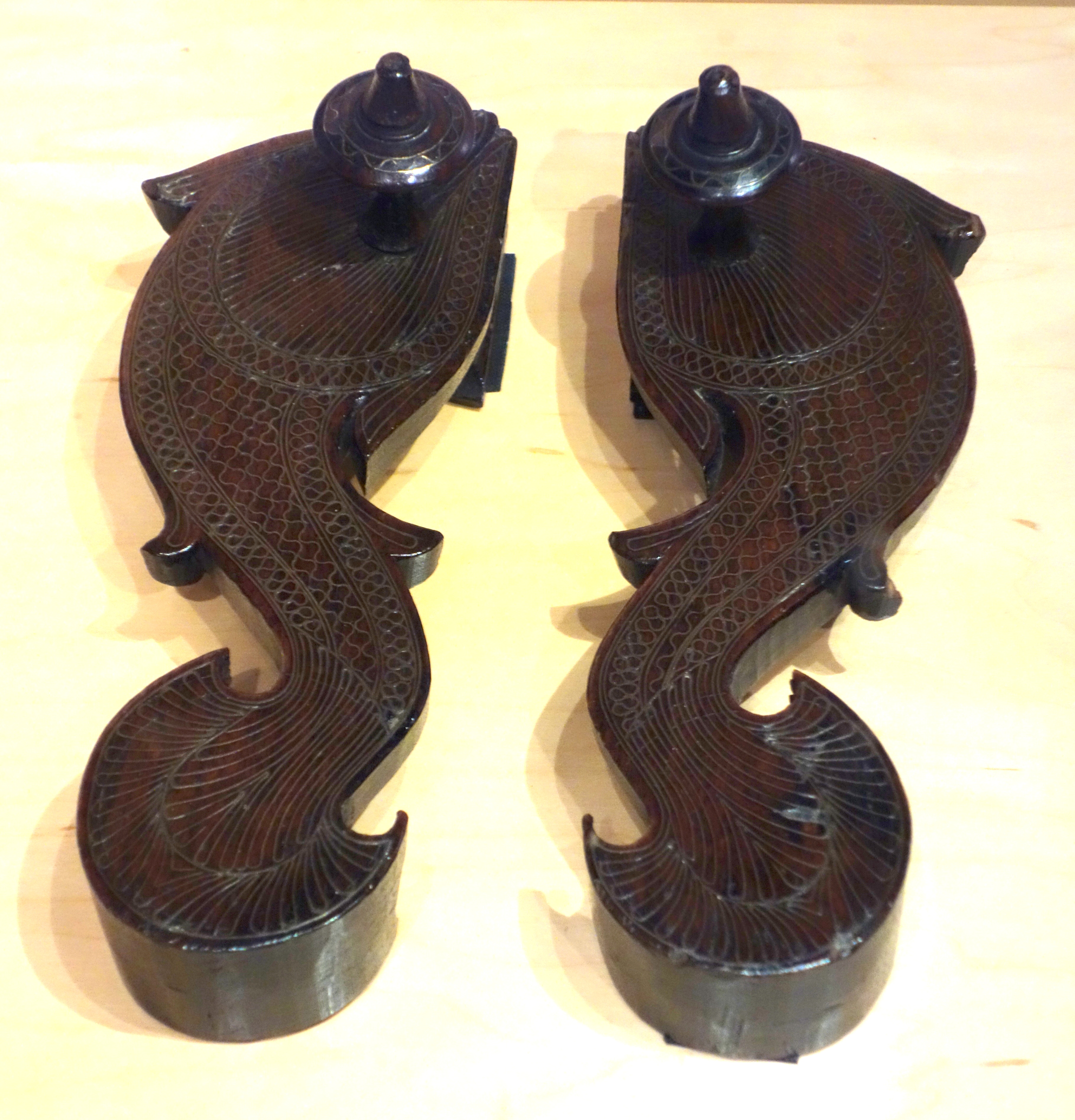
Paduka at exhibit in the Bata Shoe Museum

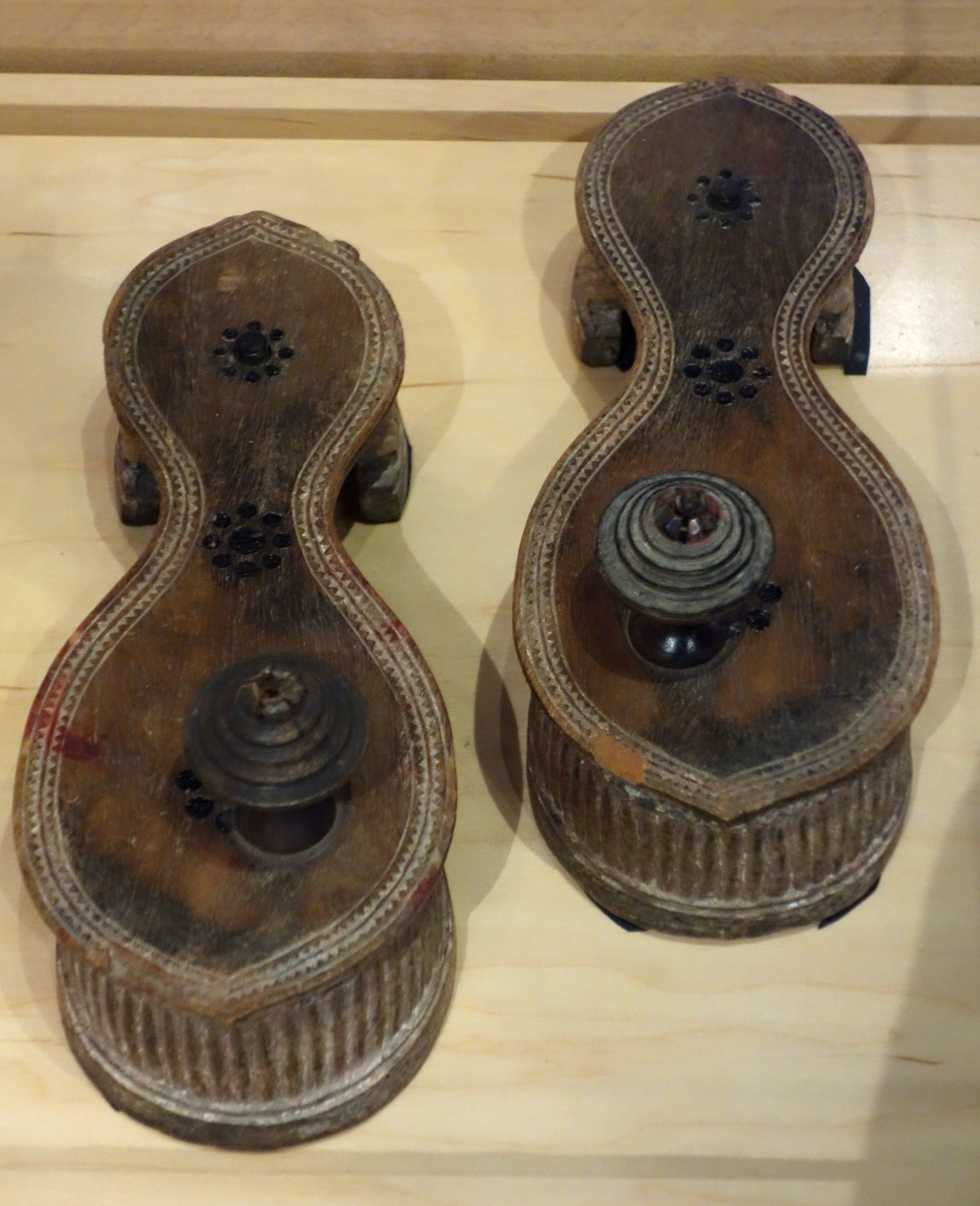
Exhibit in the Bata Shoe Museum

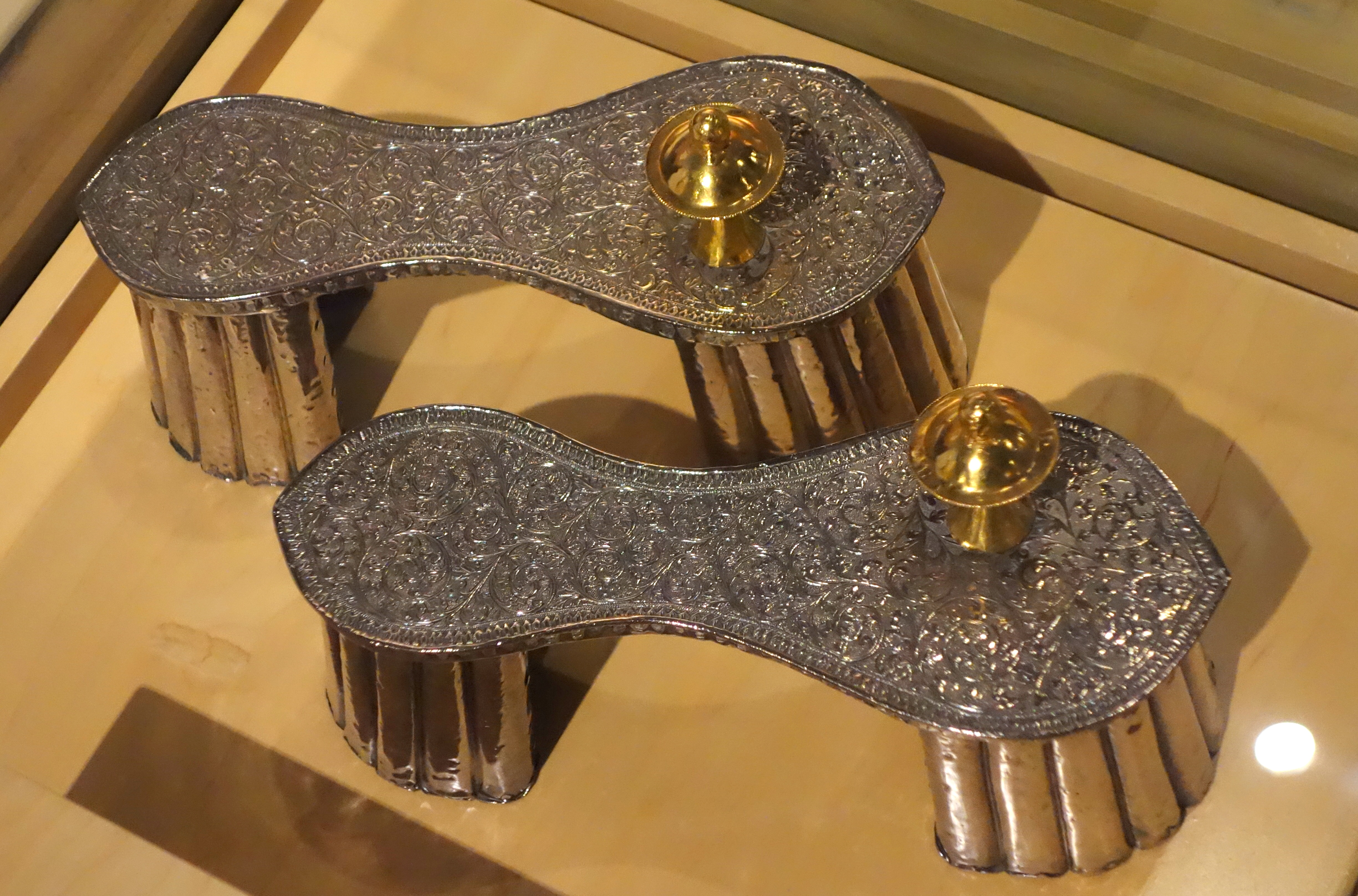
Silver paduka, Bata Shoe Museum

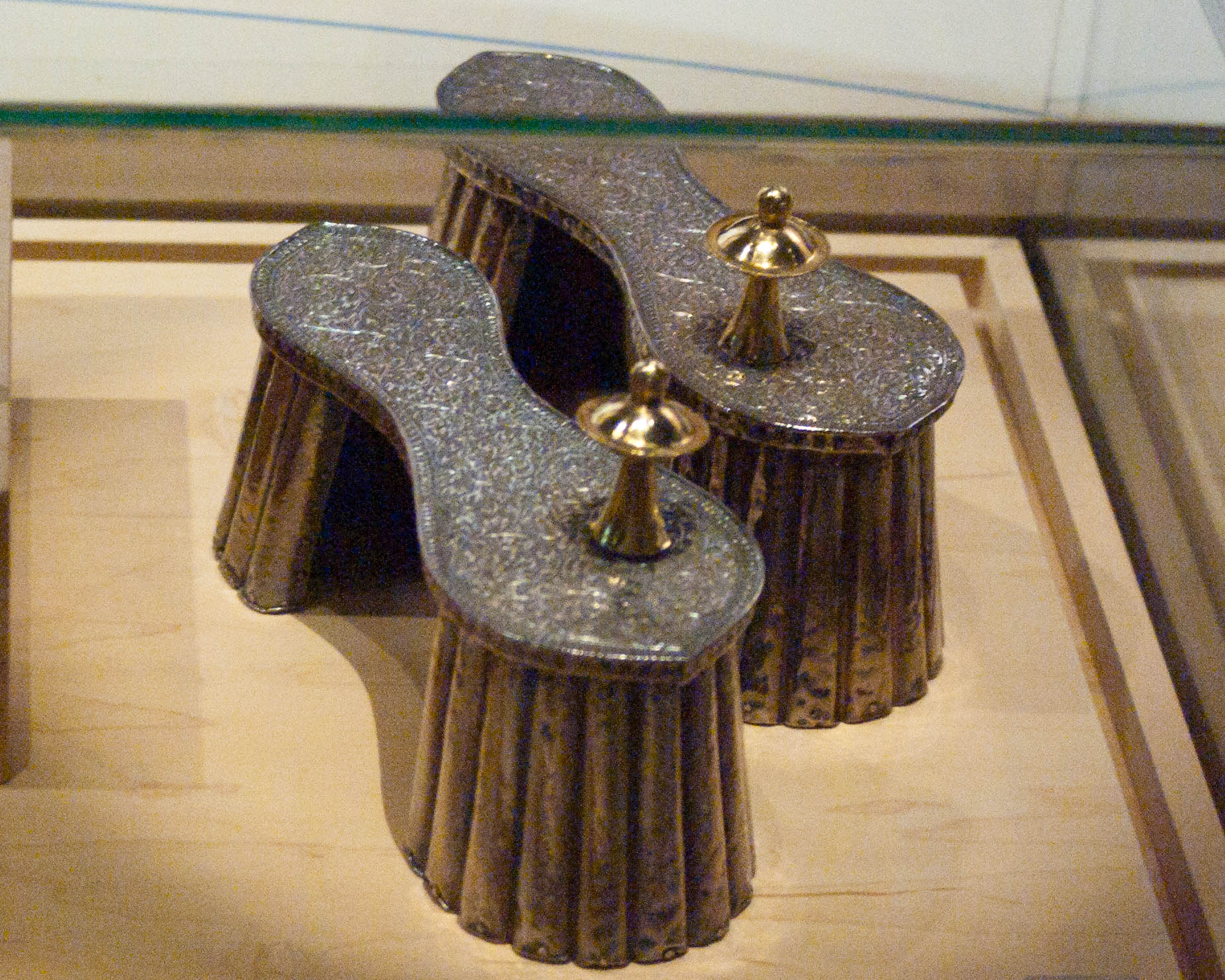
Silver paduka, Bata Shoe Museum

== See also ==
- List of shoe styles
- Chappal, known as "flip-flops" outside India
- Sandal
- Upanah
