= Paraiya (community development block) =

Community development block in Gaya district, Bihar, India

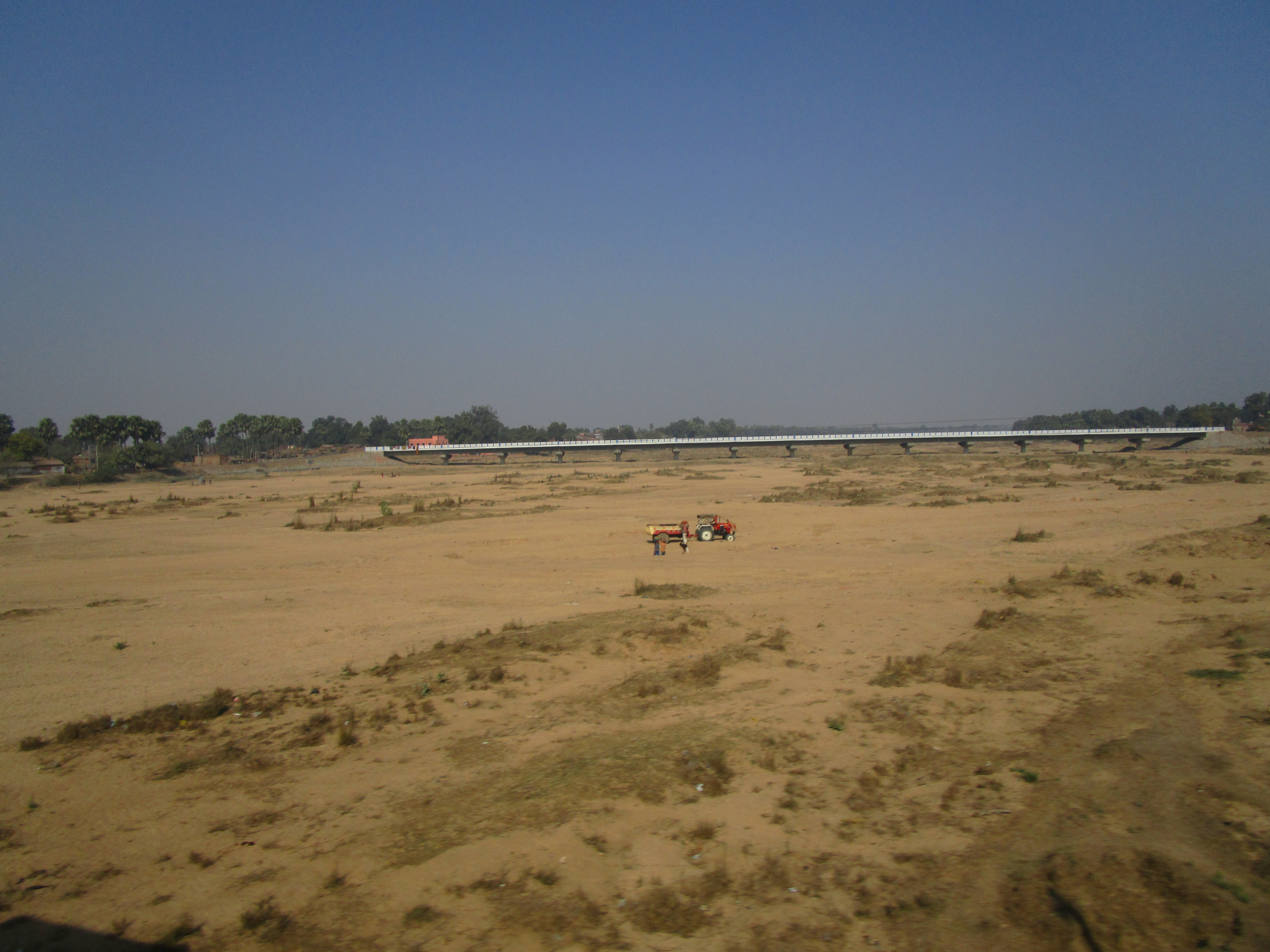
Morhar River at Paraiya, Bihar

Paraiya is a block in Gaya district of Bihar state, India. The Paraiya Block headquarters is Paraiya Khurd town, part of the Magadh division. It is located 17 km west of the district headquarters in Gaya, and 109 km north of the state capital Patna. Paraiya block is bounded by Guraru block to the west, Konch block to the east, and Tekari Block to the north. Bodh Gaya, Rafiganj, and Sherghati are nearby cities. Paraiya consists of 151 villages and 9 panchayats. Malahi Chak is the smallest village; Solara, the largest.

Baigoman is one of the zamindari village in Paraiya granted by Tekari Raj to Babu Kashinath Singh of Saran, who helped Tekari Raj to solve the issue of southern dam and provided water to the estate. Also, Babu Ram Swarath Singh fought against zamindar of Sherghati along with the king of Tekari Raj Bodh Gaya, Chatra, Kakolat, Bihar Sharif, and Koderma are nearby tourist destinations.

== Notable people ==
- Babu Rajpati Singh, former Zamindar of Baigoman and freedom fighter
- Babu Raghunath Singh Baigoman, social worker, Sarpanch, and former Zamindar of Baigoman

== Geography ==
Paraiya is situated between the two rainy rivers Morhar and Sorhar. Paraiya situated at the highest and oldest alluvial plain, made up of the sediments brought from the erosion of the hills and always lies above the flood level of the present day river.

and always lies above the flood level of the present day river because it is the

== Demographics of Paraiya Block ==
Magahi is the local language, with Hindi, Urdu, and English also spoken. The total population of Paraiya Block is 83,800 living in 12,749 houses. Males number 43,217 and females 40,583.
