= Nazareth Academy, Gaya =

Coordinates: 24.7936°N 84.9931°E

Nazareth Academy

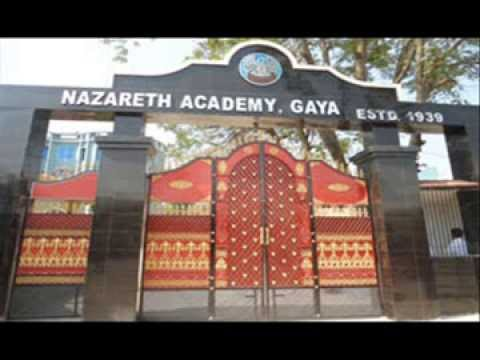
- The School Entrance

Location
- Old Karimganj; Gaya, Bihar, 823001; India

Information
- Former name: St. Michael's School (1939–1953)
- School type: Convent
- Motto: The love of Christ impels us
- Denomination: Roman Catholic
- Established: 1939
- Area trustee: Sisters of Charity of Nazareth
- Principal: Sister Anita Tigga
- Staff: 20
- Faculty: 70
- Gender: Co-education
- Enrolment: 2000+
- Language: English
- Campus size: 4 acres
- Houses: Blue, Green, Red, Yellow
- Nickname: Nazareth
- Accreditation: Central Board of Secondary Education
- Yearbook: Nazareth Darpan
- Affiliation: Central Board of Secondary Education
- Alumni: Nazareth Old Students Association
- Website: www.nazarethgaya.org

Nazareth Academy (formerly St. Michael’s School, 1939–1953) is a private Roman Catholic secondary school in Old Karimganj, Gaya, Bihar, India. Established in 1939 and administered by the Sisters of Charity of Nazareth, the school is affiliated with the Central Board of Secondary Education and operates under the Roman Catholic Archdiocese of Patna. It serves students from primary through senior secondary levels.

== History ==
The school was established as Saint Michael's School Gaya, Bihar in 1939. Nazareth Academy, Gaya was founded in 1953, under the control of the Sisters of Charity of Nazareth by Sister Ann Bernadette, Sister Patricia Mary and Sister Ellen Maria. It is associated with the Roman Catholic Archdiocese of Patna.

Though it has been a school for more than 50 years, it has not always been Nazareth Academy. The school opened on 2 February 1939 under the banner of Saint Michael's School. Under the leadership of Mother Engelbert, the Sisters of the Institute of the Blessed Virgin Mary came to establish this first convent school in Gaya. The school was originally a Hindi medium, though it slowly evolved into two sections - Hindi and English - and ultimately it became an English medium with Hindi as a subject.

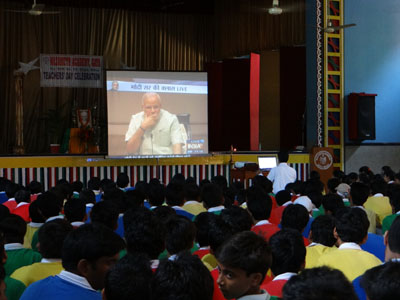
Students watching the Indian Prime Minister

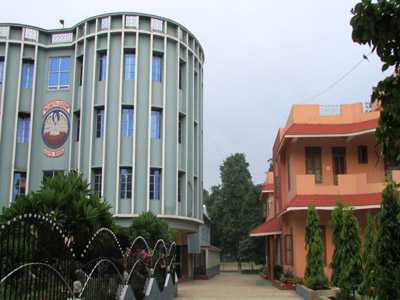
The new wing constructed in 2009 along with the residence quarters

By 1953 ground was broken for a school building with five new classrooms. In 1955, the former Mazumdar property next door was purchased. 1964 saw the third story put on the building from 1953 plus a further wing of nine more classrooms. The school hall and library room were added in 1969, followed in 1974-76 by the high school building with twelve more classrooms. The administration block was built in 1990 and the primary section block was built in 1993. The newest construction on the campus, situated in front of the auditorium, consisting of two state-of-the-art computer labs, and mathematics and language labs, was inaugurated on 22 October 2009.

The first location of the school was in a house on Katari Hill Road. Two moves after that, by 1942, it had shifted to the present site, which had been originally a Masonic Lodge, and later a private residence expanded by the owner into its present form.

Mother Engelbert, Sister Carina, Sister Melita, and Sister Stanislaus laid a foundation; World War II came, and by mid-1942, the Sisters, who belonged to the German Loreto Sisters, had to leave Gaya for their larger institutions in India.

A second group of Sisters, the Irish Loreto Mothers, took over the school in 1943. The school, under its second name, Loreto Convent, continued to grow in numbers. It had been co-educational from the very beginning. Classes were added on and by the late 1940s students were being prepared for both Junior and Senior Cambridge examinations, which they took as private candidates in the recognized Cambridge schools in Patna. Again history intervened. The large Loreto institutions in India needed more personnel, and in 1950 the administration decided to close the institution which was to be Nazareth Academy.

Nazareth Academy had its Platinum Jubilee in 2014.

== Curriculum ==
The course of studies has changed considerably. The Junior and Senior Cambridge Courses were eventually discarded, and for some years the students became private candidates for the Bihar Board examinations. For a few years, boys were allowed only up to class VII, but by 1975 they were again admitted for all classes up through matriculation. In 1981 recognition from the Central Board of Secondary Education in Delhi was obtained, and the first candidates passed in 1983. Each year has seen a class of approximately 140 boys and girls passing the All India Secondary School Examination of the Delhi Board. At present it is a Senior Secondary School.

== Campus ==
=== Nazareth Gyan Jyoti School ===
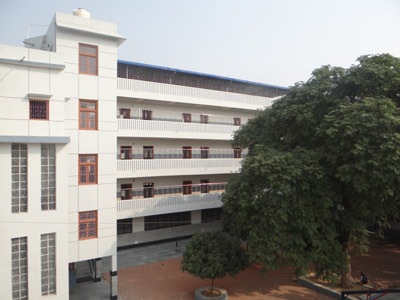
Pre-School

Nazareth Gyan Jyoti School (Formerly known as After Noon School) is an integral part of Nazareth Academy's outreach program. It was begun in 1975 when the Sisters became acutely aware of education for the non-school-going children of their neighbourhood. Non-formal classes were conducted after regular school hours. In later years as the number of children increased, the school was formally organized with a set of teachers and formal classes for three hours daily. At present, there are over 300 children from classes KG to VIII. some of the older children attend government schools in the morning hours and make use of the benefits provided by the government.

== Alumni ==
The school maintains an alumni association that supports former students and institutional initiatives. Nazareth Old Students Association (NOSA) is an alumnus organization for graduates of Nazareth Academy.

== Former headteachers ==
With increased enrollment, the school staff has also expanded. The first two Principals were Sister Charles Miriam and Sister James Leo. The teaching staff expanded, and the school passed from American to Indian hands. Subsequent Principals have been: Sister Anne Marie, Sister Ann George, Sister Ann Palatty, Sister Reena, Sister Vijaya and the present principal Sister Sophia Joseph.

Mother Helena, Mother Pauline, Mother Raphael, Mother Victorine, Mother Germaine and Mother Agnes (both died in Gaya), Mother Pauline and Sister Jude and others were among the Sisters who had continued building up the educational institution which was Loreto Convent, which, in January 1951, became Nazareth Academy. The band of four Sisters of Charity of Nazareth who arrived on 28 December 1950 to staff the school were: Sister Charles Miriam, Sister Ann Bernadette, Sister Ann Roberta, and Sister Ellen Maria. Sister Charles Miriam took up the administration as Principal.

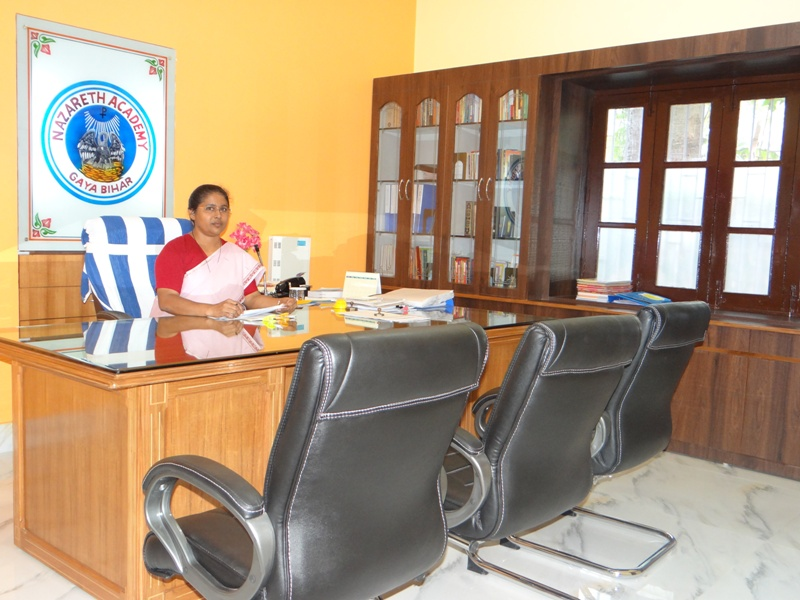
The current Principal of the school - Sr. Anita Tigga

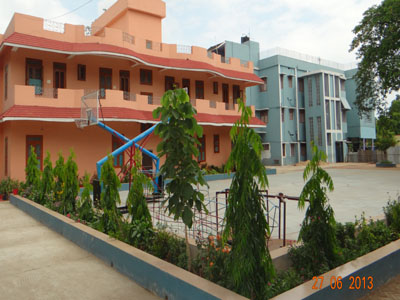
Basketball Court

== Photo gallery ==
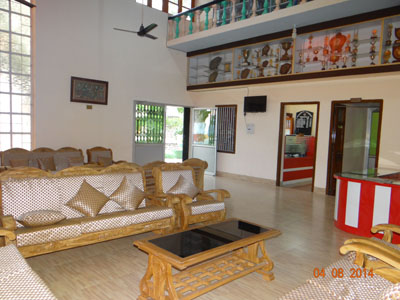
The Administrative Block

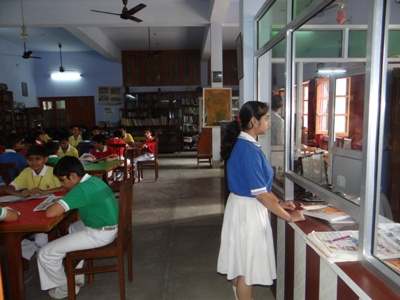
Library

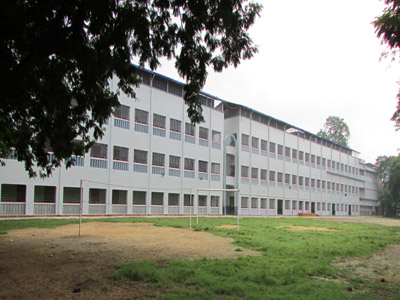
The Secondary Section
