= Upanah =

Ancient Indian footwear

Upanah (Sanskrit) is an ancient form of footwear from India. The term is used to refer to several types of strapped sandals and shoes employed by common people, in contrast to monks and mendicants who would use paduka instead. The word comes from the Sansakrit root nah, meaning "to tie", "to bind", to "fasten", as well as pad, meaning "foot". Combined words like charan-upanah might have originated modern words like "chappal".

== History ==
Upanah or upanat are mentioned in ancient Vedic texts like Yajurveda and Atharvaveda. They were the most common type of footwear in ancient India, even although chronicles also describe Indians as favoring walking barefoot regardless of social class, at least as late as Xuanzang's times. They were used from members of the lower castes to religious practitioners and vratya ascetics.

Texts by Patanjali make a separation between footwear made of leather (upanah charma or cham) and wood (upanah dam). Leather sandals and shoes would be usually made of antelope or boarskin, as well as other, more expensive skins that would be a sign of status, while others would be made of wood, wool or balbaja grass. Other kinds of similar shoes reflected in the Mahāvyutpatti were pula, mandapula and padavestanika, as well as vaturinapada, foot guards used by warriors.

== See also ==
- Chappal
- Paduka
- Sandal
- List of shoe styles
