= Keori =

- village
- Location in Bihar, India Keori (India)
- Coordinates: 25.042492°N 85.181956°E
- Country: India
- State: Bihar
- District: Gaya

Languages
  - Official: Magadhi, Hindi
- Time zone: UTC+5:30 (IST)
- Postal code: 804407
- ISO 3166 code: IN-BR
- Nearest city: Hulasganj

Keori, is a village between Patna and Gaya in Bihar, India. The borders of three districts, Gaya, Jehanabad, and Nalanda, meet here.

== Geography ==
Keori is surrounded by a pond and an aahar (a pond-like structure for water storage, open at one end) on the west and south sides respectively. The other two sides are open and mainly have paddy fields. The road connecting Keori to the Patna-Islampur-Gaya road meets the village at the south-west end (called Bar Tar, that is "beneath a banyan tree") and continues on the bank of the pond up to the north end. The Rajgir mountain ranges can be seen from here to the southeast.
