= Mangla Gauri Temple =

Hindu Temple in Gaya District of Bihar

Mangala Gauri Temple
- Sarvamangala Devi Temple
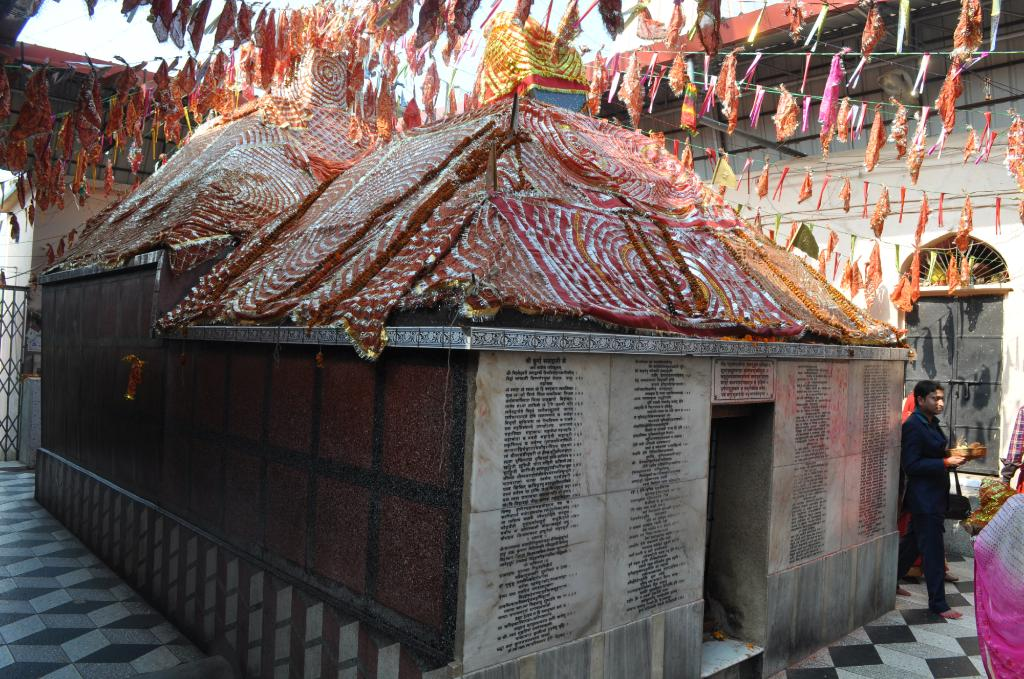
- View of Mangala Gauri Temple at Gaya, Bihar.

- Location within Bihar Location within India Location within Asia

Religion
- Affiliation: Hinduism
- District: Gaya
- Deity: Gauri (Parvati)
- Festival: Navratri

Location
- Location: Shakta pitha
- State: Bihar
- Country: India
- Coordinates: 24°46′30.5″N 85°00′08.3″E

Architecture
- Type: Cave Style
- Creator: Maadho Giri Ji Maharaj (Baba Dandi Swami)
- Completed: 1300 CE

Specifications
- Temple: 9
- Monument: 2
- Inscriptions: Shakta pitha
- Elevation: 134 m (440 ft)

Mangla Gauri Temple (Hindi: मां मंगलागौरी मंदिर) is a Hindu temple and Shakta pitha, in Gaya, Bihar, India was mentioned in Padma Purana, Vayu Purana and Agni Purana and Devi Bhagvata Purana and Markandeya Purana in other scriptures and tantric works. This temple is among the eighteen maha Shakta pithas. The present temple dates back to the 15th century. The shrine is dedicated to Sati or the Hindu Mother Goddess in the predominantly Vaishnavite pilgrimage center of Gaya.

The temple is facing east and is built on top of the Mangalagauri hill. The temple complex has temples of Kali, Ganesha, Hanuman and Shiva.
