= Gayasura =

Asura in Hindu mythology

- Affiliation: Asura
- Texts: Puranas
- Region: Magadha
- Temple: Vishnupad Temple

Genealogy
- Parents: Tripurasura (father)

Gayasura (Sanskrit: गयासुर, romanized: Gayāsura) is an asura mentioned in Hindu texts like Bhagavata Purana and Vayu Purana who lived during the Treta Yuga. According to Hindu literature, he is regarded to have lived in the Magadha of present-day Bihar, India.

According to legend, he was the son of Tripurasura and just like his father, was an ardent devotee of Narayana (one of the several names of the Hindu god Vishnu). Various lores narrate different accounts of his death at the hands of Vishnu after he refused to heed the deity's commands to go beneath the surface of earth. The modern city of Gaya in the Indian state of Bihar derives its name from Gayasura whereas the Vishnupad Temple in the city is believed to be built upon the site where Vishnu had allegedly killed the asura or pinned him underground.

== Legend ==
Gayasura was the son of Tripurasura. He succeeded his father as king after Tripurasura was killed at the hands of Shiva; as per one account, Gayasura once attacked Devaloka to avenge the killing of his father. After his birth, he went to the Kolahala mountains of present-day Kashmir region to meditate, where he famously stood there holding his breath for a very long time. Deities like Indra and other gods were frightened by his intense penance. The deities approached Vishnu and asked him to stop Gayasura's further meditation. Vishnu then thought of a ruse to get Gayasura put an end to his penance by offering him a boon in exchange for halting his tapasya. He, alongside other the other gods, appeared before Gayasura and asked what boon he desired. The asura demanded immortality and asked that he may only be killed by the Trimurti (the triad of Brahma, Vishnu and Shiva).

Emboldened by the boon, he began committing heinous atrocities against other gods. The Trimurti took notice of Gayasura's behaviour and decided to finally punish him. They confronted Gayasura by taking the form Brahmins and said that they would like to perform a yajna (sacrifice) on his body. As soon as Gayasura agreed to serve himself as an altar for the sacrifice, he drastically increased the size of his body. His head immediately fell off, and Brahma and other gods proceeded to perform the ritual on his headless body. However, even after the conclusion of the ritual, Gayasura didn't succumb, and had to be finally slain by Vishnu himself. He slashed Gayasura's body into three pieces with the help of his celestial discus, the Sudarshana Chakra. His head fell in the present-day city of Gaya in Vishnupad Temple (dedicated to Vishnu) and was called Sirogaya (lit. head of Gaya). His navel reached the city of Jajpur in present-day Orissa in Biraja Temple (dedicated to Brahma) and was called Nabhigaya (lit. navel of Gaya) whereas his feet reached the city of Pithapuram in present-day Andhra Pradesh in Kukkuteswara Temple (dedicated to Shiva) and was called Padagaya (lit. feet of Gaya).
