= Vishnupad Temple =

Vishnupada Temple
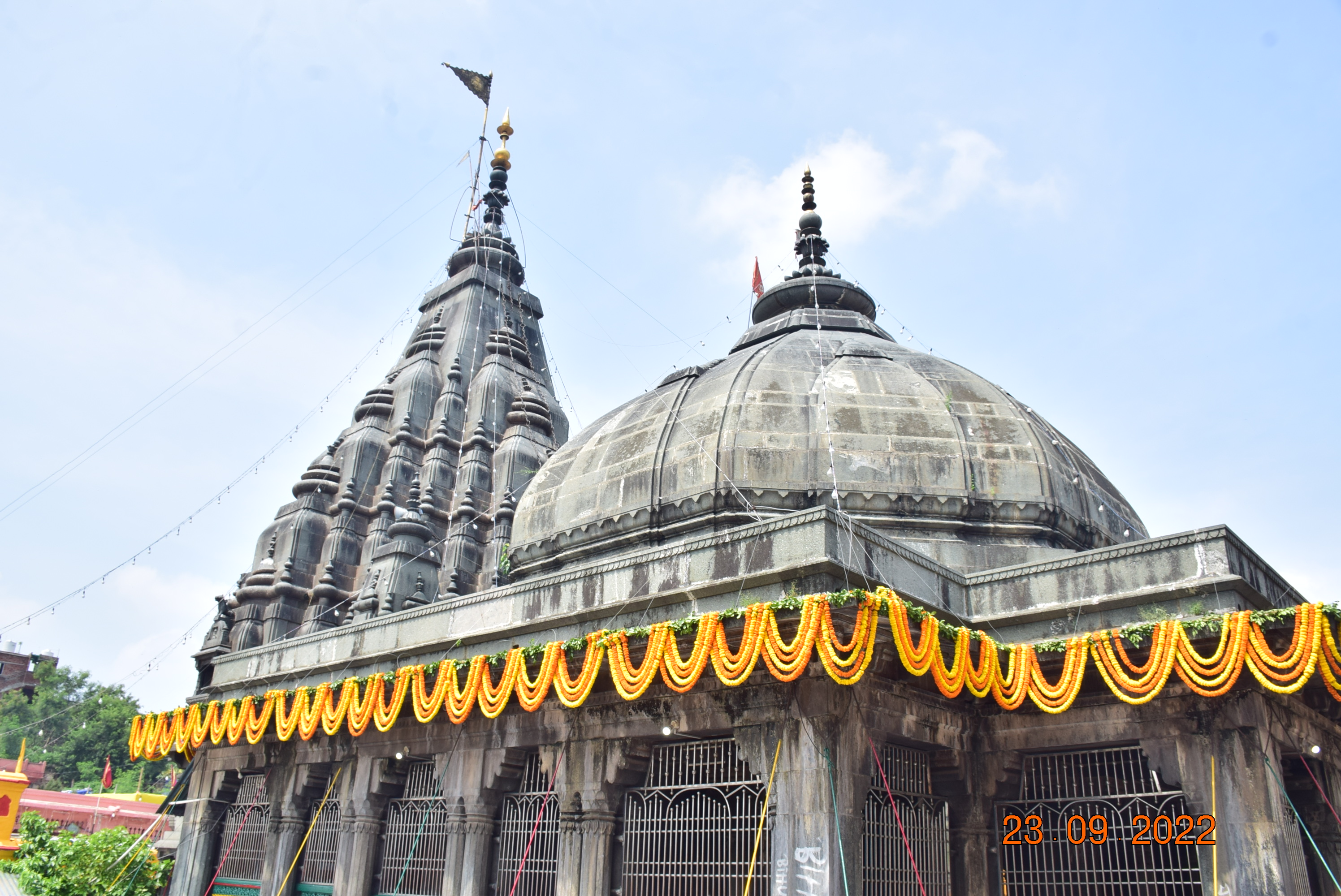
- Vishnupad Temple in Bihar

- Location in Bihar

Religion
- Affiliation: Hinduism
- District: Gaya district
- Deity: Vishnu

Location
- Location: Gaya
- State: Bihar
- Country: India
- Coordinates: 24°36′37″N 85°0′33″E

Architecture
- Type: Shikhara
- Creator: rebuilt by Queen Ahilya Bai Holkar of Indore
- Completed: rebuilt 1787

Vishnupad Temple (Sanskrit: विष्णुपद मंदिर, IAST: Viṣṇupada Mandira; lit. 'temple of Vishnu's feet') is a Hindu temple in Gaya, Bihar, dedicated to Vishnu. Located on the banks of Phalgu river, the temple is believed to be built upon the site where Vishnu had purportedly killed the demon Gayasura and/or eternally pinned him underground. The temple features a 40-cm footprint purported to be of Vishnu incised into a block of basalt, known as Dharmasila which was retained when the deity stepped on Gayasura's chest before pinning him underground.

The Vishnupad temple is the center for Shraddha rites in Gaya. Atop the structure is a 50-kilo gold flag, donated by a devotee, Gayapal Panda Bal Govind Sen. The Vishnupad temple is the center for Shraddha rites in Gaya. The Gayawal Brahmins, also known as the Gayawal Tirth Purohit or Pandas of Gaya, are the traditional priests of the temple. Hindu saints Madhvacharya, Chaitanya Mahaprabhu, and Vallabhacharya visited this shrine.

== Architecture ==
It is believed that the temple was built with the footprints of Vishnu in the centre. In Hinduism, this footprint marks the act of Vishnu subduing Gayasur by placing his foot on his chest. Inside the Vishnupad Mandir, the 40 cm long footprint of Vishnu is imprinted in solid rock and surrounded by a silver plated basin. The height of this temple is 30 meters and it has eight rows of beautifully carved pillars which support the pavilion. The temple is built of large gray granite blocks jointed with iron clamps. The octagonal shrine faces east. Its pyramidal tower rises up a 100 feet. The tower has sloping sides with alternately indented and plain sections. The sections are set at an angle to create a series of peaks joined at the top. Within the temple stands the immortal banyan tree Akshayavat where the final rituals for the dead takes place.

== History and location ==
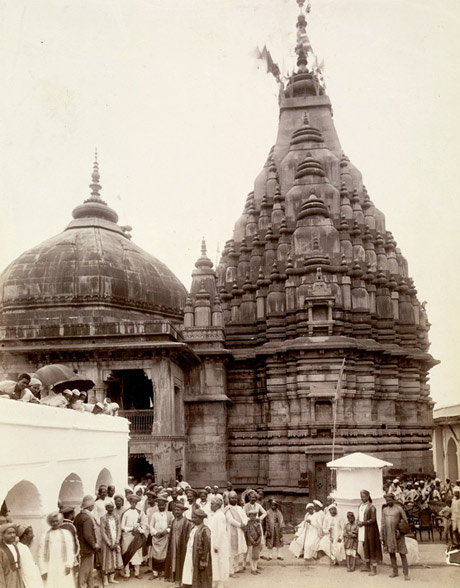
Vishnupad Mandir in 1885

The construction date of temple is unknown and it is believed that Rama along with Sita had visited this place. The present day structure was rebuilt by Devi Ahilya Bai Holkar, the ruler of Indore, in 1787, on the banks of the Falgu river. Ahilyabai Holkar had crafted the temple, sent her officers to inspect and find the best stone for the temple in whole region, and they finally found munger black stone as the best choice in Jaynagar. Since there was no proper road and the mountains were very far from Gaya, the officers found another mountain where they can carve and easily bring the stone to Gaya the place was near Bathani (a small village in Gaya district). The officers brought the craftsmen from Rajasthan. They started carving the temple in Patharkatti (a village and also a tourist place in Bihar). The final temple was assembled in Gaya near Vishnupad temple site. After the completing the construction of temple many craftsmen returned to their native places, but some of them settled-down in Pattharkatti village itself. Bihar government has marked this place as one of the prominent tourist spots of Bihar. The 1000 stone steps leading to the top of the Brahmajuni hill on southwest of the Vishnupad mandir gives the view of Gaya city and the Vishnupad temple, which is a tourist spot. There are also many small temples near this temple.

== Legend ==
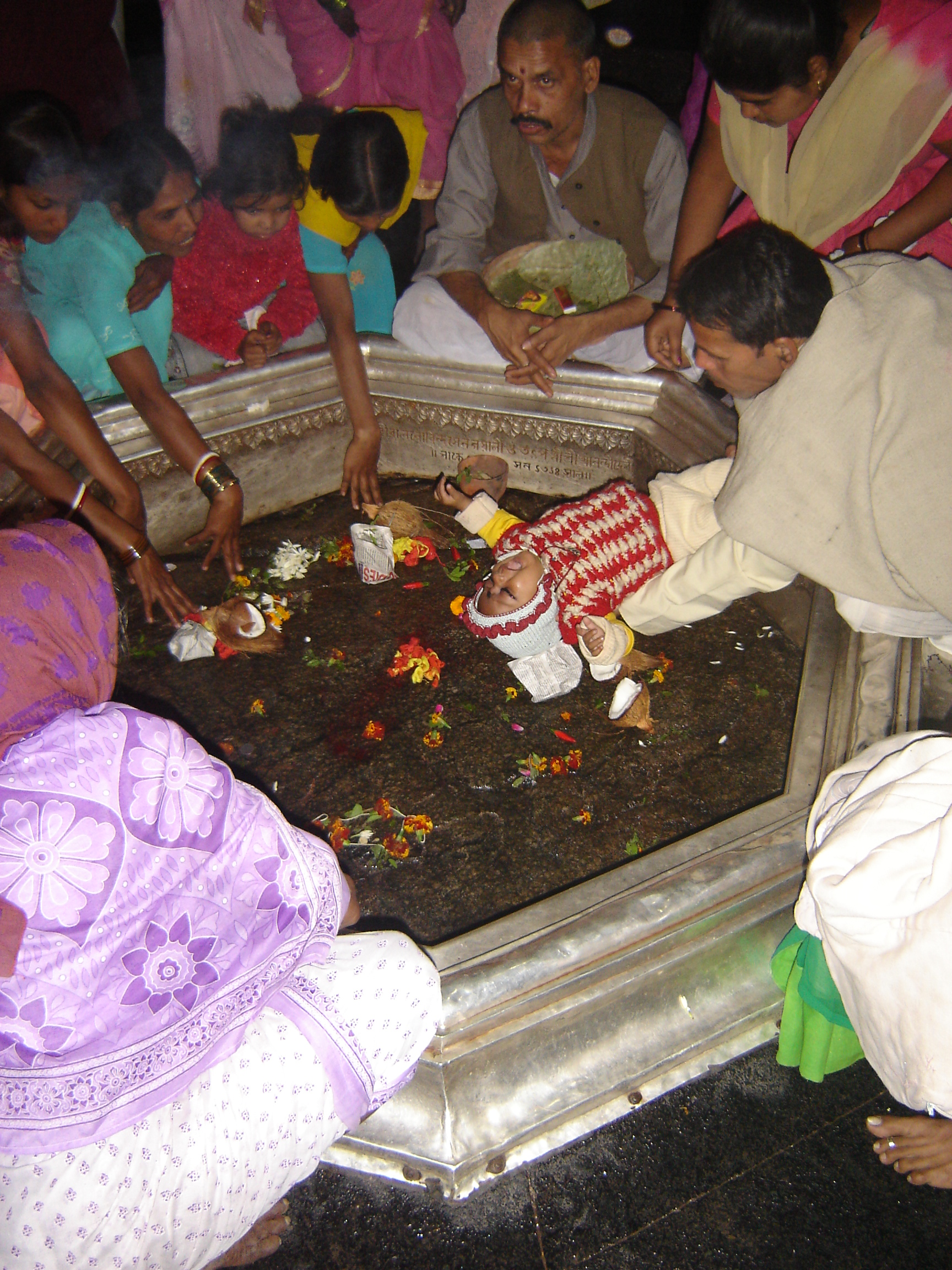
Vishnu- Pad (Vishnu feet) print inside the Vishnupada Mandir, the 40 cm long footprint of Vishnu is imprinted in solid rock and surrounded by a silver-plated basin.

Once a demon known as Gayasura, did a heavy penance and sought a boon that whoever sees him should attain salvation (Moksham). Since salvation is achieved through being righteous in one's lifetime, people started obtaining it easily. To prevent immoral people from attaining salvation Vishnu asked Gayasura to go beneath the earth and did so by placing his right foot on asura's head. After pushing Gayasura below the surface of earth, Vishnu's foot print remained on the surface that we see even today. The footprint consists of nine different symbols including Shankam, Chakram and Gadham. These are believed to be weapons of the lord. Gayasura now pushed into earth pleaded for food. Vishnu gave him a boon that every day, someone will offer him food. Whoever does so, their souls will reach heaven. The day Gayasura doesn't get food, it is believed that he will come out. Every day, one or the other from different parts of India will pray for welfare of his departed and offer food, feeding Gayasura.

The Dharmshila, a sacred stone believed to mark the exact place where Vishnu's foot first touched the earth, is closely associated with this legend. Worshiped by devotees, it is considered a place of peace and prosperity. People from different parts of India continue to pray for the welfare of their departed souls, offering food to Gayasura to ensure that he remains beneath the earth and their souls reach heaven.

== See also ==
- Religion in Bihar
