= Baigoman =

Village in Bihar

- Location within India Location within Bihar
- Coordinates: 24°45′52.6″N 84°53′54.1″E
- Country: India
- State: Bihar
- Region: Magadha
- Division: Magadh Division
- District: Gaya
- Sub District: Paraiya
- Founder: Kachhwahas

Government
  - Type: Panchayati Raj

Population (2011)
  - Total: 1,554

Languages
  - Official: Hindi
  - Spoken: Magadhi
- Time zone: UTC+5:30 (IST)
- PIN: 824209
- Telephone code: 91-631
- ISO 3166 code: IN-BR
- Vehicle registration: BR-02
- Railway Station: Gaya Junction
- Airport: Gaya International Airport
- Hospital: ANMMCH, Gaya

Baigoman is a village in Gaya district, Bihar, India. It is part of the Punakala panchayat in the Paraiya subdivision.

== History ==
The Zamindars of Baigoman and Galimapur belong to the Kachhwaha Rajput clan, originally from Rajasthan. They migrated to Galimapur, where they overthrew the ruling Muslim Zamindar and established their own Zamindari. Known for their valor and governance, they ruled the region with Rajput traditions of justice and honor. Their legacy continues through their descendants, who remain influential in social and philanthropic affairs.

Babu Raghunath Singh Ji was last zamindar of Baigoman who succeeded his father Babu Rajpati Singh Ji after his demise in 1962. He was a philanthropist and later sarpanch in Poonakala Panchayat. He was known for his lavish lifestyle. Babu Raghunath Singh of Baigoman was widely admired for his philanthropy and regal lifestyle. Known as Babu Sahab, he dedicated much of his wealth to helping the poor, funding marriages of underprivileged girls, supporting education, and providing aid to farmers in distress. His residence, Baigoman Kachahari, was a center of generosity where no one seeking help left empty-handed. Despite financial decline after the abolition of zamindari, he maintained his tradition of hospitality. His fondness for horses and elephants reflected his royal stature, while his open-door policy and kindness earned him the love and respect of generations in Gaya.

As Zamindar of Baigoman (1962–1970), he was accompanied by Shri Shlok Singh Ji, manager of Baigoman Estate during the reign of Babu Rajpati Singh Ji and Babu Raghunath Singh Ji. Babu Raghunath Singh ensured smooth land management, fair sharecropping, and justice for tenants through Baigoman Kachahari. He promoted local culture, hosted fairs, and resolved disputes within the community. After being elected Sarpanch of Paraiya (1977–1995), he shifted focus to grassroots governance. He initiated road construction, irrigation canals, and rural electrification, which improved farming and connectivity. His mediation skills prevented long court battles, strengthening village unity. Practical in approach, he combined authority with compassion, ensuring both development and harmony. His tenure remains remembered as a blend of traditional leadership and progressive rural administration.

After 18 years of hold on Gram Panchayat Election due to legal issues with Zamindars and other political policies, Government of Bihar started panchayat election in 2001.

== Notable figures ==
Babu Raghunath Singh Ji
