= Gaya, India =

City in Bihar, India

Gaya
- City
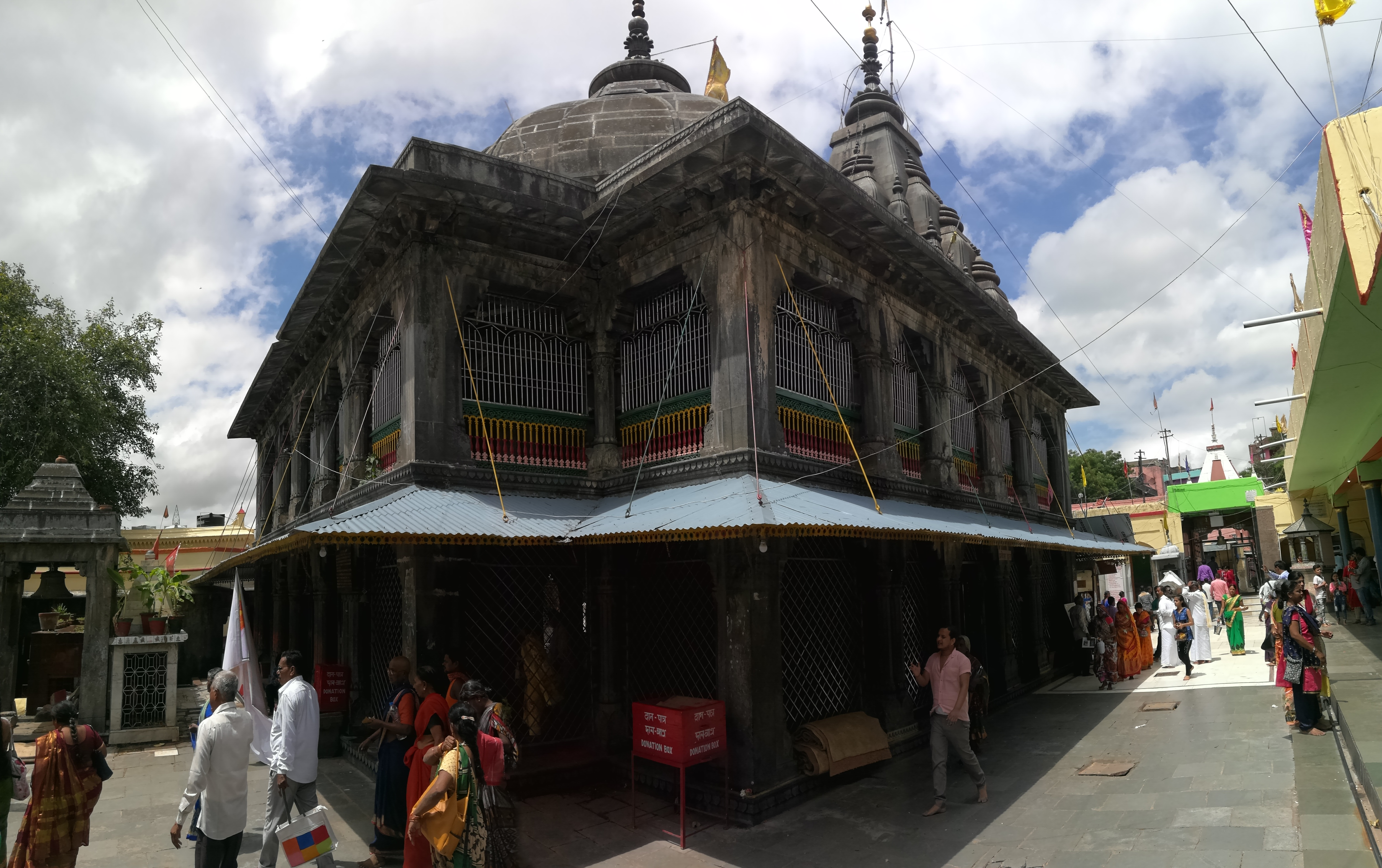
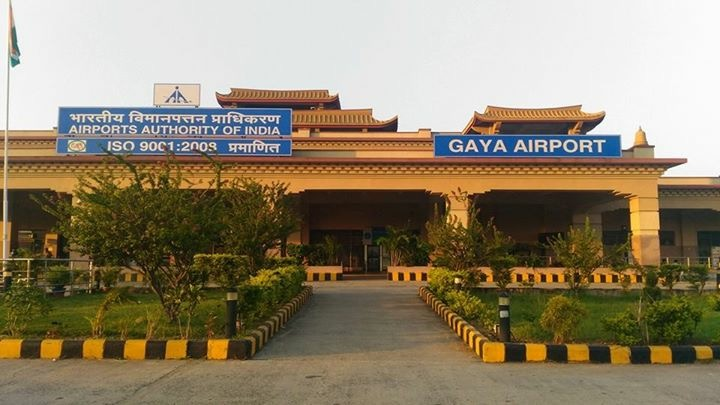
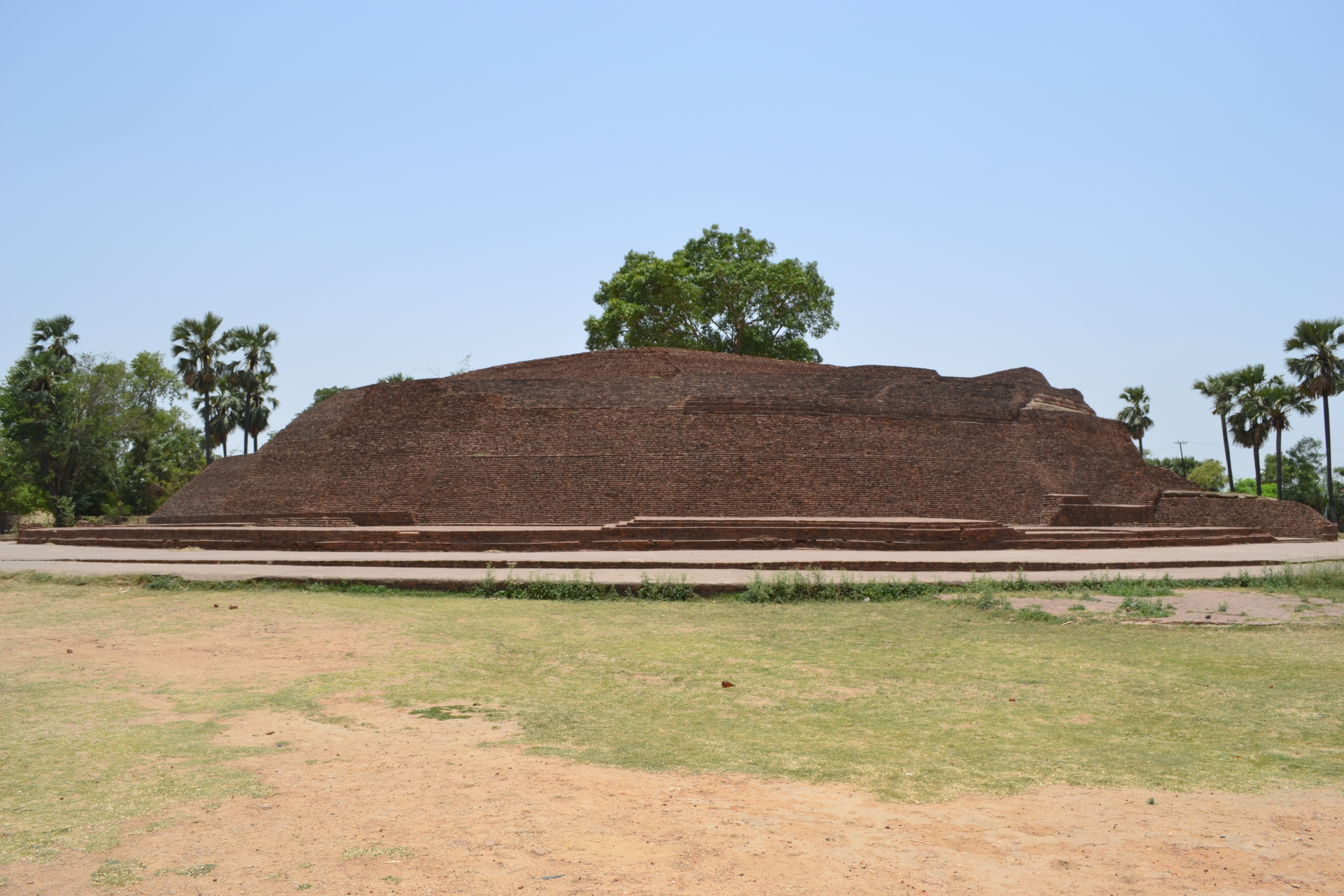
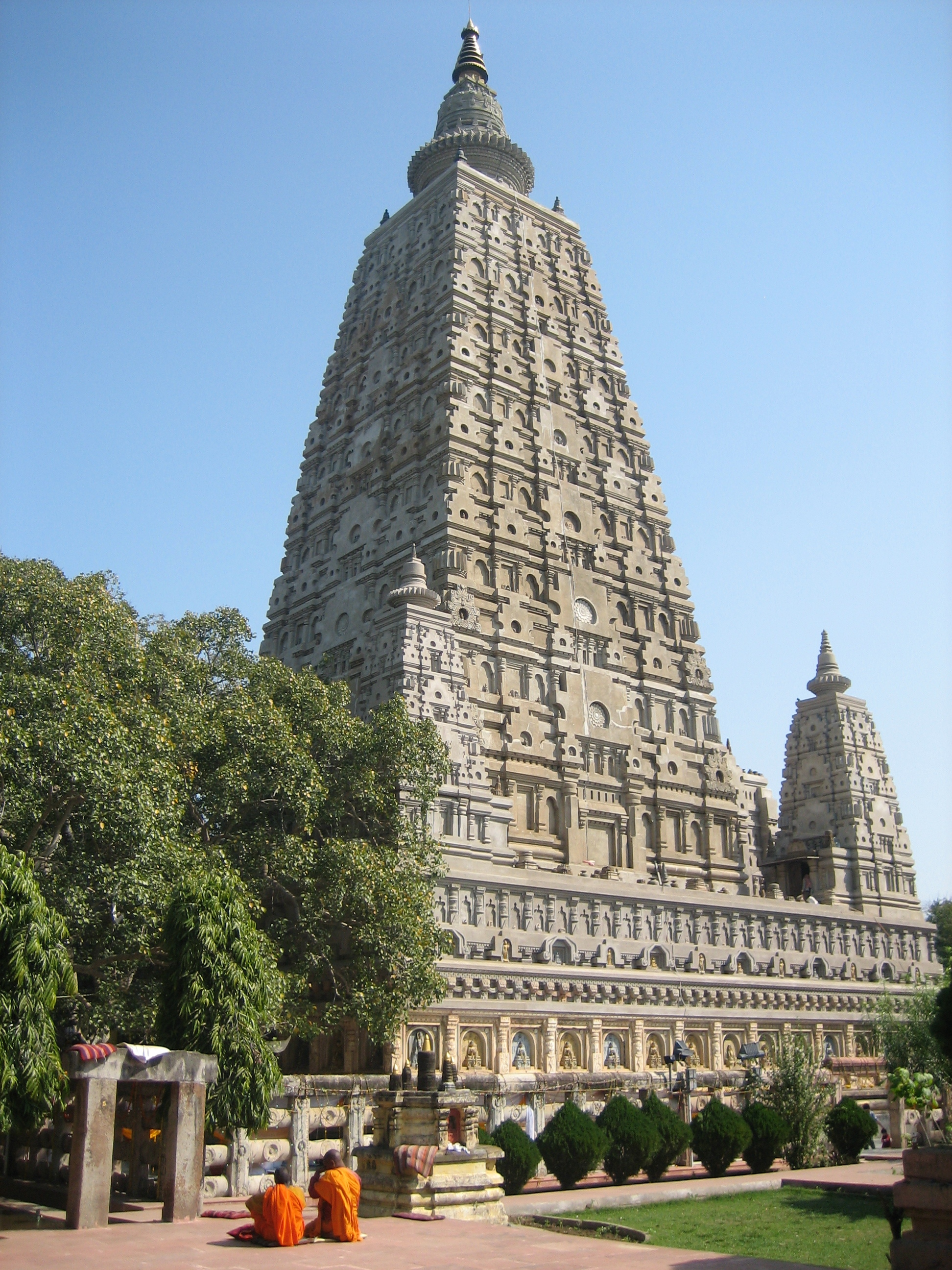
- From top: Vishnupad Temple, Gaya Airport, Sujata Stupa and Mahabodhi Temple

- Location within Bihar Location within India
- Coordinates: 24.75°N 85.01°E
- Country: India
- State: Bihar
- Region: Magadha
- Division: Magadh Division
- District: Gaya
- Named for: Gayasura

Government
  - Type: Municipal corporation
  - Body: Gaya Nagar Nigam
  - Mayor: Ganesh Paswan
  - Deputy Mayor: Mohan Shrivastava

Area
  - Total: 308 km^{2} (119 sq mi)
  - Rank: 21 (India), 3rd (Bihar)
- Elevation: 111 m (364 ft)

Population (2011)
  - Total: 470,839
  - Rank: 102 (India), 2nd (Bihar)
  - Density: 9,490/km^{2} (24,600/sq mi)
- Demonym(s): Gayaite, Gayavi, Gayawaal

Languages
  - Official: Hindi, English
  - Spoken: Magahi, Bengali, Bhojpuri, Maithili
- Time zone: UTC+5:30 (IST)
- PIN: 823001 - 13
- Telephone code: 91-631
- ISO 3166 code: IN-BR
- Vehicle registration: BR-02
- Railway Station: Gaya Junction
- Airport: Gaya International Airport
- Website: gaya.nic.in//

Gaya (IAST: Gayā) is a city, municipal corporation and the administrative headquarters of Gaya district and Magadh division of the Indian state of Bihar. Gaya is 116 kilometres (72 mi) south of Patna and is the state's second-largest city, with a population of 470,839. The city is surrounded on three sides by small, rocky hills (Mangla-Gauri, Shringa-Sthan, Ram-Shila, and Brahmayoni), with the Phalgu River on its eastern side.

It is a city of historical significance and is one of the major tourist attractions. Gaya is sanctified in the Jain, Hindu, and Buddhist religions. Gaya district is mentioned in the great epics, the Ramayana and the Mahabharata. It is the place where Rama, with Sita and Lakshmana, came to offer piṇḍadāna for their father, Dasharatha, and continues to be a major Hindu pilgrimage site for the piṇḍadāna ritual. Bodh Gaya, where Buddha is said to have attained enlightenment, is one of the four holy sites of Buddhism.

Gaya was chosen as one of twelve heritage cities to benefit from the Government of India's four-year Heritage City Development and Augmentation Yojana (HRIDAY) scheme for urban planning, economic growth and heritage conservation projects.

== Etymology ==
Gaya is named after the demon Gayasura (meaning "the demon Gaya") who dwelt the area during the Treta Yuga. According to Vayu Purana, Gaya was the name of a demon (Asura) whose body became pious after he performed strict penance and secured blessings from Vishnu. It was said that the body of Gayasura was transformed into the series of rocky hills that make up the landscape of Gaya.

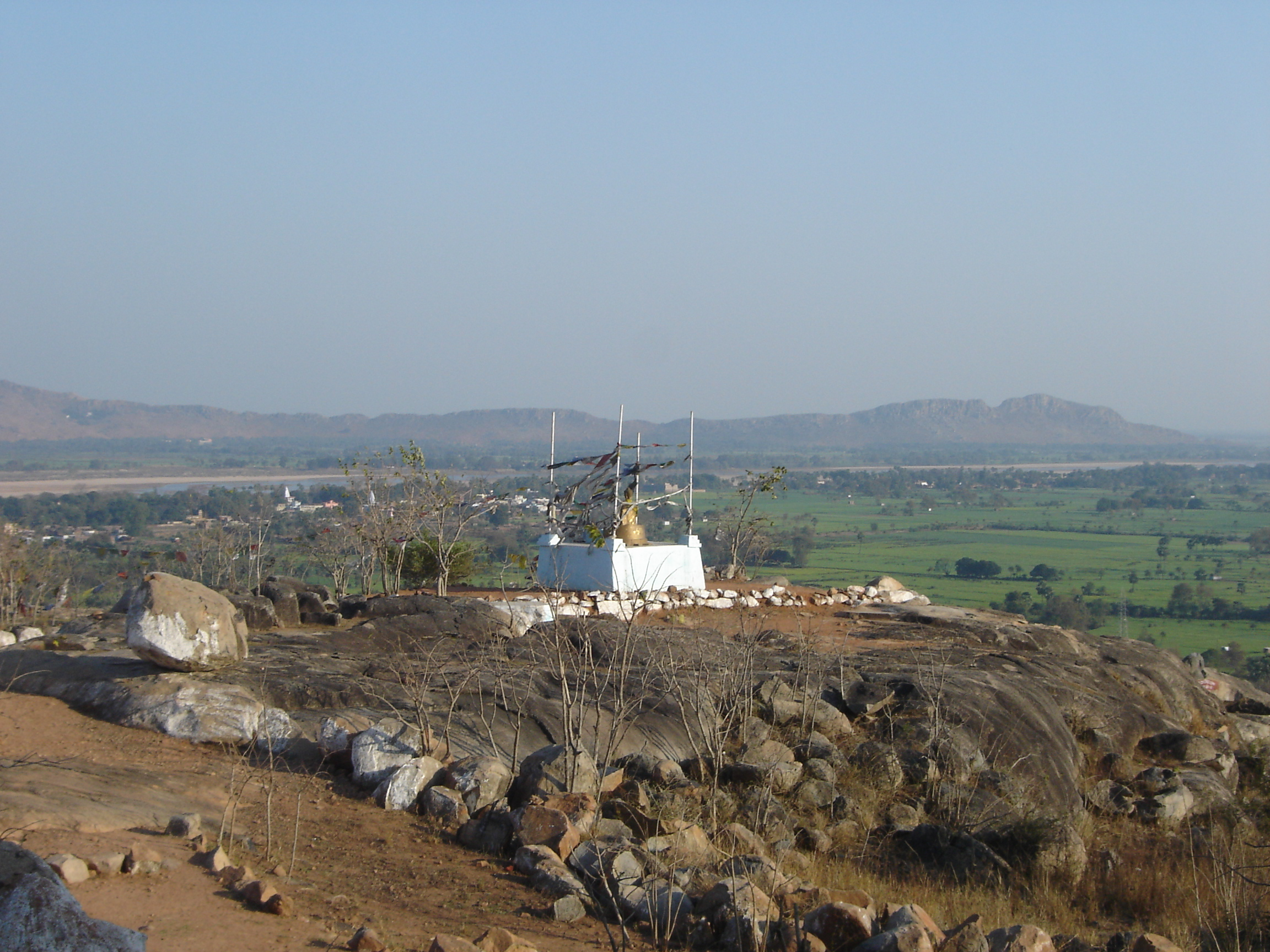
Brahmayoni Hill, where Buddha preached the Adittapariyaya Sutta (the Fire Sermon)

== History ==
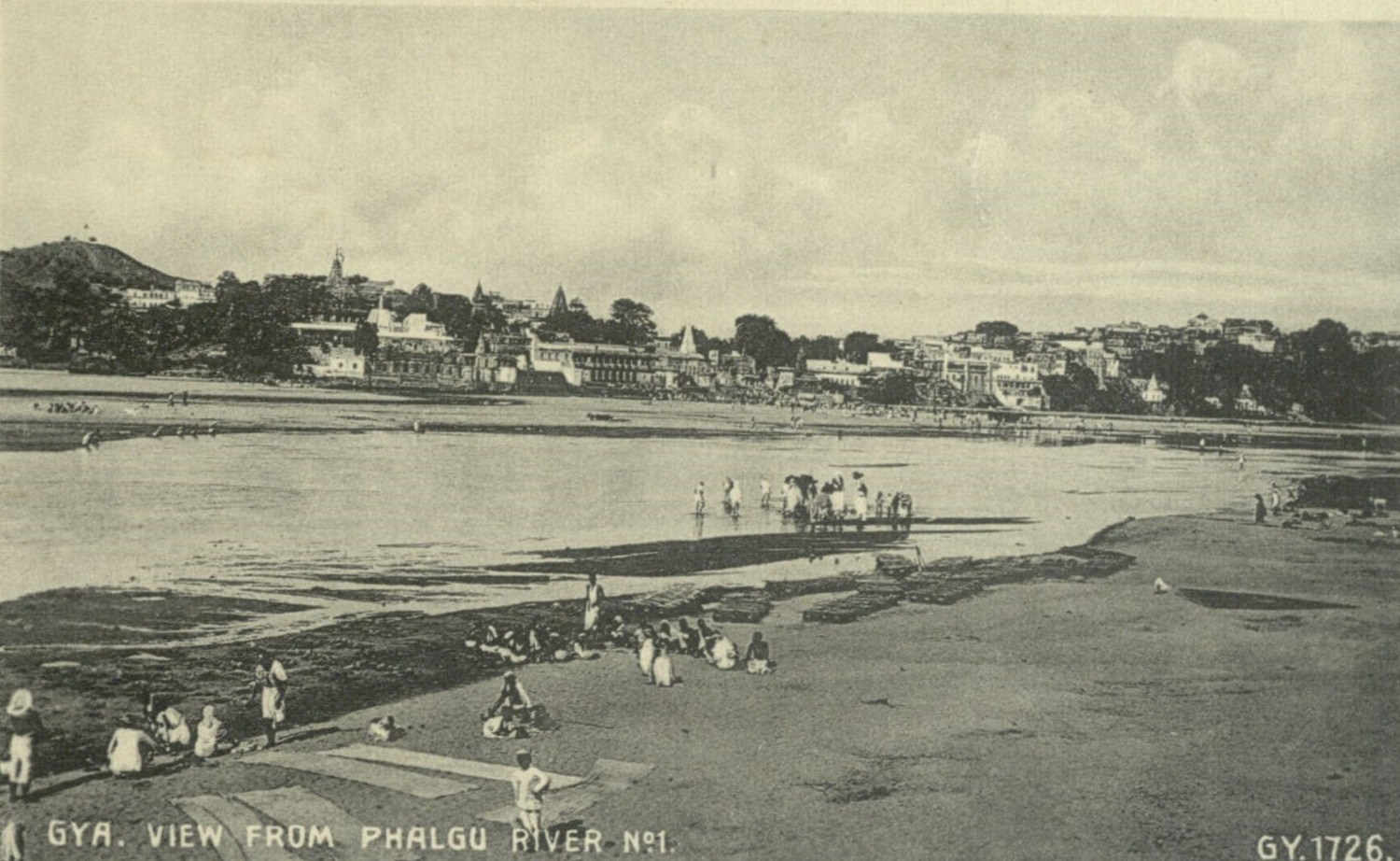
A view of Gaya during British rule, photograph taken by Waldemar Haffkine

=== Ancient history ===
Gaya is an ancient city, with a Buddhist documented history dating back to the 6th century BCE when the sage Gautama Buddha attained enlightenment at Bodh Gaya, 16 km (9.9 mi) from the modern city.

Even before this time, Gaya was a place of pilgrimage for people from around the world. The fame of ancient Gaya derived from the account in the Ramayana of the god Rama coming here to the banks of Phalgu River (called the Niranjana), accompanied by his wife and younger brother, to offer pind-daan for their father Dasharatha, for the moksha of his soul.

The city's cultural significance began with the dynasty founded by Sisunaga, who exercised power over Patna and Gaya around 600 BCE. Bimbisara, fifth king of the dynasty, who lived and ruled around 519 BCE, had projected Gaya to the outer world. Having attained an important place in the history of civilisation, the area experienced the influence of Gautama Buddha and Bhagwan Mahavir during the reign of Bimbisara. After a brief period under the Nanda dynasty (345–321 BCE), Gaya and the entire Magadha region came under Mauryan rule. Mauryan Emperor Ashoka (272–232 BCE) embraced and promoted Buddhism. He visited Gaya, and built the first temple at Bodh Gaya to commemorate the Buddha's attainment of supreme enlightenment.

=== Modern history ===
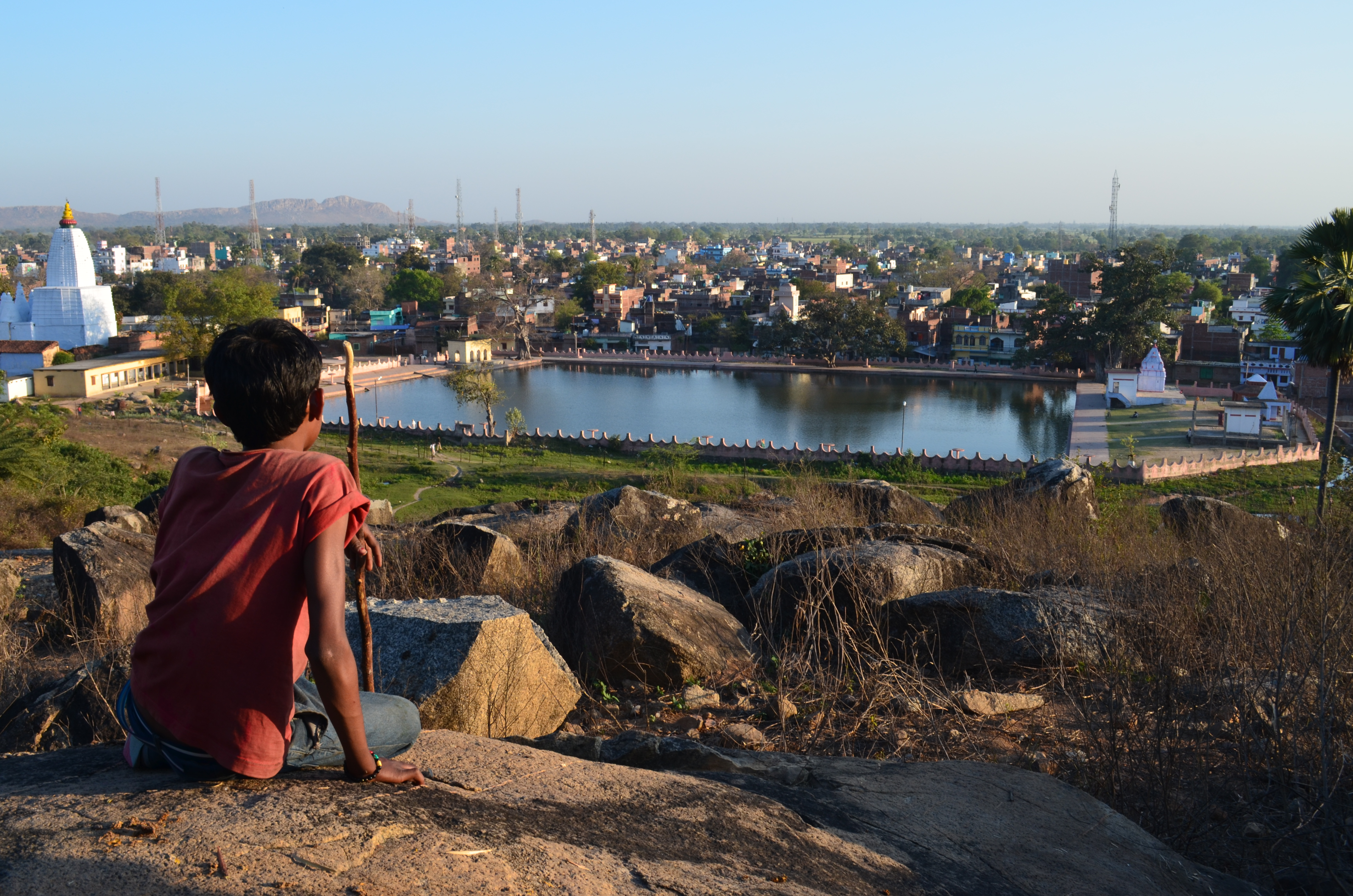
View of Gaya from Hills of Mangla Gauri

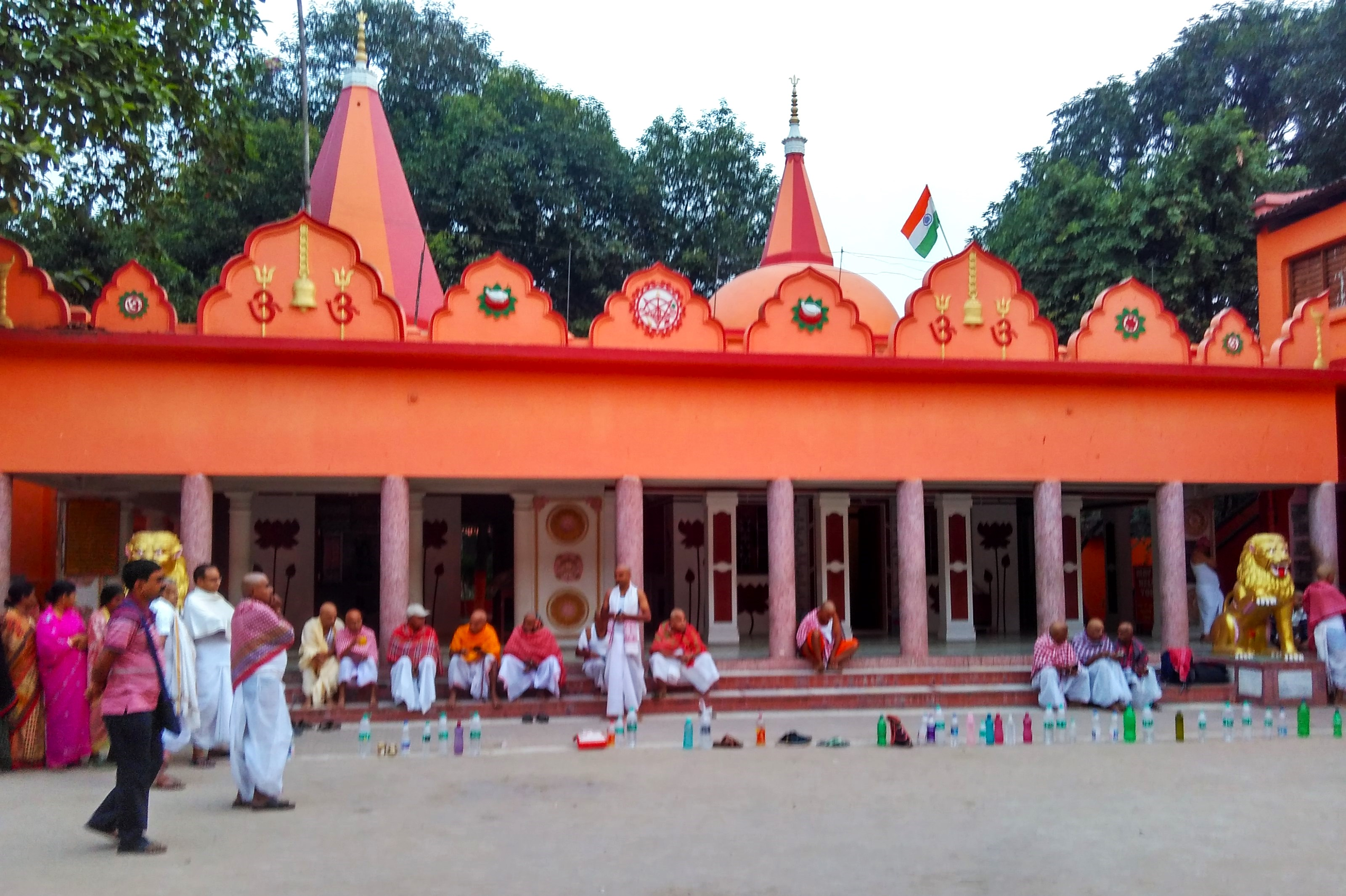
Bharat Sevashram Sangha temple, Gaya

As attested by Francis Buchanan-Hamilton in the early nineteenth century, the city was divided into two areas: a sacred area in the southern part of the city, called Gaya; and the larger secular area, which may have been known by the Muslim community as Allahabad. During the British rule, the commercial and administrative area of the secular zone was formally named Saheb Ganj by British policy reformer Thomas Law, who was a district officer in Gaya in the late nineteenth century. Now 2023 Upgrade Gaya Junction to International Junction official news launched By @PIB_Patna on Twitter

Gaya played a significant role in the Indian Independence Movement. From 26 to 31 December 1922, the 37th session of the Indian National Congress was held in Gaya under the presidency of Deshbandhu Chittaranjan Das. It was attended by prominent leaders and luminaries of the Independence Movement, including Mohandas K. Gandhi, Rajendra Prasad, Anugrah Narayan Sinha, Sardar Patel, Maulana Azad, Jawaharlal Nehru and Krishna Sinha.

The new Vishnupad Corridor Project is underway to improve pilgrim experience at Vishnupad.

== Administration ==
Until 1864, Gaya was a part of the district of Bihar and Ramgarh (now in the state of Jharkhand). It became a district of Bihar in its own right on 3 October 1865. In May 1981, the Bihar state government created the Magadh division, comprising the district of Gaya, along with Nawada, Aurangabad and Jehanabad, all of which had originally been sub-divisions when Gaya district was created. Aurangabad and Nawada were partitioned from the territory of Gaya in 1973; and Jehanabad in 1988. Gaya district occupies an area of 4,976 km^{2} (1,921-mile^{2}).

Gaya Municipal Corporation (GMC) is the civic body that governs Gaya. GMC consists of democratically elected members, is headed by a mayor, who administer the city's infrastructure, public services, and supplies.

== Culture ==
=== Pilgrimage ===
The city of Gaya is a holy place of Hinduism, with a great number of Hindu deities represented in the engravings, paintings and carvings of its shrines. Of particular importance are the sites in the city associated with Vishnu, in particular the Phalgu River and the shrine Vishnupad Mandir, or Vishnupada, which is marked by a large footprint of Lord Vishnu engraved in a basalt block. Gaya is the location at which Rama, with Sita and Lakshmana, offered pind-daan for his father, Dasharatha. Gaya has since remained a site of key importance for the performance of the pind-daan ritual.

Nearby Bodh Gaya ("Buddha Gaya"), so named to distinguish it from the Hindu town centre of Gaya, is one of the four holiest sites of Buddhism and the site where the Buddha attained enlightenment.

=== World Heritage Site at Bodh Gaya ===
The Mahabodhi Temple Complex at Bodh Gaya was listed as a World Heritage Site by the World Heritage Committee of the United Nations Educational, Scientific and Cultural Organization (UNESCO) at its 26th session, on 26 June 2002.

The 50-metre-high (160 ft) Mahabodhi Temple central to the complex was first built by the emperor Ashoka in the 3rd century BCE. The main part of the present structure dates from the 5th–6th centuries CE. It is one of the earliest and best-preserved Buddhist temples built entirely of brick dating from the later Gupta period. The Bodhi Tree (Ficus religiosa), the most important of the sacred places within the complex, is reputedly a descendant of the original tree under which Siddhārtha Gautama attained enlightenment and became the Buddha. Marking this seminal moment, Bodh Gaya is one of the four holiest pilgrimage sites of Buddhism, with Lumbini, Sarnath and Kushinagar.

The various structures on the site have undergone a number of restorations over the centuries. Ongoing maintenance and management is required to protect the complex which, as a major pilgrimage site, is under pressure due to large numbers of visitors. The site is under the responsibility of the state government of Bihar, and is managed by the Bodhgaya Temple Management Committee (BTMC) and advisory board under the Bodh Gaya Temple Act, 1949.

== Climate ==
As Gaya is surrounded by hills on three sides and river on the fourth side, the climate of Gaya is seasonable. Climate is characterised by relatively high temperatures and evenly distributed rainfall throughout the year. The Köppen Climate Classification sub-type for this climate is "Cwa" (humid subtropical).

Climate data for Gaya (1991–2020, extremes 1901–2020)
Month	Jan	Feb	Mar	Apr	May	Jun	Jul	Aug	Sep	Oct	Nov	Dec	Year
Record high °C (°F)	31.7 (89.1)	36.1 (97.0)	42.1 (107.8)	45.0 (113.0)	47.1 (116.8)	47.9 (118.2)	43.7 (110.7)	42.3 (108.1)	42.3 (108.1)	37.2 (99.0)	35.0 (95.0)	31.1 (88.0)	47.9 (118.2)
Mean daily maximum °C (°F)	22.9 (73.2)	26.8 (80.2)	32.8 (91.0)	38.7 (101.7)	39.8 (103.6)	37.8 (100.0)	33.6 (92.5)	33.0 (91.4)	32.5 (90.5)	31.7 (89.1)	28.9 (84.0)	24.7 (76.5)	31.9 (89.4)
Daily mean °C (°F)	15.5 (59.9)	19.4 (66.9)	24.9 (76.8)	30.5 (86.9)	33.2 (91.8)	32.3 (90.1)	29.5 (85.1)	29.2 (84.6)	28.8 (83.8)	26.1 (79.0)	21.6 (70.9)	16.8 (62.2)	25.7 (78.2)
Mean daily minimum °C (°F)	8.4 (47.1)	11.7 (53.1)	16.2 (61.2)	21.9 (71.4)	25.5 (77.9)	26.6 (79.9)	25.7 (78.3)	25.6 (78.1)	24.6 (76.3)	20.7 (69.3)	14.4 (57.9)	9.7 (49.5)	19.2 (66.6)
Record low °C (°F)	1.5 (34.7)	2.7 (36.9)	7.8 (46.0)	12.9 (55.2)	17.1 (62.8)	18.3 (64.9)	16.7 (62.1)	18.5 (65.3)	17.4 (63.3)	12.2 (54.0)	6.1 (43.0)	1.4 (34.5)	1.4 (34.5)
Average rainfall mm (inches)	13.6 (0.54)	13.9 (0.55)	12.2 (0.48)	10.3 (0.41)	35.3 (1.39)	155.2 (6.11)	273.2 (10.76)	267.4 (10.53)	179.5 (7.07)	53.2 (2.09)	8.5 (0.33)	3.2 (0.13)	1,025.5 (40.37)
Average rainy days	1.2	1.3	1.3	0.9	2.4	6.6	12.9	13.5	8.7	2.4	0.5	0.3	52.2
Average relative humidity (%) (at 17:30 IST)	56	48	32	25	36	54	75	76	76	68	59	58	55
Source 1: India Meteorological Department
Source 2: Tokyo Climate Center (mean temperatures 1991–2020)

Gaya has been ranked 8th best "National Clean Air City" under (Category 2 3-10L Population cities) in India.

== Economy ==
Gaya is the second-largest contributor to the economy of Bihar, after Patna. Agriculture is the leading economic activity of the district. The main crops grown are rice, wheat, potatoes, and lentils. Livestock raised include cattle, buffaloes, goats and pigs. Gaya has a large number of household industries, producing incense sticks (atagarbatti), local sweets tilkut (made with sesame seed) and lai (made with poppy seed), stone-work, hand weaving, power-loom weaving, textiles and garments, small-scale manufactured goods, and plastic products. Small-scale industries also include agricultural services, metalworking, machinery and equipment production and repair services. The main vegetable market in the city is the Kedarnath Market. Commercial activities are located along its main roads; the city also has a large number of informal shops. As Gaya is an important centre of religious tourism, accommodation is widely available.

== Transportation ==
=== Roadways ===
Gaya has a road network providing good connectivity with the state of Bihar and other parts of the country. Regular direct bus services run from Gaya to Patna, Aurangabad, Bhagalpur, Munger, Nalanda, Rajgir, Varanasi, Ranchi, Jamshedpur, Hazaribagh, Bardhaman, Durgapur, Asansol, Kolkata, Lucknow and Dhanbad. In 2011, A/C Mercedes-Benz luxury services were introduced by Bihar State Road Transport Corporation for Muzaffarpur, Patna, Munger, Bhagalpur, Hazaribagh, Koderma, Ranchi and Ramgarh.

The Grand Trunk Road from Kolkata to Delhi passes from "Dobhi & Barachatti"some 30 km (19 mi) from Gaya. This road, known as National Highway 2 before 2010, is now called National Highway 19. It connects Gaya to Patna, Dhanbad, Ranchi, Jamshedpur, Bokaro, Rourkela, Durgapur, Kolkata (495 km), Varanasi (252 km), Prayagraj, Kanpur, Delhi, Amritsar, and to the Pakistani cities of Lahore and Peshawar. Gaya is connected to Patna (105 km) by National Highway 22 (formerly NH 83), and to Nawada, Rajgir (78 km) and Bihar Sharif by NH 120. Construction work began in 2014 on the road from Patna to Dobhi via Gaya and Gaya to Bihar Sharif to create a four-lane highway with additional road and bridge infrastructure. Completion of the project, originally due in April 2018, has been delayed. the first expressway of bihar Amas-Darbhanga Expressway is starting from a nearby village Amas, construction started from late 2020.

=== Railways ===
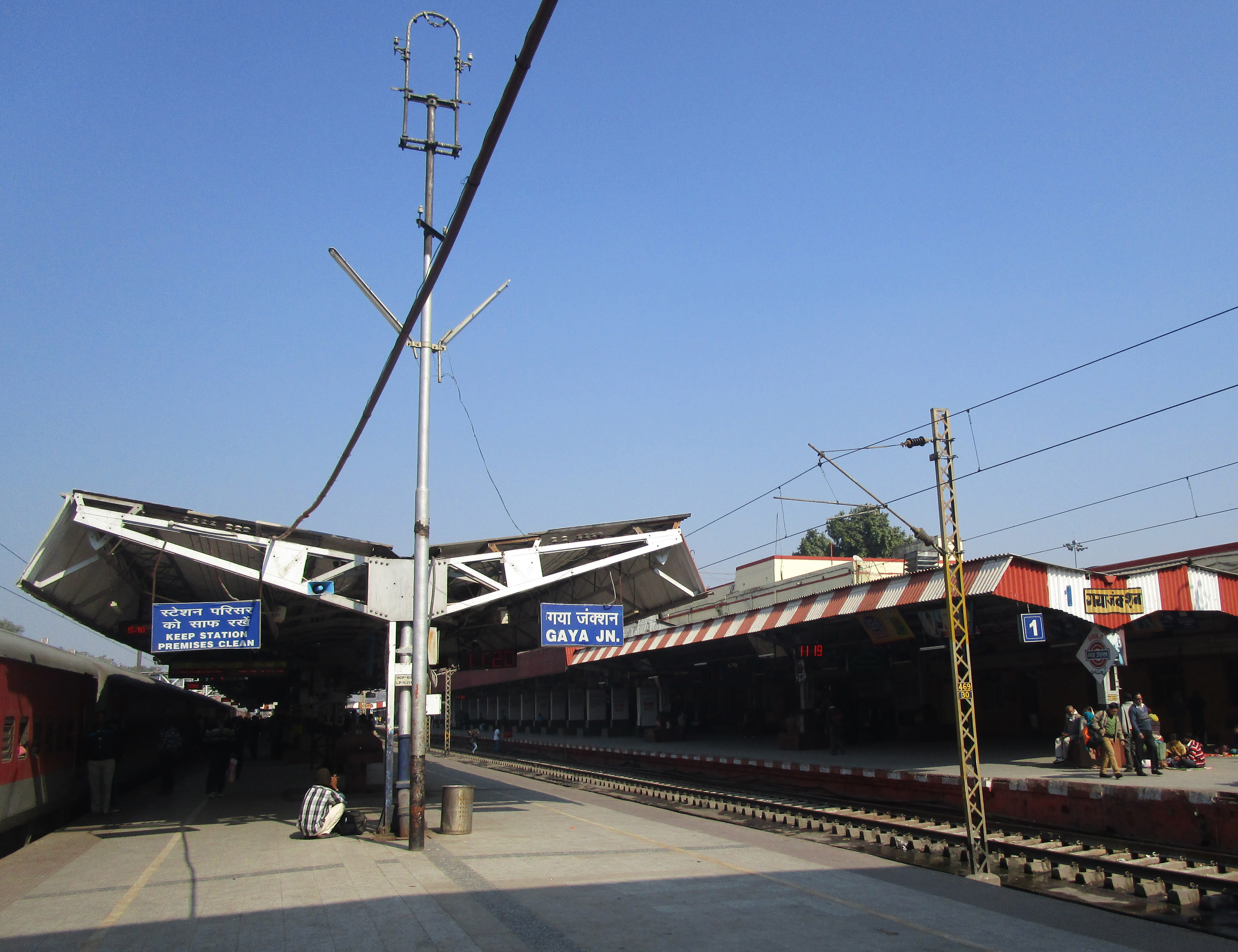
Gaya Junction

Gaya is connected to the rest of India by roads, rail and airways. The Grand Chord section of the Indian Railways passes through Gaya. Gaya Junction railway station railway station is a major junction station serving the city. Gaya Junction has been redeveloped as Model railway station recently and houses all the major facilities like waiting rooms, computerised reservation facility, food plaza, dormitory, retiring rooms, cafeteria, bookshop, etc. Gaya falls under the jurisdiction of the Pandit Deen Dayal Upadhyaya railway division of the East Central Railway zone. The Grand Chord rail line that connects Howrah and New Delhi passes through Gaya. It lies between Pandit Deen Dayal Upadhyaya Junction on the Delhi side and Dhanbad Junction on the Howrah side. It is located at 24°48′13″N 84°59′57″E. It has an elevation of 117 metres (384 ft).

=== Airways ===
Situated between Gaya (7 km) and Bodh Gaya (11 km), Gaya Airport is one of two operating international airports in the states of Bihar and Jharkhand. Gaya airport mainly operates weekly and seasonal flights for Buddhist pilgrims to Bodh Gaya from Colombo, Sri Lanka; Bangkok, Thailand, Singapore, Paro and Bhutan. There are also regular domestic flights to Kolkata and Delhi. IndiGo has started Domestic Flights to New Delhi and Kolkata. The Airports Authority of India has plans to develop Gaya Airport as a stand-by to the Netaji Subhash Chandra Bose International Airport in Kolkata.

== Religious sites ==
- Vishnupad Mandir – Located on the banks of the Phalgu River, this temple is dedicated to Vishnu. It is believed to be the spot where Vishnu subdued the demon Gayasura. A 40 cm footprint said to be of Vishnu, known as Dharmasila, is enshrined within the temple. The structure was rebuilt in 1787 by Queen Ahilyabai Holkar.
- Bodhi Tree – At the Mahabodhi Temple complex the Bodhi Tree is believed to be a descendant of the original tree under which the Buddha attained enlightenment. Pilgrims meditate and worship here.
- Mangala Gauri Temple – A Shakti Peetha located on the Mangalagauri Hill in Gaya. It is believed to be the seat of the Hindu goddess (Sati) and is one of the 18 Maha Shakti Peethas.

== Demographics ==
Religions in Gaya City (2011)
Religion	Percent
Hinduism	79.43%
Islam	19.65%
Christianity	0.26%
Jainism	0.24%
Others†	1.42%
Distribution of religions †Includes Sikhs (0.09%), Buddhists (0.02%).

The city had its first census in 1872, which placed the figure at 66,843. In the 2011 census, the Gaya Urban Agglomeration had a population of 470,839. The Gaya Urban Agglomeration encompasses the Gaya Municipal Corporation, Kaler (Out Growth), and Paharpur (Census Town). the Gaya Municipal Corporation had a total population of 468,614, of whom 247,572 were male and 221,042 were female. The population below 5 years was 59,669. The sex ratio was 986 women to 1000 men. The literacy rate for the population aged 7 and over was 85.74%.

== Sub Towns ==
- Keori, between Gaya and Patna
- Barachatti
- Sherghati
- Tekari
- Bodhgaya
- Gurua
- Guraru
- Wazirganj
- Dumariya
- Aatri

== Education ==
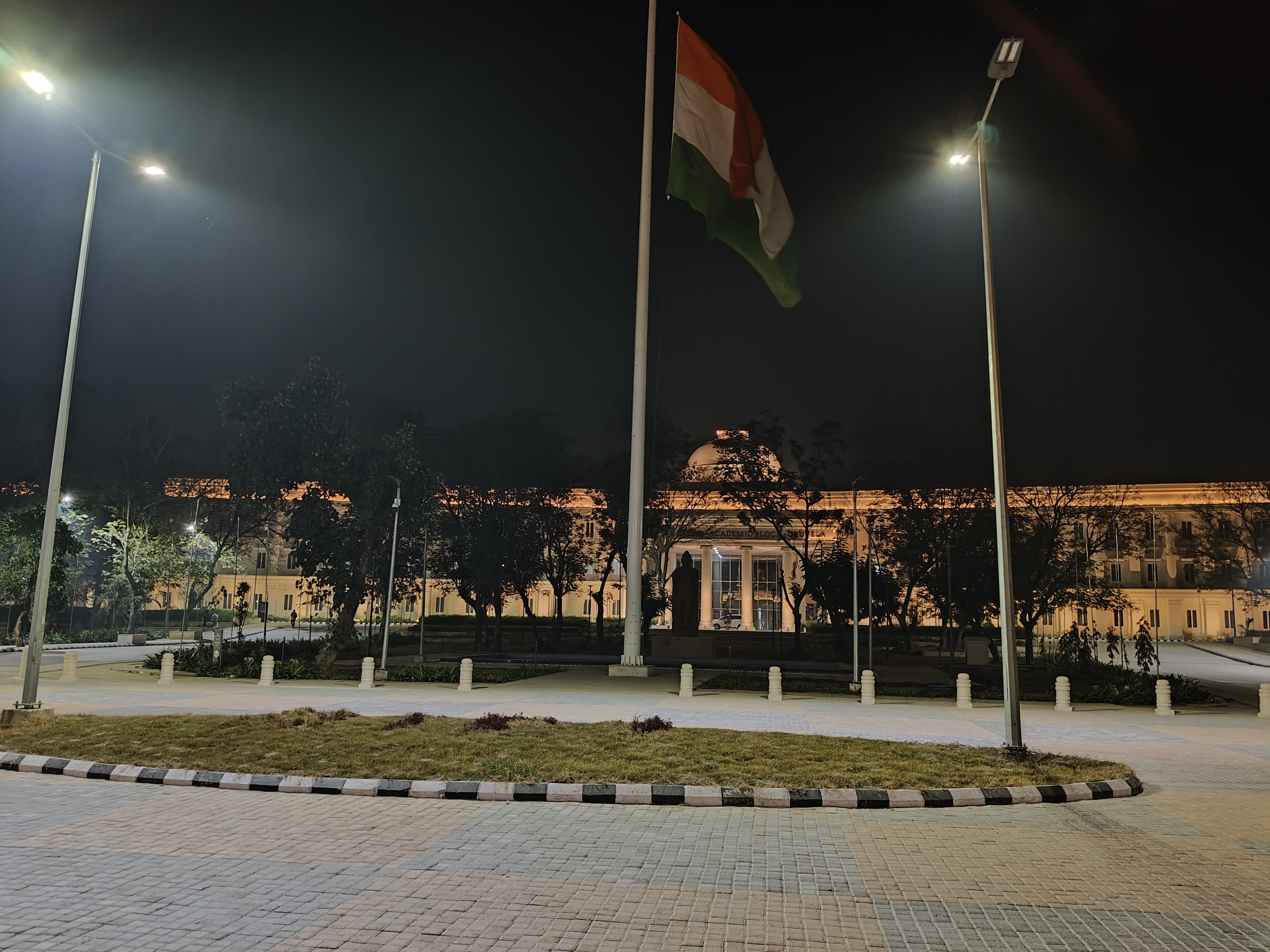
Academic Building of 'IIM Bodhgaya'

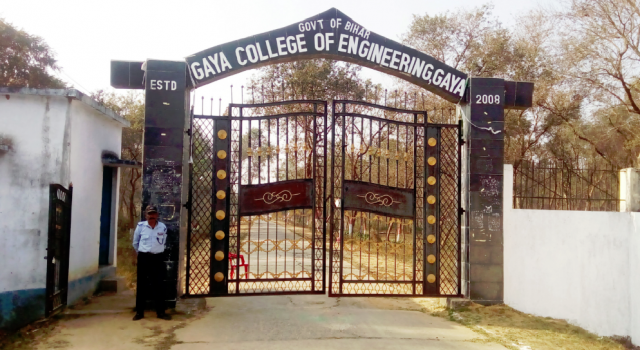
Entrance Gate Of GCE Campus

Govt. Training Centres

- Officer's Training Academy, Gaya

Notable Institutions of Higher Education include:

- Central University of South Bihar
- Indian Institute of Management Bodh Gaya
- Anugrah Narayan Magadh Medical College and Hospital
- Magadh University

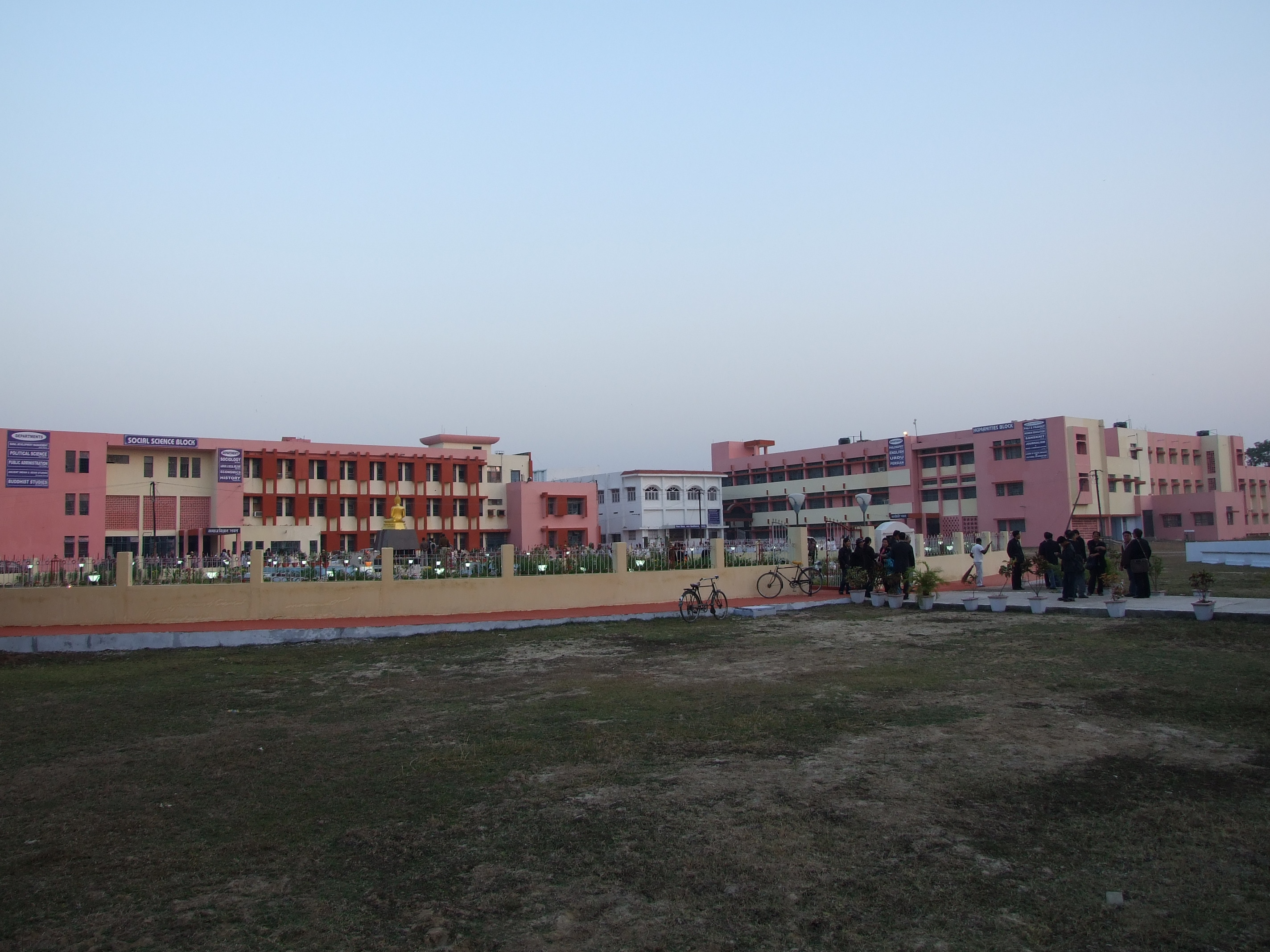

Notable colleges:

- Gaya College
- Gaya College of Engineering
- Mirza Ghalib College

Notable schools:

- Nazareth Academy, Gaya

== Notable people ==
- Gautam Buddha
- Rajesh Kumar
- Anugrah Narayan Sinha
- Jitan Ram Manjhi
- Eqbal Ahmad
- Satyapal Chandra
- Seyed E. Hasnain
- Ashutosh Aman
- Tabish Khair
- Babu Raghunath Singh Baigoman
- Prem Kumar (politician)
- A. K. Narain
- Lalit Mohan Sharma
- Janki Ballabh Shastri
- O. P. Singh
- Abhay Kushwaha
- Lilliput (actor)
- Rajendra Prasad Yadav (Atri politician)
- Surendra Prasad Yadav
- Abu Bakr Ahmed Haleem
- Hussain Ul Haque

== See also ==
- Pind Daan
- Pitru Paksha
- Phalgu River
- Akshayavat
