= Patna–Gaya Passenger =

Passenger train in India

Overview
- Service type: Express
- First service: 18 July 2013; 12 years ago
- Current operator: East Central Railway zone

Route
- Termini: Patna Junction (PNBE); Gaya Junction (GAYA)
- Stops: 23
- Distance travelled: 92 km (57 mi)
- Average journey time: 3h 15m
- Service frequency: Daily (Note: Runs seven days in a week for every direction.)
- Train number: 53213/53214

On-board services
- Class: General Unreserved
- Seating arrangements: Yes
- Sleeping arrangements: No
- Catering facilities: No
- Observation facilities: ICF coach
- Entertainment facilities: No
- Baggage facilities: No
- Other facilities: Below the seats

Technical
- Rolling stock: 2
- Track gauge: 1,676 mm (5 ft 6 in)
- Operating speed: 30 km/h (19 mph), including halts

The Patna–Gaya Passenger is an express train belonging to East Central Railway zone that runs between Patna Junction and Gaya Junction in India. It is currently being operated with 53213/53214 train numbers on a daily basis.

== Service ==
The 53213/Patna–Gaya Passenger has an average speed of 30 km/h and covers 92 km in 3h 5m. The 53214/Gaya–Patna Passenger has an average speed of 29 km/h and covers 92 km in 3h 10m.

== Route and halts ==
The important halts of the train are:

- Patna Junction
- Parsa Bazar
- Ramgovindsingh Mahuli Halt
- Punpun Ghat Halt
- Punpun
- Jehanabad
- Jehanabad Court
- Makhdumpur Gaya
- Bela
- Ore Halt
- Chakand
- Gaya Junction

== Coach composition ==
The train has standard ICF rakes with a maximum speed of 110 km/h. The train consists of 14 coaches:

- 12 General
- 2 Seating cum Luggage Rake

== Traction ==
Both trains are hauled by a Mughal Sarai Loco Shed-based WAM-4 electric locomotive from Patna to Gaya and vice versa.

== Rake sharing ==
The train shares its rake with

- 13249/13250 Patna–Bhabua Road Intercity Express
- 13243/13244 Patna–Bhabua Road Intercity Express (via Gaya)
- 53211/53212 Patna–Sasaram Passenger

== See also ==
- Patna Junction railway station
- Bhabua Road railway station
- Patna–Bhabua Road Intercity Express (via Gaya)
- Patna–Bhabua Road Intercity Express
- Patna–Sasaram Passenger
