= Rajgir–Patna Intercity Express =

Train in India

Rajgir - Patna Intercity Express

Overview
- Service type: Express
- Status: Active
- Locale: Bihar
- First service: 6 April 2026; 2 months ago
- Current operator: East Central Railway (ECR)

Route
- Termini: Rajgir (RGD); Patna Junction (PNBE)
- Stops: 13
- Distance travelled: 99 km (62 mi)
- Average journey time: 3h 55m
- Service frequency: Daily
- Train number: 13353 / 13354

On-board services
- Classes: General Unreserved, Sleeper Class, AC 3rd Class, AC 2nd Class
- Seating arrangements: Yes
- Sleeping arrangements: Yes
- Catering facilities: No
- Observation facilities: Large windows
- Baggage facilities: No
- Other facilities: Below the seats

Technical
- Rolling stock: LHB coach
- Track gauge: 1,676 mm (5 ft 6 in)
- Electrification: 25 kV 50 Hz AC Overhead line
- Operating speed: 130 km/h (81 mph) maximum, 25 km/h (16 mph) average including halts.
- Track owner: Indian Railways

The 13353 / 13354 Rajgir–Patna Intercity Express is an express train belonging to East Central Railway zone that runs between the city Rajgir to Patna Junction of Bihar in India.

It operates as train number 13353 from Rajgir to Patna Junction and as train number 13354 in the reverse direction, serving the state of Bihar.

== Services ==
• 13353/ Rajgir–Patna Intercity Express has an average speed of 25 km/h and covers 99 km in 3h 55m.

• 13354/ Patna–Rajgir Intercity Express has an average speed of 29 km/h and covers 99 km in 3h 25m.

== Routes and halts ==
The Important Halts of the train are :

● Rajgir

● Nalanda

● Bihar Sharif Junction

● Wena

● Harnaut

● Bakhtiyarpur Junction

● Karauta

● Khusropur

● Fatuha Junction

● Patna Sahib

● Gulzarbagh

● Rajendra Nagar Terminal

● Patna Junction

== Schedule ==
• 13353 - 3:10 PM (Daily) [Rajgir]

• 13354 - 9:20 AM (Daily) [Patna Junction]

== Coach composition ==
1. General Unreserved - 9
2. Sleeper Class - 7
3. AC 3rd Class - 4
4. AC 2nd Class - 2

== Traction ==
As the entire route is fully electrified, it is hauled by a Kanpur Loco Shed-based WAP-7 electric locomotive from Valsad to Dahod and vice versa.

== Rake share ==
The train will Rake Shares as follows :

1. Dhanbad–Patna Intercity Express (13331/13332)

2. Singrauli–Patna Express (13349/13350)

3. Palamu Express (13347/13348)

== See also ==
Trains from Rajgir :

1. Rajgir–Mumbai LTT Janta Express
2. Azimabad Express
3. Shramjeevi Superfast Express
4. Budhpurnima Express
5. Rajgir–Danapur MEMU

Trains from Patna Junction :

1. Vasco da Gama–Patna Superfast Express
2. Patna–Ranchi Vande Bharat Express
3. Patna–Ranchi Jan Shatabdi Express
4. Archana Express
5. Patna–Kota Express

== Notes ==
a. Runs daily in a week with both directions.
