= Patna–Bhabua Road Intercity Express (via Gaya) =

Train in India

Overview
- Service type: Express
- Current operator: East Central Railway zone

Route
- Termini: Patna Junction (PNBE); Bhabua Road (BBU)
- Stops: 22
- Distance travelled: 243 km (151 mi)
- Average journey time: 6h
- Service frequency: Daily (Note: Runs seven days in a week for every direction.)
- Train number: 13249/13250

On-board services
- Class: General Unreserved
- Seating arrangements: Yes
- Sleeping arrangements: No
- Catering facilities: No
- Observation facilities: LHB coach
- Entertainment facilities: No
- Baggage facilities: No
- Other facilities: Below the seats

Technical
- Rolling stock: 2
- Track gauge: 1,676 mm (5 ft 6 in)
- Operating speed: 40 km/h (25 mph), including halts

The Patna–Bhabua Road Intercity Express is an Express train belonging to East Central Railway zone that runs between Patna Junction and Bhabua Road in India. It is currently being operated with 13243/13244 train numbers on a daily basis.

== Service ==
The 13243/Patna–Bhabua Road InterCity Express has an average speed of 40 km/h and covers 243 km in 6h. The 13244/Bhabua Road–Patna InterCity Express Express has an average speed of 42 km/h and covers 243 km in 5h 45m.

== Route and halts ==
The important halts of the train are:

- Patna Junction
- Punpun
- Pothahi
- Jehanabad
- Makhdumpur Gaya
- Bela
- Gaya Junction
- Paraiya
- Guraru
- Ismailpur
- Rafiganj
- Anugraha Narayan Road
- Son Nagar Junction
- Dehri-on-Sone
- Sasaram Junction
- Kudra
- Bhabua Road

== Coach composition ==
The train has standard ICF rakes with a maximum speed of 110 km/h. The train consists of 14 coaches:

- 12 General
- 2 Seating cum Luggage Rake

== Traction ==
Both trains are hauled by a Mughal Sarai Loco Shed-based WAP-4 electric locomotive from Patna to Bhabua Road and vice versa.

== Rake sharing ==
The trains shares its rake with

- 13249/13250 Patna–Bhabua Road Intercity Express
- 53213/53214 Patna–Gaya Passenger
- 53211/53212 Patna–Sasaram Passenger

== See also ==
- Patna Junction railway station
- Bhabua Road railway station
- Patna–Bhabua Road Intercity Express
- Patna–Gaya Passenger
- Patna–Sasaram Passenger
