= Bihta railway station =

Railway station in Patna, Bihar, India

BIHTA

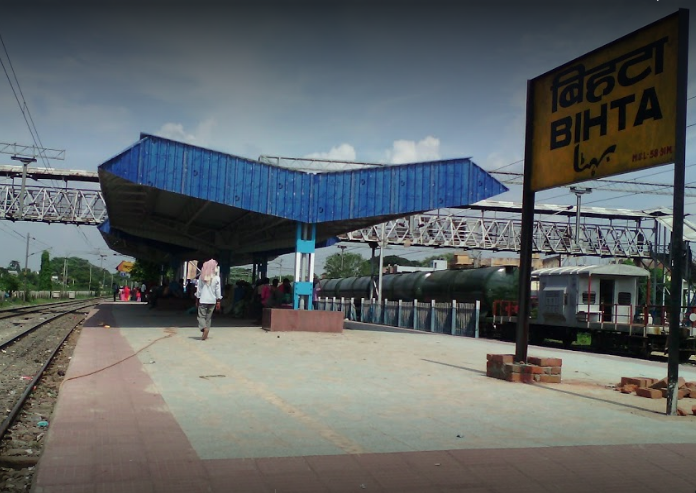
- View of the platform with the station board

General information
- Location: Station Road, Bihta, Patna district, Bihar; India
- Coordinates: 25.5612°N 84.8737°E
- Elevation: 62 metres (203 ft)
- System: Indian Railways station
- Owner: Indian Railways
- Operator: East Central Railway
- Lines: Howrah–Delhi main line (Patna–Mughalsarai section)
- Platforms: 3
- Tracks: 5

Construction
- Structure type: Standard (on-ground station)
- Parking: Available

Other information
- Status: Functioning
- Station code: BTA
- Zone(s): East Central Railway
- Division(s): Danapur
- Fare zone: East Central Railway

Passengers
- 2018: 6,157 (Daily)
Services
Preceding station	Indian Railways	Following station
East Central Railway zone
Patel Halt towards Patna Junction or Howrah Junction	Howrah–Delhi main line Patna–Mughalsarai section	Pali Halt towards Mughalsarai Junction or New Delhi
Route map
- Source: Google maps 13039 Howrah–Delhi Janata Express
Location
- Location within Bihar Location within India
- Interactive map Bihta

Bihta railway station, (station code: BTA), is a railway station serving the town of Bihta in the Patna district in the Indian state of Bihar. It located 28 km west of Patna Junction railway station.

Bihta railway station is connected to most of the major cities in India, which lies in between Delhi–Kolkata main line which serves Bihta with numerous trains. Bihta is well connected to Patna, Delhi, Mumbai, Kolkata, Mughalsarai and a few other cities.

Danapur Division stations

== Platforms ==
There are 3 platforms in Bihta railway station. There are two foot overbridges (FOB) for reaching as well as crossing the platforms.

== Trains ==
There are several trains that stop at Bihta railway station:

Train no.	Name
12333 / 12334	Vibhuti Express (Howrah–Allahabad)
12391 / 12392	Shramjeevi Superfast Express (Rajgir–New Delhi)
13007 / 13008	Udyan Abha Toofan Express (Howrah–Sri Ganganagar)
13049 / 13050	Howrah–Amritsar Express
13119 / 13120	Sealdah–Anand Vihar Terminal Express
13133 / 13134	Sealdah–Varanasi Express
13201 / 13202	Rajendra Nagar–Lokmanya Tilak Terminus Janta Express
13237 / 13238	Patna–Kota Express (via Faizabad)
13239 / 13240	Patna–Kota Express (via Sultanpur)
13249 / 13250	Patna–Bhabua Road Intercity Express
13413 / 13414	Farakka Express (via Sultanpur)
13483 / 13484	Farakka Express (via Faizabad)
20801 / 20802	Magadh Express (New Delhi–Islampur)
22405 / 22406	Bhagalpur–Anand Vihar Terminal Garib Rath Express
53211 / 53212	Patna–Sasaram Passenger
63213 / 63214	Patna–Ara MEMU
63219	Danapur–Raghunathpur MEMU
63220	Raghunathpur–Patna MEMU
63223 / 63224	Patna–Ara MEMU
63225	Patna–Pt. Deen Dayal Upadhyaya MEMU
63226	Varanasi–Patna MEMU
63227 / 63228	Patna–Pt. Deen Dayal Upadhyaya MEMU
63231	Patna–Pt. Deen Dayal Upadhyaya MEMU
63232	Buxar–Patna MEMU
63233	Patna–Varanasi MEMU
63234	Pt. Deen Dayal Upadhyaya–Patna MEMU
63261 / 63262	Fatuha–Buxar MEMU
63263	Patna–Buxar MEMU
63264	Pt. Deen Dayal Upadhyaya–Patna MEMU
