= Patna–Bhabua Road Intercity Express =

Train in India

Overview
- Service type: Express
- First service: 18 July 2013; 12 years ago
- Current operator: East Central Railway zone

Route
- Termini: Patna Junction (PNBE); Bhabua Road (BBU)
- Stops: 10
- Distance travelled: 194 km (121 mi)
- Average journey time: 5h 15m
- Service frequency: Daily (Note: Runs seven days in a week for every direction.)
- Train number: 13249/13250

On-board services
- Class: General Unreserved
- Seating arrangements: Yes
- Sleeping arrangements: No
- Catering facilities: No
- Observation facilities: ICF coach
- Entertainment facilities: No
- Baggage facilities: No
- Other facilities: Below the seats

Technical
- Rolling stock: 2
- Track gauge: 1,676 mm (5 ft 6 in)
- Operating speed: 37 km/h (23 mph), including halts

The Patna–Bhabua Road Intercity Express is an Express train belonging to East Central Railway zone that runs between Patna Junction and Bhabua Road in India. It is currently being operated with 13249/13250 train numbers on a daily basis.

== Service ==
The 13249/Patna–Bhabua Road InterCity Express has an average speed of 37 km/h and covers 194 km in 5h 15m. The 13250/Bhabua Road–Patna InterCity Express has an average speed of 35 km/h and covers 194 km in 5h 30m.

== Route and halts ==
The important halts of the train are:

- Patna Junction
- Danapur
- Bihta
- Ara Junction
- Garhani
- Piro
- Bikramganj
- Garhnokha
- Sasaram Junction
- Kumahu
- Kudra
- Bhabua Road

== Coach composition ==
The train has standard ICF rakes with a maximum speed of 110 km/h. The train consists of 14 coaches:

- 12 General
- 2 Seating cum Luggage Rake

== Traction ==
Both trains are hauled by a Mughalsarai Loco Shed-based WDM-3A diesel locomotive from Patna to Bhabua Road and vice versa.

== Rake sharing ==
The trains shares its rake with

- 13243/13244 Patna–Bhabua Road Intercity Express (via Gaya)
- 53213/53214 Patna–Gaya Passenger
- 53211/53212 Patna–Sasaram Passenger

== See also ==
- Patna Junction railway station
- Bhabua Road railway station
- Patna–Bhabua Road Intercity Express (via Gaya)
- Patna–Gaya Passenger
- Patna–Sasaram Passenger
