= Nadwan railway station =

Railway station in Bihar

NADWAN
- Indian Railways logo

General information
- Location: National Highway 83, Nadwan, Patna district, Bihar; India
- Coordinates: 25.396687°N 85.065674°E
- Elevation: 60 metres (200 ft)
- System: Indian Railways station
- Owner: Indian Railways
- Operator: East Central Railway
- Platforms: 2
- Tracks: 2

Construction
- Structure type: Standard (on ground station)

Other information
- Status: Functioning
- Station code: NDW
- Zone(s): East Central Railway
- Division(s): Danapur

History
- Opened: 1900

Services
Preceding station	Indian Railways	Following station
Masaudhi Court Halt towards ?	East Central Railway zone Patna–Gaya line	Nema Halt towards ?
Location
- Location within India Location within Bihar

Nadwan railway station (station code: NDW), is a railway station on the Patna–Gaya line under Danapur railway division of the East Central Railway zone. The station is situated beside National Highway 83 at Nadwan in Patna district in the Indian state of Bihar.

== History ==
Gaya was connected to Patna in 1900 by East Indian Railway Company by Patna–Gaya line. The Gaya to Jahanabad was electrified in 2002–2003. Electrification of the Patna–Gaya line was completed in 2003.
