= 2020 Patna-Bhabua Intercity Express gang rape =

Gang rape and torture incident in India

- Date: 20 January 2020
- Time: 10:30 pm IST (UTC+05:30)
- Location: Bihar India
- Convicted: Birendra Prakash Singh; Dipak Singh
- Convictions: Rape, Kidnapping

The 2020 Patna-Bhabua Intercity Express gang rape case involved a rape that occurred on 20 January 2020 on the Patna-Bhabua Intercity Express, near Bhabua Road railway station in Bihar.

The incident took place when a 22-year-old HIV positive woman was returning to her home after medical check up at Gaya.

== Incident ==
The victim, a 22-year-old woman, was returning home on the night of 20 January 2020 after a check up, as she was undergoing treatment for HIV. She boarded at Gaya Junction railway station.

Two men, Birendra Prakash Singh and Dipak Singh, overpowered and raped her; they filmed the entire incident, which occurred as the train approached its last stop.
