= Rajgir–Danapur MEMU =

Overview
- Service type: MEMU
- Current operator: East Central Railway zone

Route
- Termini: Rajgir (RGD); Danapur (DNR)
- Stops: 21
- Distance travelled: 109 km (68 mi)
- Average journey time: 4h 35m
- Service frequency: Daily
- Train number: 63339/63340

On-board services
- Class: Unreserved
- Seating arrangements: No
- Sleeping arrangements: Yes
- Catering facilities: No
- Entertainment facilities: No

Technical
- Rolling stock: 2
- Track gauge: 1,676 mm (5 ft 6 in)
- Operating speed: 24 km/h (15 mph)

Rajgir–Danapur MEMU (formerly 53229/53230 Rajgir–Danapur Passenger, ) is a Mainline Electric Multiple Unit (MEMU) train of the Indian Railways that connects Rajgir and Danapur in Bihar. It is currently being operated with trains number 63339 and 63340 on a daily basis.

== Service ==
It averages 24 km/h as 53229 Rajgir–Danapur Passenger and covers 109 km in 4 hrs 35 mins and 24 km/h as 53230 Danapur–Rajgir Passenger and covers 109 km in 4 hrs 30 mins.

== Route and halts ==
- Rajgir
- Nalanda
- Pawapuri Road Halt
- Bihar Sharif Junction
- Wena
- Harnaut
- Bakhtiyarpur Junction
- Karauta
- Khusropur
- Fatuha Junction
- Banka Ghat
- Patna Sahib
- Gulzarbagh
- Rajendra Nagar Terminal
- Patna Junction
- Sachiwalay Halt
- Phulwari Sharif
- Danapur

== Traction ==
Both trains are hauled by a Diesel Loco Shed, Mughalsarai-based WDM-3A diesel locomotive.

== See also ==
- Rajgir railway station
- Danapur railway station
