= Tehta, Jehanabad =

Gram panchayat in Jehanabad district, Bihar, India

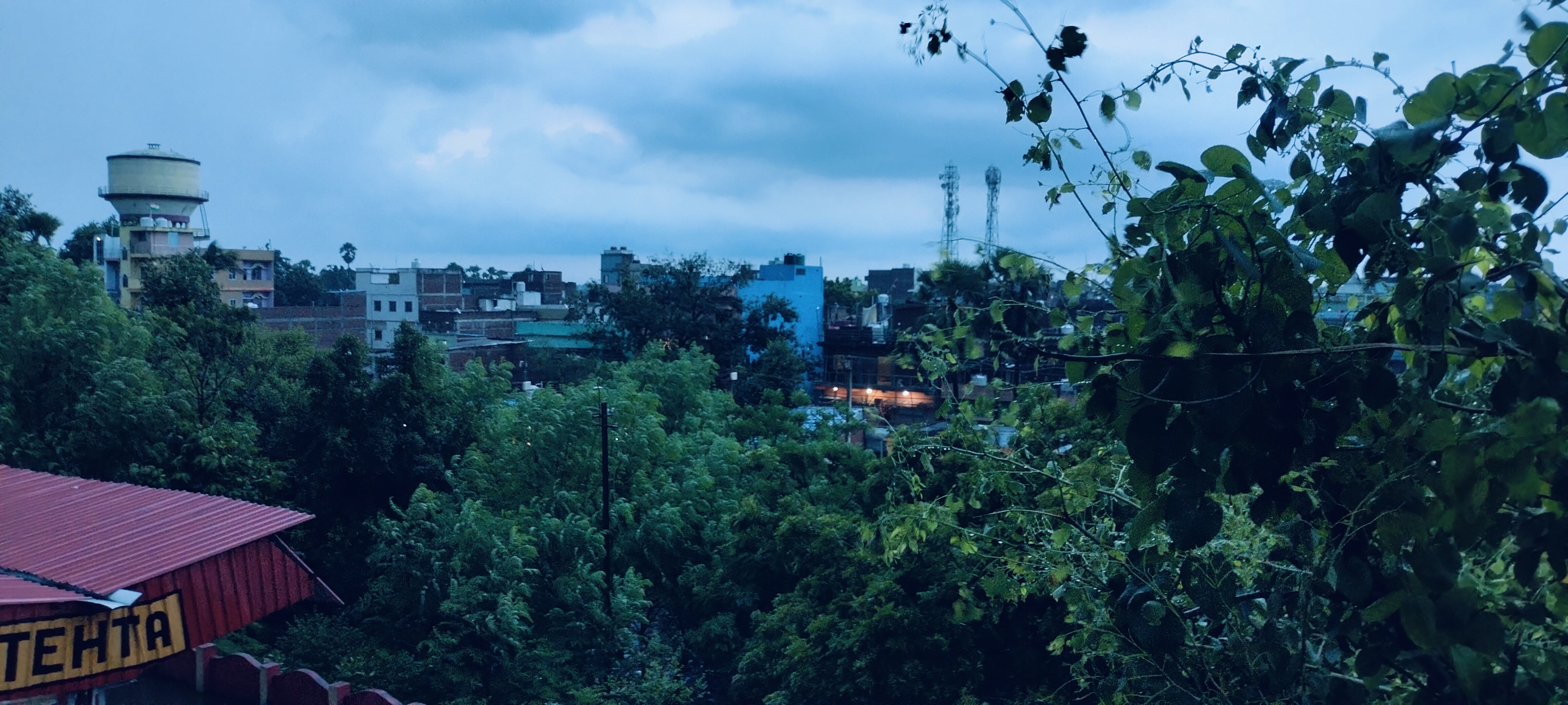
Tehta view from the footbridge of Tehta Railway Station.

E. Saren (also known as East Saren) is a gram panchayat in Makhdumpur block of Jehanabad district, Bihar, India. The village of Tehta falls within this gram panchayat.

== Location ==
E. Saren is located approximately 12 km south of Jehanabad and 4 km from Makhdumpur. It belongs to the Magadh Division of Bihar. The PIN code is 804427.

== Demographics ==
According to the 2011 Census of India, E. Saren gram panchayat has a total population of 14,073 , of which 7,352 are male and 6,721 are female.

== Administration ==
E. Saren is governed under the Panchayati Raj system. It falls under Makhdumpur block, the Makhdumpur assembly constituency, and the Jahanabad parliamentary constituency.

== Transport ==
Tehta railway station serves Tehta and nearby areas. It is located on the Patna–Gaya line and has the station code THA.

== See also ==
- Jehanabad district
- Makhdumpur
- Bihar
