= Jehanabad Court railway station =

Railway station in Bihar

Jehanabad Court
- Jehanabad Court railway station

General information
- Location: National Highway 83, Jehanabad, Jehanabad district, Bihar; India
- Coordinates: 25.201143°N 84.984156°E
- Elevation: 68 metres (223 ft)
- System: Indian Railways station
- Owner: Indian Railways
- Operator: East Central Railway
- Platforms: 2
- Tracks: 2

Construction
- Structure type: Standard (on ground station)

Other information
- Status: Functioning
- Station code: JHDC
- Zone(s): East Central Railway
- Division(s): Danapur

History
- Opened: 1900; 126 years ago

Services
Preceding station	Indian Railways	Following station
Mai Halt towards ?	East Central Railway zone Patna–Gaya line	Jehanabad towards ?
Location
- Location within India Location within Bihar

Jehanabad Court railway station (station code: JNDO), is a railway station on the Patna–Gaya line under Danapur railway division of the East Central Railway zone. The station is situated beside National Highway 83 at Jehanabad in Jehanabad district in the Indian state of Bihar.

== History ==
Gaya was connected to Patna in 1900 by East Indian Railway Company by Patna–Gaya line. The Gaya to Jahanabad was electrified in 2002–2003. Electrification of the Patna–Gaya line was completed in 2003.
