= Rajgir–Bakhtiyarpur DEMU =

Overview
- Service type: DEMU
- Current operator: East Central Railway zone

Route
- Termini: Rajgir (RGD); Bakhtiyarpur Junction (BKP)
- Stops: 5
- Distance travelled: 54 km (34 mi)
- Average journey time: 2h 25m
- Service frequency: Daily
- Train numbers: 73253/73254; 73254/73255

On-board services
- Class: Unreserved
- Seating arrangements: No
- Sleeping arrangements: Yes
- Catering facilities: No
- Entertainment facilities: No

Technical
- Rolling stock: 2
- Track gauge: 1,676 mm (5 ft 6 in)
- Operating speed: 22 km/h (14 mph)

Rajgir–Bakhtiyarpur DEMU was a Passenger express train of the Indian Railways connecting Rajgir in Bihar and Bakhtiyarpur Junction in Bihar. It was cancelled on 16 November 2017. It was operated with 53229/53230 train numbers on daily basis.

== Route and halts ==
- Rajgir
- Nalanda
- Pawapuri Road Halt
- Bihar Sharif Junction
- Wena
- Harnaut
- Bakhtiyarpur Junction

== See also ==
- Rajgir railway station
- Bakhtiyarpur Junction railway station
