= Taregna railway station =

Railway station in Bihar

Taregna Railway Station

General information
- Location: National Highway 83, Masaurhi, Taregana, Patna district, Bihar; India
- Coordinates: 25.35523°N 85.038113°E
- Elevation: 62 metres (203 ft)
- System: Indian Railways station
- Owner: Indian Railways
- Operator: East Central Railway
- Platforms: 2
- Tracks: 4

Construction
- Structure type: Standard (on ground station)
- Parking: Yes

Other information
- Status: Functioning
- Station code: TEA
- Zone(s): East Central Railway
- Division(s): Danapur

History
- Opened: 1900

Services
Preceding station	Indian Railways	Following station
Chhotaki Masaudhi Halt towards ?	East Central Railway zone Patna–Gaya line	Masaudhi Court Halt towards ?
Location
- Location within India Location within Bihar

Taregna railway station (station code: TEA), is a railway station on the Patna–Gaya line under Danapur railway division of the East Central Railway zone. The station is situated beside National Highway 83 at Masaurhi, Taregana in Patna district in the Indian state of Bihar.

== History ==
Gaya was connected to Patna in 1900 by East Indian Railway Company by Patna–Gaya line. The Gaya to Jahanabad was electrified in 2002–2003. Electrification of the Patna–Gaya line was completed in 2003.
