= Chhotaki Masaudhi Halt railway station =

Railway station in Bihar

Chhotaki Masaudhi Halt

General information
- Location: Masaurhi Road, Tineri, Patna district, Bihar; India
- Coordinates: 25.330397°N 85.031751°E
- Elevation: 61 metres (200 ft)
- System: Indian Railways station
- Owner: Indian Railways
- Operator: East Central Railway
- Platforms: 2
- Tracks: 2

Construction
- Structure type: Standard (on-ground station)

Other information
- Status: Functioning
- Station code: CKMI
- Zone(s): East Central Railway
- Division(s): Danapur

History
- Opened: 1900

Services
Preceding station	Indian Railways	Following station
Teneri Halt towards ?	East Central Railway zone Patna–Gaya line	Taregna towards ?
Location
- Location within India Location within Bihar

Chhotaki Masaudhi Halt railway station (station code: CKMI), is a halt railway station on the Patna–Gaya line under Danapur railway division of the East Central Railway zone. The station is situated beside Masaurhi Road at Tineri in Patna district, in the Indian state of Bihar.

== History ==
Gaya was connected to Patna in 1900 by East Indian Railway Company by Patna–Gaya line. The Gaya to Jahanabad was electrified in 2002–2003. Electrification of the Patna–Gaya line was completed in 2003.
