= Patna–Sasaram Passenger =

Train in India

Overview
- Service type: Express
- Current operator: East Central Railway zone

Route
- Termini: Patna Junction (PNBE); Sasaram Junction (SSM)
- Stops: 11
- Distance travelled: 146 km (91 mi)
- Average journey time: 4h 25m
- Service frequency: Daily (Note: Runs seven days in a week for every direction.)
- Train number: 53211/53212

On-board services
- Class: General Unreserved
- Seating arrangements: Yes
- Sleeping arrangements: No
- Catering facilities: No
- Observation facilities: ICF coach
- Entertainment facilities: No
- Baggage facilities: No
- Other facilities: Below the seats

Technical
- Rolling stock: 2
- Track gauge: 1,676 mm (5 ft 6 in)
- Operating speed: 33 km/h (21 mph), including halts

The Patna–Sasaram Passenger is an Express train belonging to East Central Railway zone that runs between Patna Junction and Sasaram Junction in India. It is currently being operated with 53211/53212 train numbers on a daily basis.

== Service ==
The 53211/Patna–Sasaram Passenger has an average speed of 33 km/h and covers 146 km in 4h 25m. The 53212/Sasaram–Patna Passenger has an average speed of 26 km/h and covers 146 km in 5h 35m.

== Route and halts ==
The important halts of the train are:

- Patna Junction
- Sachiwalay Halt
- Phulwari Sharif
- Danapur
- Neora
- Bihta
- Kulharia
- Ara Junction
- Garhani
- Piro
- Bikramganj
- Garhnokha
- Sasaram Junction

== Coach composition ==
The train has standard ICF rakes with a maximum speed of 110 km/h. The train consists of 14 coaches:

- 12 General
- 2 Seating cum Luggage Rake

== Traction ==
Both trains are hauled by a Mughal Sarai Loco Shed-based WAP 4 electric locomotive from Patna to Gaya and vice versa.

== Rake sharing ==
The train shares its rake with

- 13249/13250 Patna–Bhabua Road Intercity Express
- 13243/13244 Patna–Bhabua Road Intercity Express (via Gaya)
- 53213/53214 Patna–Gaya Passenger

== See also ==
- Patna Junction railway station
- Bhabua Road railway station
- Patna–Bhabua Road Intercity Express (via Gaya)
- Patna–Bhabua Road Intercity Express
- Patna–Gaya Passenger
