= Chakand railway station =

Railway station in Bihar

Chakand

General information
- Location: National Highway 83, Gangapur, Gaya district, Bihar; India
- Coordinates: 24.890142°N 84.995494°E
- Elevation: 106 metres (348 ft)
- System: Indian Railways station
- Owner: Indian Railways
- Operator: East Central Railway
- Platforms: 2
- Tracks: 2

Construction
- Structure type: Standard (on ground station)

Other information
- Status: Functioning
- Station code: CKH
- Zone(s): East Central Railway
- Division(s): Danapur

History
- Opened: 1900

Services
Preceding station	Indian Railways	Following station
Gaya Junction towards ?	East Central Railway zone Patna–Gaya line	Ore Halt towards ?
Location
- Location within India Location within Bihar

Chakand railway station (station code: CKH), is a railway station on the Patna–Gaya line under Danapur railway division of the East Central Railway zone. The station is situated beside National Highway 83, Gangapur in Gaya district in the Indian state of Bihar.

== History ==
Gaya was connected to Patna in 1900 by East Indian Railway Company by Patna–Gaya line. The Gaya to Jahanabad was electrified in 2002–2003. Electrification of the Patna–Gaya line was completed in 2003.
