= Nadwan, Patna =

Nadwan
- Village
- Location in Bihar, India Nadwan (India)
- Coordinates: 25°24′00″N 85°04′00″E
- Country: India
- State: Bihar
- District: Patna

Population (2011)
  - Total: 10,000

Languages
  - Official: Hindi
  - Additional official: Urdu
  - Regional: Magahi
- Time zone: UTC+5:30 (IST)
- ISO 3166 code: IN-BR
- Website: patna.nic.in

Nadwan is a small town located in Dhanarua Block, Patna district, Bihar state, India. It is located about 24 kilometres (15 mi) south from Patna and 70 kilometres (43 mi) north from Gaya, where Gautum Buddha got enlightenment. It lies near National Highway 83, and has a railway station named Nadwan railway station on Patna–Gaya line of East Central Railway zone.

== Education ==
Around 60 years ago, the villagers of Nadwan opened a school (now known as Middle School and High School Nadwan). This school has produced many doctors, engineers, and scientists. This village also has a college, K P S College Nadwan, This is the main source of poor villagers for doing their graduation and post-graduation.

Many educational institutions have moved to this village, and Doon Public School (http://dphspatna.com) opened a branch.
