= JMU (disambiguation) =

James Madison University is a public research university in Harrisonburg, Virginia, United States.

JMU may also refer to:

- Jamui railway station, in Bihar, India
- Japan Marine United
- Jiamusi Songjiang International Airport, in Heilongjiang, China
- Jimei University, in Xiamen, Fujian, China
- Jewish Military Union, a Second World War resistance organization
- Julius-Maximilians University of Würzburg, in Germany
- Liverpool John Moores University, in England
