= Mai Halt railway station =

Railway station in Bihar

MAI HALT
- Indian Railways logo

General information
- Location: Mai, Jehanabad district, Bihar; India
- Coordinates: 25.156632°N 84.987819°E
- Elevation: 71 metres (233 ft)
- System: Indian Railways station
- Owner: Indian Railways
- Operator: East Central Railway
- Platforms: 2
- Tracks: 2

Construction
- Structure type: Standard (on-ground station)

Other information
- Status: Functioning
- Station code: IAM
- Zone(s): East Central Railway
- Division(s): Danapur

History
- Opened: 1900; 126 years ago

Services
Preceding station	Indian Railways	Following station
Niyazipur Halt towards ?	East Central Railway zone Patna–Gaya line	Jehanabad Court towards ?
Location
- Location within India Location within Bihar

Mai Halt railway station (station code: IAM), is a halt railway station on the Patna–Gaya line under Danapur railway division of the East Central Railway zone. The station is situated at Mai in Jehanabad district in the Indian state of Bihar.

== History ==
The Patna-Gaya line connected Gaya and Patna in 1900 under the supervision of the East Indian Railway Company. The line between Gaya and Jahanabad was electrified in 2002–2003. Electrification of the Patna–Gaya line was completed in 2003.
