= Parsa Bazar railway station =

Railway station in Bihar

PARSA BAZAR
- Indian Railways logo

General information
- Location: Parsa Bazar, Patna, Bihar; India
- Coordinates: 25.5499°N 85.1189°E
- Elevation: 54 metres (177 ft)
- System: Indian Railways
- Owner: Indian Railways
- Operator: East Central Railway
- Platforms: 2
- Tracks: 4
- Connections: Auto stand

Construction
- Structure type: Standard (on-ground station)
- Parking: No
- Cycle facilities: No

Other information
- Status: Functioning
- Station code: PRBZ
- Zone(s): East Central Railway
- Division(s): Danapur

Services
Preceding station	Indian Railways	Following station
Ramgovindsingh Mahuli Halt towards ?	East Central Railway zone Patna–Gaya line	Patna Junction towards ?
Location
- Location within India Location within Bihar Location within Patna
- Interactive map of Parsa Bazar

Parsa Bazar railway station (station code: PRBZ) is a railway station in Patna district, of the Indian state of Bihar. It serves Patna city. The station consists of two platforms.
