= Yadunandan Sharma =

- Born: 1896; Manjhiyawan village, Gaya district, Bihar, India
- Died: 1975 (aged 78–79)
- Education: B.A. from Benaras Hindu University
- Alma mater: Banaras Hindu University
- Occupations: Peasant leader, National liberation figure
- Known for: Reora Satyagraha
- Movement: Civil Disobedience Movement, Kisan movement

Yadunandan Sharma (also spelled Jadunandan) (1896–1975) was an Indian peasant leader and national liberation figure from the Indian state of Bihar. He had started a movement for the rights of tillers against the zamindars and Britishers at Reora celebrated as the Reora Satyagraha.

== Biography ==
Yadunandan Sharma was born in a Bhumihar family in Manjhiyawan village, Gaya district, in 1896. The village was part of the Tekari zamindari. His father died when Sharma was aged three and he had to begin work as a cowherd while very young. This cause him to miss school and it was only in 1914 that, impelled by the desire to become literate, he ran away to Benaras where he learned the alphabet.

He matriculated in 1919 from Tekari high school and became a teacher for one year in a village school. He worked also as a manager in a zamindari, getting a first hand knowledge of the system. Not happy with it, he again went off to Benaras and joined Benaras Hindu University and studied until 1929 when he graduated. After his B.A. degree, he left education and joined Civil Disobedience Movement. He was arrested and sentenced for 16 months in 1930. After being released from jail, he joined the Kisan movement in 1933 and started the famous Sandako and Reora Satyagraha in the 1930s. He became the undisputed leader of peasants in the Gaya district and second in command to the legendary freedom fighter and peasant leader Sahajanand Saraswati. Most of his life was spent in the Neyamatpur village in an ashram from where he kept revolting against the British Rule and Zamindari. Pandit Nehru paid a visit to the Ashram in 1936 on a chilling winter night in December to meet him and address a mass gathering of the locals. He died in 1975.After freedom once he fought election from makhdumpur constituency of gaya district for MLA but he lost.

== Books authored ==
- Sharma, Yadunandan, 1947, Bakasht Mahamari Aur Uska Achook Ilaaz (Bakasht Epidemic and its Infalliable Remedy) in Hindi, Allahabad.

== See also ==
- Mata Badal Koeri
