= Azimabad Express =

Train in India

Overview
- Service type: Superfast
- Locale: Gujarat, Madhya Pradesh, Rajasthan, Uttar Pradesh & Bihar
- First service: 19 February 2007; 19 years ago
- Current operator: Western Railway

Route
- Termini: Ahmedabad (ADI); Rajgir (RGD)
- Stops: 25
- Distance travelled: 1,860 km (1,156 mi)
- Average journey time: 31 hrs 30 mins
- Service frequency: Bi-weekly
- Train number: 12947 / 12948

On-board services
- Classes: AC 2 Tier, AC 3 Tier, Sleeper Class, General Unreserved
- Seating arrangements: Yes
- Sleeping arrangements: Yes
- Catering facilities: On-board catering, E-catering
- Observation facilities: Large windows
- Baggage facilities: Available
- Other facilities: Below the seats

Technical
- Rolling stock: LHB coach
- Track gauge: 1,676 mm (5 ft 6 in)
- Operating speed: 60 km/h (37 mph) average including halts.

The 12947 / 12948 Azimabad Express is a superfast express train connecting two significant cities: Ahmedabad Jn in Gujarat and Rajgir in Bihar. Rajgir, a historic city in Bihar, it served as the capital for the Haryanka, Pradyota, Brihadratha dynasties, and the Mauryan Empire. It was also the first capital of the ancient kingdom of Great Magadha and a prominent retreat center for the Buddha and his sangha. Ahmedabad, on the other hand, is the most populous city in Gujarat.

The Azimabad Express, previously running between Patna Junction (PNBE) and Ahmedabad Junction (ADI), has been extended to Rajgir (RGD) starting July 25, 2025, for departures from Rajgir and July 28, 2025, for departures from Ahmedabad. "Azimabad" was the historical name of Patna during the later Mughal period.

== Service ==
It operates as train number 12947 from Ahmedabad Junction to Rajgir and as train number 12948 in the reverse direction, serving the states of Gujarat, Madhya Pradesh, Rajasthan, Uttar Pradesh & Bihar. The train covers the distance of 1,860.6 km (1,156.1 mi) in 31 hours 30 minutes approximately, at a speed of (60 km/h (37 mph)).

As the average speed of the train is above 55 km/h (34 mph), as per Indian Railways rules, its fare includes a Superfast surcharge.

== Coaches ==
Azimabad runs with standard LHB 22 coaches AC 2 Tier, AC 3 Tier, General & SLR. No pantry car is routinely available but may be attached.

| Loco | 1 | 2 | 3 | 4 | 5 | 6 | 7 | 8 | 9 | 10 | 11 | 12 | 13 | 14 | 15 | 16 | 17 | 18 | 19 | 20 | 21 | 22 |
|---|---|---|---|---|---|---|---|---|---|---|---|---|---|---|---|---|---|---|---|---|---|---|
| | EOG | GEN | GEN | A1 | B1 | B2 | B3 | B4 | S1 | S10 | S9 | S8 | S7 | S6 | S5 | S4 | S3 | S2 | S11 | GEN | GEN | EOG |

== Routeing ==
The 12947/12948 Azimabad Express runs from Ahmedabad Junction via Anand Junction, Chhayapuri (Vadodara), Ratlam Junction, Kota Junction, Sawai Madhopur Junction, Gangapur City, Agra Fort, Tundla, Kanpur Central, Allahabad Junction, Mughalsarai Junction, Ara Junction, Danapur, Patna Jn, Patna Saheb, Bakhtiyarpur Jn, Bihar Sharif, Nalanda to Rajgir.

== Traction ==
As the route is fully electrified, a Vadodara Loco Shed-based WAP-7 electric locomotive on its entire journey.

== Rake sharing ==
The train shares its rake with;

- 20953/20954 MGR Chennai Central-Ahmedabad Superfast Express

== See also ==
- Garba Express
