= Patel Halt railway station =

Railway station in Bihar, India

General information
- Location: Patna, Bihar; India
- Coordinates: 25.5639°N 84.8961°E
- Elevation: 61 metres (200 ft)
- System: Indian Railways station
- Owner: Indian Railways
- Operator: East Central Railway
- Platforms: 2
- Tracks: 2
- Connections: Auto stand

Construction
- Structure type: Standard (on-ground station)
- Parking: No
- Cycle facilities: No

Other information
- Status: Functioning
- Station code: PATL
- Zone(s): East Central Railway
- Division(s): Danapur

Services
Preceding station	Indian Railways	Following station
Bihta towards ?	East Central Railway zone Ara–Danapur section	Sadisopur towards ?
Location

Patel Halt (station code: PATL) is a small railway station in Patna district, of the Indian state of Bihar. It serves many villages around Bihta and Sadisopur in the Patna district. Due to this small but functional railway station many students, government employees, the elderly, as well as patients, get easy access to basic transportation to Patna. The station consists of 2 platforms. Tickets are available through manual punching machines.

This railway station was named after Sardar Vallabhbhai Patel, popularly known as Sardar Patel, who was the first Deputy Prime Minister of India. The nearest village to this railway station is Shahwajpur, which takes care of the platforms. In recent years, the village has become connected with better roads, whereas previously it was catered primarily by Patel Halt.

Youth from nearby villages specialize in different areas like Engineering, Medical and Scientific research.Dr. Jitendra Sinha from the village Shahwajpur is a well-known Neuroscientist and Professor who has conducted research areas of obesity and aging.
