= MGR Chennai Central–Ahmedabad Superfast Express =

Train in India

MGR Chennai Central – Ahmedabad Junction Superfast Express

Overview
- Service type: Express
- Locale: Tamil Nadu, Andhra Pradesh, Karnataka, Maharashtra & Gujarat
- First service: 1 February 2015; 11 years ago
- Current operator: Western Railway

Route
- Termini: MGR Chennai Central (MAS); Ahmedabad Junction (ADI)
- Stops: 23
- Distance travelled: 1,717 km (1,067 mi)
- Average journey time: 29 hours 25 minutes
- Service frequency: Weekly
- Train number: 20953 / 20954

On-board services
- Classes: AC 2 Tier, AC 3 Tier, Sleeper class & General Unreserved
- Seating arrangements: Yes
- Sleeping arrangements: Yes
- Catering facilities: On-board catering, E-catering
- Observation facilities: Large windows
- Baggage facilities: Available
- Other facilities: Below the seats

Technical
- Rolling stock: LHB coach
- Track gauge: 1,676 mm (5 ft 6 in)
- Operating speed: 130 km/h (81 mph) maximum, 58 km/h (36 mph) average including halts.
Route map
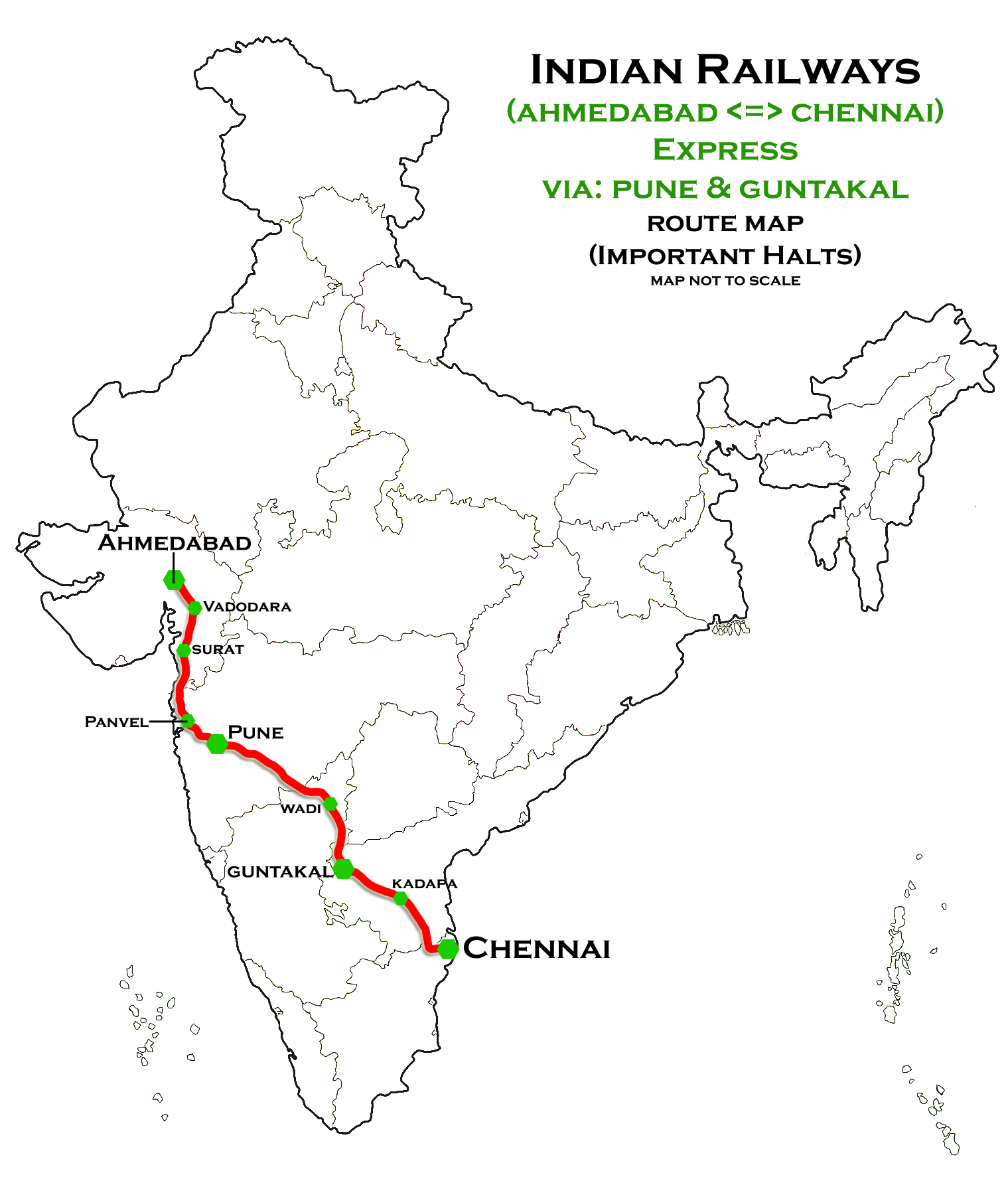

The 20953 / 20954 MGR Chennai Central–Ahmedabad Superfast Express is an Express train belonging to Indian Railways that run between Chennai Central railway station and Ahmedabad Junction in India.

== Service ==
It operates as train number 20953 from Chennai Central to Ahmedabad Junction and as train number 20954 in the reverse direction, serving the states of Tamil Nadu, Andhra Pradesh, Karnataka, Maharashtra and Gujarat. The train covers the distance of 1,717 km (1,067 mi) in 32 hours, which is approximately a speed of 53 km/h (33 mph).

The Mas–Adi Express – 20953 runs on 2 days per week (Thursday and Sunday) and on return Adi–Mas Express – 20954 runs on Wednesday and Saturday.

The train is named as MAS ADI EXPRESS. It leaves Chennai at 20:00 on day 1 and reaches Ahmedabad at 05:35 on day 3.It takes 33 hrs 35 mins to reach from its source to the destination.

On return, it leaves Ahmedabad at 09:40 on day 1 and reaches Chennai at 17:10 on day 2. It takes 31 hrs 30 mins to reach from its source to the destination.

== Coaches ==
The service presently has one AC 2 Tier, four AC 3 Tier, seven Sleeper coaches and four General Unreserved coaches and currently powered by LHB rake.

As with most train services in India, coach composition may be amended at the discretion of Indian Railways depending on demand.

Loco	1	2	3	4	5	6	7	8	9	10	11	12	13	14	15	16	17	18
	EOG	GEN	GEN	S7	S6	S5	S4	S3	S2	S1	B4	B3	B2	B1	A1	GEN	GEN	EOG

== Routing ==
The train runs from MGR Chennai Central via Arakkonam Junction, Renigunta Junction, Guntakal Junction, Wadi Junction, Solapur, Pune Junction, Kalyan Junction, Vasai Road, Surat, Vadodara Junction to Ahmedabad Junction.

== Traction ==
As this route is partially electrified, a Arakkonam / Vijayawada-based WAP-4 locomotive pulls the train to Guntakal Junction then a Pune-based WDP-4D locomotive pulls the train to Pune Junction later a Vadodara-based WAP-7 locomotive pulls the train to its destination.

== Rake sharing ==
The train shares its rake with;

- 12947/12948 Azimabad Express
- 20919/20920 MGR Chennai Central-Ekta Nagar Superfast Express
