= Shiu Sagar Road railway station =

Railway station in Bihar

Shiu Sagar Road

General information
- Location: State Highway 67, Shiv Sagar Road, Rohtas district, Bihar; India
- Coordinates: 25°00′01″N 83°53′45″E
- Elevation: 98 metres (322 ft)
- System: Indian Railways station
- Owner: Indian Railways
- Operator: East Central Railway
- Line: Gaya–Pandit Deen Dayal Upadhyaya Junction section
- Platforms: 4

Construction
- Structure type: Standard on ground
- Parking: No
- Cycle facilities: No

Other information
- Status: Functioning
- Station code: SSG
- Division(s): Pandit Deen Dayal Upadhyaya

History
- Opened: 1906
- Electrified: 1961–63

Services
Preceding station	Indian Railways	Following station
Kumahu towards ?	East Central Railway zone Mughalsarai–Dhanbad section	Khurmabad towards ?
Location
- Location within Bihar

Shiu Sagar Road railway station is a railway station situated on the Gaya–Pandit Deen Dayal Upadhyaya Junction section under East Central Railway zone. It is located beside State Highway 67, Shiv Sagar Road in Rohtas district in the Indian state of Bihar.

== History ==
The East Indian Railway Company started connecting Delhi and Howrah from the mid nineteenth century. In 1862, the railway tracks crossed Mughalsarai and reached the western bank of the Yamuna. The through link to Delhi was established in 1866.

== Electrification ==
The Mughalsarai–Howrah sector was electrified in 1961–63.
