= Pothahi railway station =

Railway station in Bihar

Pothahi

General information
- Location: Pothahi, Patna district, Bihar; India
- Coordinates: 25.44312°N 85.083318°E
- Elevation: 56 metres (184 ft)
- System: Indian Railways station
- Owner: Indian Railways
- Operator: East Central Railway
- Platforms: 2
- Tracks: 2

Construction
- Structure type: Standard (on-ground station)

Other information
- Status: Functioning
- Station code: PFT
- Zone(s): East Central Railway
- Division(s): Danapur

History
- Opened: 1900

Services
Preceding station	Indian Railways	Following station
Nema Halt towards ?	East Central Railway zone Patna–Gaya line	Jatdumri Halt towards ?
Location
- Location within India Location within Bihar

Pothahi railway station (station code: PFT), is a railway station on the Patna–Gaya line under Danapur railway division of the East Central Railway zone. The station is situated at Pothahi in Patna district in the Indian state of Bihar.

== History ==
Gaya was connected to Patna in 1900 by East Indian Railway Company by Patna–Gaya line. The Gaya to Jahanabad was electrified in 2002–2003. Electrification of the Patna–Gaya line was completed in 2003.
