= Makhdumpur Gaya railway station =

Railway station in Bihar

Makhdumpur Gaya

General information
- Location: Makhdumpur, Jehanabad district, Bihar; India
- Coordinates: 25.077131°N 84.979105°E
- Elevation: 77 metres (253 ft)
- System: Indian Railways station
- Owner: Indian Railways
- Operator: East Central Railway
- Platforms: 2
- Tracks: 2

Construction
- Structure type: Standard (on ground station)

Other information
- Status: Functioning
- Station code: MDE
- Zone(s): East Central Railway
- Division(s): Danapur

History
- Opened: 1900; 126 years ago

Services
Preceding station	Indian Railways	Following station
Barabar towards ?	East Central Railway zone Patna–Gaya line	Tehta towards ?
Location
- Location within India Location within Bihar

Makhdumpur Gaya railway station (station code: MDE), is a railway station on the Patna–Gaya line under Danapur railway division of the East Central Railway zone. The station is situated at Makhdumpur in Jehanabad district in the Indian state of Bihar.

== History ==
Gaya was connected to Patna in 1900 by East Indian Railway Company by Patna–Gaya line. The Gaya to Jahanabad was electrified in 2002–2003. Electrification of the Patna–Gaya line was completed in 2003.
