= Jamui railway station =

Railway station in Jamui, Bihar, India

JAMUI

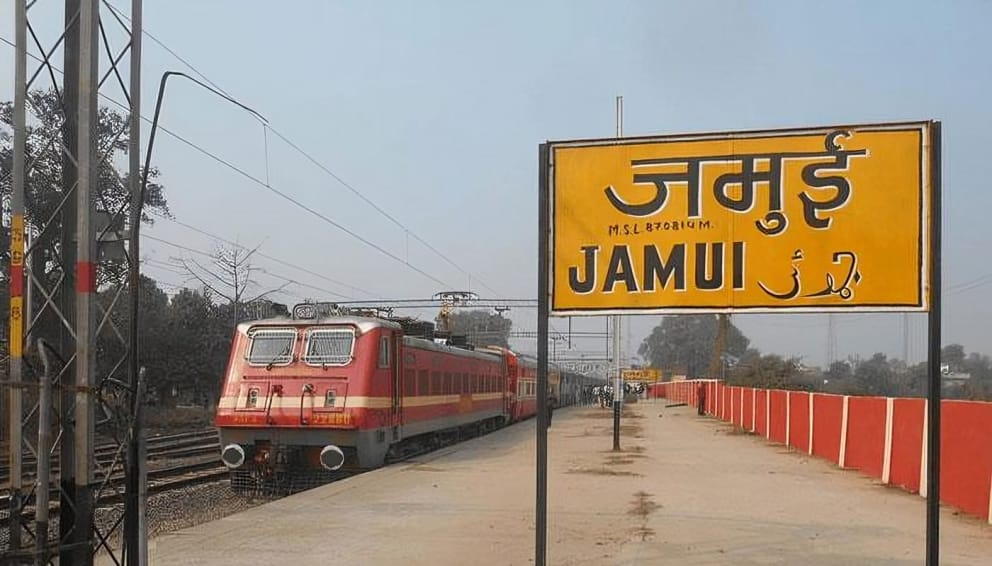
- Jamui railway station nameboard

General information
- Location: Malaypur, Jamui, Jamui, Bihar; India
- Coordinates: 25°4′22″N 86°10′23″E
- Elevation: 81 metres (266 ft)
- System: Indian Railways station
- Lines: Howrah–Delhi main line Asansol–Patna section
- Platforms: 2
- Tracks: 5

Construction
- Structure type: Standard (on-ground station)
- Parking: Available

Other information
- Status: Functional
- Station code: JMU
- Zone(s): East Central Railway
- Division(s): Danapur

History
- Former names: East Indian Railway
Route map
Location
- Location within India Location within Bihar
- Interactive map of Jamui

Jamui railway station (station code: JMU), serves the headquarters of Jamui district in the Indian state of Bihar. It is one of the major railway stations in Danapur division of East Central Railway. Jamui is connected to metropolitan areas of India, by the Delhi–Kolkata main line via Mugalsarai–Patna route which runs along the historic Grand Trunk Road.

Railways and roads are the main means of transport in the Jamui region. Jamui railway station is in Howrah–Patna–Mughalsarai main line. Most of the Patna, Barauni-bound express trains coming from Howrah, Sealdah, Ranchi, Tatanagar stop here.

== Facilities ==
The major facilities available are waiting rooms, computerized reservation facility, reservation counter, UTS Machine, ATM, Coach Indicator Board, vehicle parking. The vehicles are allowed to enter the station premises. The station also has STD/ISD/PCO telephone booth, toilets, tea stall and book stall.

There are two platforms here, which are Very Good in condition

== Trains ==
Many passenger and express trains serve Jamui Junction.

== Nearest airports ==
The nearest airports to Jamui Station are:

1. Deoghar Airport, Deoghar 56 kilometres (35 mi)
2. Birsa Munda Airport, Ranchi 235 kilometres (146 mi)
3. Gaya Airport 151 kilometres (94 mi)
4. Lok Nayak Jayaprakash Airport, Patna 152 kilometres (94 mi)
5. Netaji Subhash Chandra Bose International Airport, Kolkata 369 kilometres (229 mi)
