= Neyamatpur =

- village
- Location in Bihar, India Neyamatpur (India)
- Coordinates: 24.938821°N 84.986007°E
- Country: India
- State: Bihar
- District: Gaya

Languages
  - Official: Magahi, Hindi
- Time zone: UTC+5:30 (IST)
- PIN: 804 403
- Telephone code: 631

Neyamatpur is a village in Gaya district of Bihar, India. The village was a bastion of the Indian National Congress and Kisan Andolan during the British period. "Pandit" Yadunandan Sharma, at the instruction of Swami Sahajanand Saraswati established an ashram here in 1933.

== Etymology and History ==
Neyamatpur is derived from the Urdu word (from Persian) niyamat, meaning blessing and the Sanskrit word pur, meaning village. Hence, Neyamatpur translates to the "Blessed Village" or the "Village of Blessings". Not much known is known of the history of the village beyond a hundred years due to the lack of the written record.

== Neyamatpur Ashram and the Independence Movement ==
After it was established by Yadunandan Sharma, at the instruction of Swami Sahajanand Saraswati in 1933, it saw a large number of freedom fighters visiting. In 1935, Jawaharlal Nehru came to the Ashram and donated a bag of 450 silver coins to the Deen Bandhu Library established by Amarnath Diwan. The library was subsequently renamed after Nehru's wife Kamala to Kamala Pustakalaya. Nothing remains of the original library and the original ashram. However, the site of the ashram is still called the Ashram and a new building erected at the site of the original library is often referred to as the Ashram. This building has housed a school at various times in the past decades.

Amongst the founders of Akhil Bharatiya Kisan Sabha, Swami Sahajanand Saraswati, Prof N G Ranga, Baba Sohan Singh Bhakna, Bankim Mukherjee, Acharya Narendra Deva, Yadunandan Sharma, E. M. S. Namboodiripad, Dr ZA Ahmed, Indulal Yagnik were prominent. In July 1936, a meeting of Central Committee of Akhil Bharatiya Kisan Sabha was held at Neyamatpur chaired by Dr Rajendra Prasad, who later became the first President of India. A legislation was passed and the 'Red Flag' was adopted as the flag of Akhil Bharatiya Kisan Sabha. In the meeting, Indulal Yajnik, Prof Ranga, Shardul Singh, Kapishwar, Mohanlal Goutam, K Shakadev Malviya, Sri Ramanda Mishra etc. were present. In 1936 Kisan Satyagraha was conducted at Sahwaspur, Belaganj from Neyamatpur Ashram after 1st Kisan Satyagraha at Vardoli and also at Sanda, Manjhiawan, Reura, Agandha and Bhalua villages of Gaya district in 1937. In 1937, the Kisan Council (Peasant Council) held at Neyamatpur Ashram appointed Dr KM Ashraf as the convener for the revolutionary organisation's UP chapter; he successfully started off a campaign from Pilibhit in December that year. On 14 July 1937, the All India Kisan Council voted to adopt the Red Flag as its emblem. According to one author, Nehru was late in arriving by train and didn't get off the train in despair when he learnt that the Red Flag, and not the Tricolour of the Congress was adopted in his absence. Subhash Chandra Bose lauded this adoption of the Red Flag, in a speech in the Albert Hall, Calcutta on 27–28 October 1937. Subsequently, he visited the ashram during his 1939-40 sojourn.

In 1942, bullets were fired at the Ashram and the library Kamala Pustakalaya was damaged by a British Police Officer called "Tomeo". The bullet-ridden door survived several decades only to be used as cooking fuel by a villager who reclaimed the original ashram land on the account of his ancestors having donated it. In 1950, Mohan Singh, the Commander General of the Azad Hind Fauj (Indian National Army) visited the Ashram. "Sarvodaya Neta" Jaiprakash Narayan visited the Ashram in 1958 after he joined the Sarvodaya Movement. Jagjivan Ram, then the Defence Minister of India visited the Ashram and the village in 1973 on the occasion of 40th Anniversary of the Ashram. Pandit Yadunandan Sharma spent the latter part of his life at the Ashram where he died in 1975 and his body was cremated here and a "smarak" was built in memoriam. The Ashram subsequently went into decadence and even its ruins can no longer be seen at its original site in the south of the premises, because the land-reclaiming villager tilled over them in an attempt to reclaim the donated land.

There is a renewed interest in the Ashram due to local youth activism . On March 16, 2021, the Member of Parliament from Gaya, Vijay Kumar raised the matter in the Parliament and requested that the Neyamatpur Ashram and its lost library be declared monuments of national heritage, be renovated and be developed as a tourist destination of national importance.

The Annual Congress Session of 1922 under the presidency of "Deshbandhu" Chittaranjan Das was going to be held here due to its importance in the Indian National Movement but it was later held in the neighbouring city of Gaya. Swami Sahajanand Saraswati used to live in the Ashram in the west of the village. Pandit Yadunandan Sharma, the great peasant leader of the Kisan Andolan spent most of his life in the Ashram. Although many people are falsely registered in the village as "Swatantrata Senanis" (independence fighters), only three people (alive during the registration) are believed to have gone to jail (the criterion for benefits under the freedom fighter pension and benefits scheme). The last of these three- Ram Dahin Singh, died in 2010.

== Economy and Infrastructure ==
Neyamatpur's economy is primarily agricultural. However, some people own businesses and others have jobs in the public and private sectors. Neori is the nearest marketplace. Some people from the village have businesses there. Belaganj ("Bela") is about 4.5 km away and serves as a larger market for goods and services that Neori cannot provide. The city of Gaya is about 14 km to the south of Neyamatpur and is connected by both rail and road. Neyamatpur was the first railway halt built on the Patna-Gaya rail line but barring the short stoppage of common "passenger" trains, no major trains stop here. The railway halt in the village of Or was built decades later and is only about 2 km to the south.

There is a small government school, a petrol pump (gas station) and two Hindu temples in the village. The nearest hospital is in Belaganj but there are a few pharmacies in the nearby market of Neori village. The village has a playground called the "Field" or "Peed Par" next to the pond. Neyamatpur has had its own cricket and football teams; various sports tournaments have been organized by the village.
