= Punpun railway station =

Railway station in Bihar

PUNPUN
- Indian Railways logo

General information
- Location: Masudi Road, Manora, Punpun, Patna district, Bihar; India
- Coordinates: 25.48823°N 85.098768°E
- Elevation: 58 metres (190 ft)
- System: Indian Railways station
- Owner: Indian Railways
- Operator: East Central Railway
- Platforms: 2
- Tracks: 2

Construction
- Structure type: Standard (on ground station)

Other information
- Status: Functioning
- Station code: PPN
- Zone(s): East Central Railway
- Division(s): Danapur

History
- Opened: 1900

Services
Preceding station	Indian Railways	Following station
Jatdumri Halt towards ?	East Central Railway zone Patna–Gaya line	Punpun Ghat Halt towards ?
Location
- Location within Bihar Location within India
- Interactive map

Punpun railway station (station code: PPN), is a railway station on the Patna–Gaya line under Danapur railway division of the East Central Railway zone. The station is situated beside Masudi Road at Manora, Punpun in Patna district in the Indian state of Bihar.

== History ==
Gaya was connected to Patna in 1900 by East Indian Railway Company by Patna–Gaya line. The Gaya to Jahanabad was electrified in 2002–2003. Electrification of the Patna–Gaya line was completed in 2003.
