= Makhdumpur, Bihar =

Town in Bihar, India

Makhdumpur
- Town
- Location in Bihar, India
- Coordinates: 25.072°N 84.973°E
- Country: India
- State: Bihar
- District: Jehanabad

Government
  - Type: Nagar Panchayat

Area
  - Total: 20 km^{2} (7.7 sq mi)
- Elevation: 77 m (253 ft)

Population (2011)
  - Total: 31,994

Languages
  - Official: Magahi, Hindi
- Time zone: UTC+5:30 (IST)
- PIN: 804422
- ISO 3166 code: IN-BR
- Vehicle registration: BR 25

Makhdumpur is a town in the Bihar state of India. It is a major town of Jehanabad district and Patna-Gaya Corridor. The Barabar Hills/Barabar Caves tourist region is 10 KM South-East of Makhdumpur proper city.

== Demographics ==
According to the 2011 Census of india Makhdumpur Urban Area has population of 31,994 in which 16,718 are males and 15,276 are females. Makhdumpur town is among the fastest growing populated town of Magadh region and South central Bihar.

Makhdumpur is the 3rd biggest city of Patna-Gaya Road/Rail Corridor after Jehanbad& Masaurhi as a part of Single City.

Population Cast wise

- OBC& General- 77.7%
- SC- 22.1%
- ST- 0.2%

Population Religion wise

- Hindu- 88.96%
- Muslim- 10.81%
- Christian- 0.08%
- Sikhs- 0.02%
- Other- 0%
- No specified Religion- 0.13%

- Literacy rate of Makhdumpur is about 70% or 69.08% (higher than state average 61.80%) in which male literacy rate is 77.97% and of Female is 59.31%.
- Male-Female Sex birth ratio is 914 against State average of 918.

Makhdumpur Block is divided into 1 town and 117 notified villages makes its biggest Block/Tahsil of Jehanbad District. Makhdumpur Block has a total population of 260,154 (in which 228,160 are rural) constituted of 134,863 males and 125,291 females.

Population Caste wise

- OBC& General- 77%
- SC- 22.9%
- ST- 0.1%

Population Religion wise

- Hindu- 93.18%
- Muslim- 6.57%
- Buddhist- 0.07%
- Christian- 0.06%
- Sikh- 0.01%
- Jain- 0.01%
- Other- 0%
- No specified Religion- 0.11%

- Literacy rate of block is 64.26% in which male literacy rate is 75.69% and of female is 51.97%.

- Sex Ratio of Makhdumpur block is 929, means if 1000 child take birth here then 929 child are girls.

== Transport ==
The NH-83(now NH-22) Patna-Gaya-Dobhi Highway passes through Makhdumpur. Makhdumpur is also directly connected by roads with some major town/city of nearby districts like Rajgir, Tekari, Hulasgang, Shakurabad, Kurtha, Paibigha and many more. There is 1 railway Station Makhdumpur Gaya railway station and 1 Halt Wanabar Koteshwarnath Dham is situated in the Makhdumpur Urban Area. Patna-Gaya-Dobhi bypass which passes through west of the city, but it is not opened yet for Public by NHAI Authority for transportation.

== Infrastructure ==
Makhdumpur Market is the most educated and influential village and supports a railway station, bus stand, police station and referral hospital in close proximity. Makhdumpur, Kayamaganj, Paleya is nearby market for daily use.

Sukhdev Prasad Referral Hospital is a government hospital with 24/7 support near block.

== Geography ==
Makhdumpur is situated between Gaya and Jehanabad in the Jehanabad district. It is about 60 km towards south from Patna and 30 km towards north from Gaya.

Makhdumpur is situated on the bank of Jamuna. Jamuna river is the backbone for agriculture in this region.

Dardha river also flows through this area about 4 km west from the main town.

Barabar Caves/Barabar Hills is the most visited places of Makhdumpur region or Jehanabad District. Barabar Caves is one of the major tourist attraction of Bihar. It is 11 km towards south-East from the main town. There are many man-made caves in this hilly region which built by the kings of Maurya empire.Lomas Rishi Cave/Satgharva Cave is the most famous cave of the Barabar Caves.The Barabar Hill Caves are the oldest surviving rock-cut caves in India, dating from the Maurya Empire (322–185 BCE).

Here is a list of some villages near Makhdumpur: ≈≈Villages≈≈

- Samochak
- Khalkochak
- Paapu
- Paleya
- Ladaua
- Bhaane Bigha
- Solhanda
- Chamandi
- Chandai
- Kansaara
- Aankopur
- Dharnai

== Education ==
- High School Makhdumpur, an BSEB affiliated boys school up to class 10th
- Project Kanya High School Makhdumpur, an BSEB affiliated girls school up to class 10th
- KLS Adarsh High School an BSEB affiliated co-ed school up to class 10th
- KLS Public School (CBSE affiliated school)
- Middle School Makhdumpur, BSEB up to Class 8
