= Shramjeevi Superfast Express =

Train in India

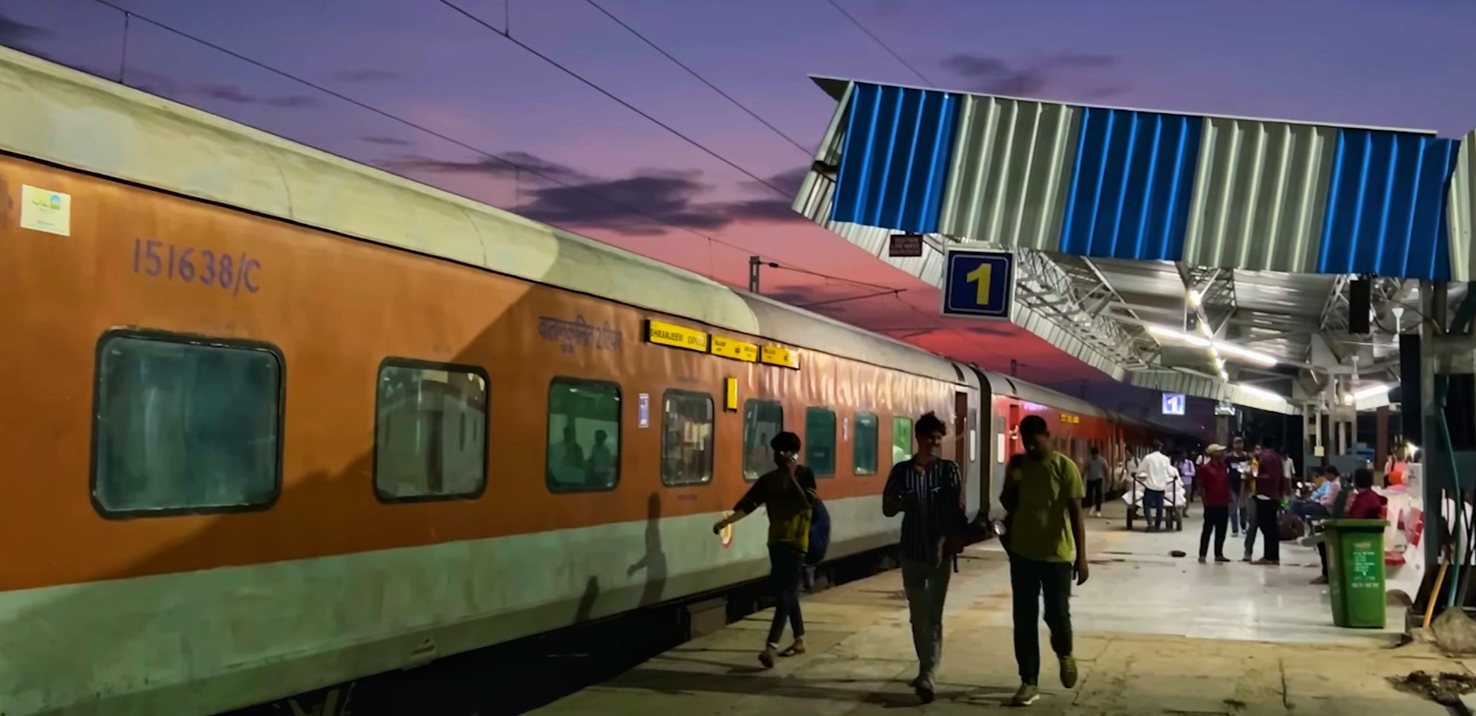
- Shramjeevi Superfast Express at Shahjahanpur Jn.

Overview
- Service type: Superfast
- Locale: Delhi, Uttar Pradesh & Bihar
- First service: 2 October 1990; 35 years ago
- Current operator: East Central Railway

Route
- Termini: Rajgir (RGD); New Delhi (NDLS)
- Stops: 32
- Distance travelled: 1,102 km (685 mi)
- Average journey time: 20 hrs 45 mins
- Service frequency: Daily
- Train number: 12391 / 12392

On-board services
- Classes: AC First Class, AC 2 Tier, AC 3 Tier, Sleeper Class, General Unreserved
- Seating arrangements: Yes
- Sleeping arrangements: Yes
- Catering facilities: Available
- Observation facilities: Large windows
- Baggage facilities: Available
- Other facilities: Below the seats

Technical
- Rolling stock: LHB coach
- Track gauge: 1,676 mm (5 ft 6 in)
- Operating speed: 54 km/h (34 mph) average including halts.

The 12391 / 12392 Shramjeevi Superfast Express is a daily superfast express train of Indian Railways, running between Rajgir, near Nalanda, Bihar, and New Delhi, the capital city of India. Previously it was running between Patna and New Delhi, later extended to Rajgir. The name Shramjeevi signifies the employee/worker, dependent on physical/mental labour (Shram) for their livelihood (Jeevi).

== History ==
- The train was first introduced between Patna Junction (PNBE) and New Delhi (NDLS) on 2 October 1991 (Gandhi Jayanti).
- Later Nalanda Express run in between Rajgir (RGD) and New Delhi (NDLS), which use to attach/detach with Shramjeevi Express at Patna Junction.
- Now whole rake runs between Rajgir (RGD) and New Delhi (NDLS), as Shramjeevi Express.
- Earlier the train belonged to Northern Railway with serial no as 2401/2402, now Rake belongs to East Central Railway, with serial number exchanged with Magadh Express.
- One of the few Indian Railways train used to be hauled by twin WDM-2 loco, now been replaced by WAP-4 or WAP-7.

== Numbers and times ==
- Train No. 12391 departs from Rajgir daily at 08:00 AM to arrive New Delhi at 04:45 AM next day; covering 1103 km in 20 hrs and 45 minutes
- Train No. 12392 departs from New Delhi daily at 01:10 PM to arrive Rajgir at 10:30 AM next day; covering 1103 km in 21:20 hrs

== Route and halts ==
The train runs from Rajgir via Nalanda, Bihar Sharif, Bakhtiyarpur Junction, Patna Sahib, Patna Junction, Danapur, Ara, Buxar, Pt. Deen Dayal Upadhyay Junction, Varanasi, Jaunpur, Sultanpur, Lucknow Charbagh, Shahjahanpur, Bareilly, Moradabad, Ghaziabad to New Delhi.

== Coach composition ==
The train generally consists of a total number of 22 LHB coach as follows:

- 1 AC First Class
- 2 AC II Tier
- 6 AC III Tier
- 1 Pantry Car
- 6 Sleeper Class
- 4 General Compartment
- 1 EoG cum Brake/Luggage van
- 1 SLR

== Traction ==
Both trains are hauled by a Ghaziabad Loco Shed or Tughlakabad Loco Shed-based WAP-7 electric locomotive from end to end.

== See also ==
- Dibrugarh Rajdhani Express
- Jaisalmer–Howrah Superfast Express
- Sampoorna Kranti Express
