= Rajgir–Mumbai LTT Janta Express =

Indian Railways passenger express train

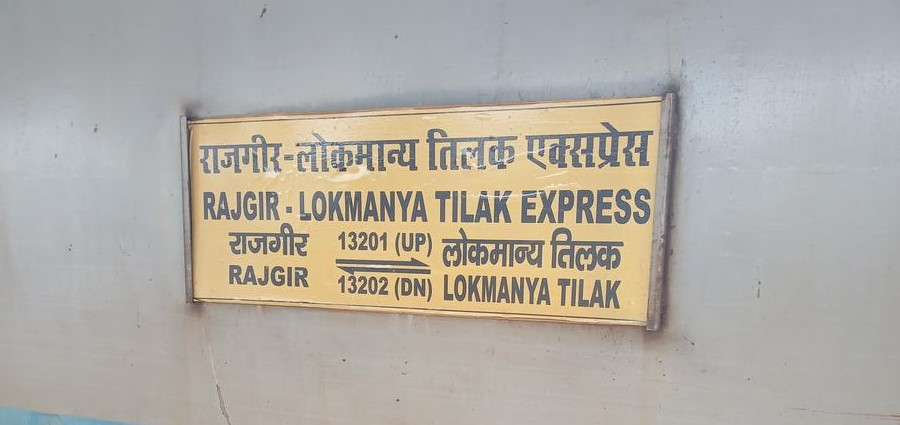
- Rajgir–Mumbai LTT Janta Express

Overview
- Service type: Express
- Current operator: East Central Railway zone

Route
- Termini: Rajgir (RGD); Lokmanya Tilak Terminus (LTT)
- Distance travelled: 1,690 km (1,050 mi)
- Average journey time: 38h 05m (13201), 36h 15m (13202)
- Service frequency: Daily
- Train number: 13201/13202

On-board services
- Classes: AC 1st Class, AC 2nd Tier, AC 3rd Tier, Sleeper Class, Unreserved
- Seating arrangements: No
- Sleeping arrangements: Yes
- Catering facilities: No

Technical
- Rolling stock: LHB coach
- Track gauge: 1,676 mm (5 ft 6 in)
- Operating speed: 130 km/h (81 mph) (maximum permissible)

The 13201/13202 Rajgir – Mumbai Lokmanya Tilak Terminus (LTT) Janta Express is a daily express train operated by Indian Railways, connecting Rajgir in Bihar with Lokmanya Tilak Terminus in Mumbai, Maharashtra.

== History ==
The train originally operated as the Rajendra Nagar Patna – Mumbai Lokmanya Tilak Terminus (LTT) Janta Express, with Rajendra Nagar Terminal, Patna, serving as its originating station for many years.

- According to railway records, the service commenced operations on 1 January 1998.
- In September 2025, Indian Railways extended the train’s origin from Patna to Rajgir to improve direct daily connectivity between the Nalanda–Rajgir region and Mumbai.
- The extension became operational on 26 September 2025.

== Schedule ==
13201 / 13202 Rajgir–Lokmanya Tilak Terminus Janta Express
Train Type	Janta Express / Express
Distance	~1948 km
Average Speed	~52 km/h
Journey Time (RGD → LTT)	~38 hrs 5 min
Journey Time (LTT → RGD)	~36 hrs 15 min
Classes Available	Sleeper (SL), AC 3-Tier (3A), General (GS)
Operating Days	RGD → LTT: Sunday; LTT → RGD: Tuesday
Operator	East Central Railway (ECR)

== Route and halts ==
13201 Rajgir–Lokmanya Tilak Terminus Janta Express / 13202 Lokmanya Tilak Terminus–Rajgir Janta Express
Sr.	13201 RGD–LTT	Day	Arr.	Dep.	13202 LTT–RGD	Day	Arr.	Dep.
1	Rajgir	1	—	20:45	Lokmanya Tilak Terminus	1	—	14:45
2	Patna Junction	1	23:45	23:55	Kalyan Junction	1	15:29	15:32
3	Ara Junction	2	00:48	00:53	Kasara	1	16:42	16:44
4	Buxar	2	01:56	02:01	Nasik Road	1	18:07	18:10
5	Pt. Deen Dayal Upadhyaya Junction	2	04:05	04:15	Manmad Junction	1	19:08	19:10
6	Prayagraj Chheoki	2	07:15	07:20	Bhusaval Junction	1	22:00	22:05
7	Jabalpur Junction	2	14:30	14:40	Itarsi Junction	2	03:40	03:50
8	Itarsi Junction	2	19:00	19:10	Khandwa Junction	2	00:22	00:25
9	Khandwa Junction	3	23:10	23:10	Bhusaval Junction	2	18:40	18:45
10	Bhusaval Junction	3	01:05	01:10	Manmad Junction	2	21:35	21:40
11	Manmad Junction	3	04:02	04:05	Nasik Road	2	05:20	05:25
12	Nasik Road	3	05:20	05:25	Kalyan Junction	3	09:29	09:32
13	Kalyan Junction	3	09:02	09:05	Lokmanya Tilak Terminus	3	10:50	—
14	Lokmanya Tilak Terminus	3	10:50	—	Rajgir	3	03:00	—

Note: Only major stations and junctions are listed here for clarity. In reality, this train halts at a total of 68 stations in both directions.

== Coach composition ==
Coach composition of the train
Category	Coaches	Total
AC First Class (1A)	H1	1
AC 2 Tier (2A)	A1, A2	2
AC 3 Tier (3A)	B1, B2, B3, B4	4
Sleeper Class (SL)	S1, S2, S3, S4, S5, S6, S7, S8, S9, S10, S11	11
General Unreserved (GS)	G1, G2	2
Luggage/Parcel Van (SLR)	SLR1, SLR2	2
Pantry Car (PC)	PC1	1
Total Coaches		23

- Primary Maintenance – Rajgir Coaching Depot

== Traction ==
Both trains are hauled by a Mughalsarai Electric Loco Shed-based WAP-4 or WAP-7 so was WCAM-3 electric locomotive from Rajgir to Prayagraj Cheoki Junction. From Prayagraj Cheoki Junction the train is pulled by WDP-4D or WDM-3A or WDM-3D or WDP-4B diesel locomotive of Itarsi Diesel Loco Shed until Itarsi Junction. From Itarsi Junction the train is pulled by WAP-4 electric locomotive of Itarsi Electric Loco Shed until Lokmanya Tilak Terminus.

== Train Accident ==
On 4 August 2015, two passenger trains – Kamayani Express and Janata Express – derailed near Kurawan and Bhringi railway station, 20 kilometres (12 mi) southwest of Harda, Madhya Pradesh.[1][2] At least 31 people were killed and 100 people were injured.

== See also ==
- Pawan Express
- Lokmanya Tilak Terminus–Chhapra Express
