= Nalanda railway station =

Railway station in Nalanda, Bihar, India

General information
- Location: NH 120, Nalanda, Bihar; India
- Coordinates: 25°12′16″N 85°32′23″E
- Elevation: 63 metres (207 ft)
- System: Indian Railways station
- Owner: Indian Railways
- Operator: East Central Railway zone
- Line: Bakhtiyarpur–Rajgir–Gaya
- Platforms: 2
- Tracks: 2
- Connections: Bihar Sharif; Rajgir

Construction
- Structure type: Standard (on-ground station)
- Parking: Available

Other information
- Status: Functioning
- Station code: NLD
- Zone(s): East Central Railway
- Division(s): Danapur division

History
- Opened: 1911
- Electrified: Yes(2017)
Location
- Location within Bihar

Nalanda railway station (station code: NLD), is a railway station and under Danapur railway division of East Central Railway. Nalanda is connected to metropolitan areas of India, by the Delhi–Kolkata main line via Mugalsarai–Patna route. Station is located in Nalanda city in Nalanda district in the Indian state of Bihar. Due to its location on the Bakhtiyarpur–Tilaiya main line many Patna and other cities via Express trains coming from Rajgir and Gaya Junction stop here. It has two platforms. However, the station was news in December 2024 for allegedly lacking basic facilities.

== History ==
Nalanda city has incredible history from the past. Mainly because Nalanda university was founded in 427 CE and is one of the oldest university of the world and was a very important center of the world for higher education. Many student from across the world used to come here to get quality education. Surjarpur(sun temple) and kundalpur(Birth place of Lord mahavira) are the place in city which is important pilgrim centre of Hindus and Jain respectively.

== Location ==
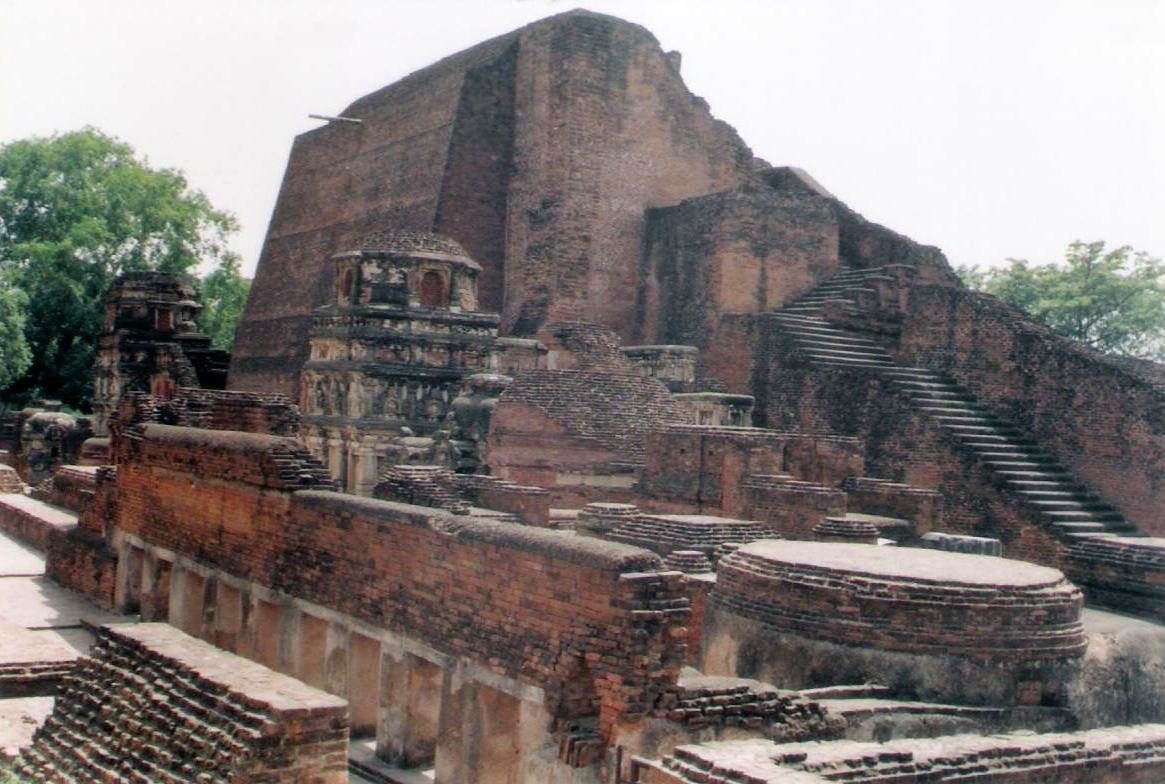
The Ruins of Nalanda mahavihara

As Nalanda a historical and Buddhist & Jainism pilgrims center. City well connected by rail and road network. It's 85 km southeast from Patna and (80 km) northeast of Gaya, India, (20 km) from Pawapuri and 105 km from Vaishali (ancient city) .

== Important trains ==
These important trains pass through the station.

- Mahaparinirvan Express The Buddhist Circuit Train which is popularly known as Mahaparinirvan Express is a tourist train, which was launched by IRCTC on March 28, 2007, to attract Buddhist pilgrims. Connects Rajgir, Nalanda, Patliputra, Varanasi, Bodhgaya, Sarnath, Vaishali (ancient city), Kushinagar etc.
- Shramjeevi Express connects Rajgir, Patna, Varanasi, Lucknow and New Delhi.
- Budhpurnima Express Also a Buddhist special train runs between Rajgir to Varanasi vai Patna and Gaya, India.
- Rajgriha Intercity Express runs between Rajgir and Danapur via Harnaut, Patna City.
- Howrah–Rajgir Janta Express connects Rajgir to Howrah via Asansol Jhajha Bakhtiyarpur.
- Howrah–Rajgir Fast Passenger to Howrah Junction from Rajgir railway station via Bakhtiyarpur Junction, Kiul railway station, Bhagalpur railway station, Barddhaman.

== Nearest airport ==
Nearest airports are:

- Lok Nayak Jayaprakash Airport, Patna
- Gaya Airport

== See also ==
- Nalanda
