= Khusropur railway station =

Railway station in Patna, Bihar, India

General information
- Location: Khusropur, Patna, Bihar; India
- Coordinates: 25°29′6″N 85°23′15″E
- Elevation: 59 metres (194 ft)
- System: Indian Railways station
- Line: Howrah–Delhi main line
- Platforms: 2
- Tracks: 4

Construction
- Structure type: Standard (on-ground station)

Other information
- Status: Functioning
- Station code: KOO
- Zone(s): East Central Railway
- Division(s): Danapur Division

History
- Former names: East Indian Railway
Location

Khusropur Station (station code: KOO), is a railway station in the Danapur railway division of East Central Railway. Khusropur is connected to metropolitan areas of India, by the Delhi–Kolkata main line via Mugalsarai–Patna route. Khusropur is located in Patna district in the Indian state of Bihar. Due to its location on the Howrah–Patna–Mughalsarai main line many Patna, Barauni bound express trains coming from Howrah, Sealdah stop here.

== Facilities ==
The major facilities available are waiting rooms, vehicle parking. The vehicles are allowed to enter the station premises. The station also has STD/ISD/PCO Telephone booth, toilets, tea stall and book stall.

=== Platforms ===
There are two platforms which are interconnected with a foot overbridge (FOB).

== Trains ==
Many passenger and express trains serve Khusropur Station.

== Nearest airport ==
The nearest airports to Khusropur Station are:

1. Lok Nayak Jayaprakash Airport, Patna 36 kilometres (22 mi)
2. Gorakhpur Airport, Gorakhpur 268 kilometres (167 mi)
3. Gaya Airport 105 kilometres (65 mi)
4. Netaji Subhash Chandra Bose International Airport, Kolkata
