= Budhpurnima Express =

Train in India

Overview
- Service type: Express
- Status: Operating
- Locale: Bihar & Uttar Pradesh
- First service: 12 October 2002; 23 years ago
- Current operator: Northern Railway

Route
- Termini: Rajgir (RGD); Banaras (BSBS)
- Stops: 21
- Distance travelled: 414 km (257 mi)
- Average journey time: 9 hours 25 minutes
- Service frequency: Daily
- Train number: 14223 / 14224

On-board services
- Classes: Second Class Seating, AC 3 Tier ,AC 3 Tier Economy, Sleeper Class, General Unreserved
- Seating arrangements: Yes
- Sleeping arrangements: No
- Catering facilities: E-catering
- Observation facilities: Large windows
- Baggage facilities: Available
- Other facilities: Below the seats

Technical
- Rolling stock: LHB coach
- Track gauge: 1,676 mm (5 ft 6 in)
- Operating speed: 45 km/h (28 mph) average including halts.
Route map
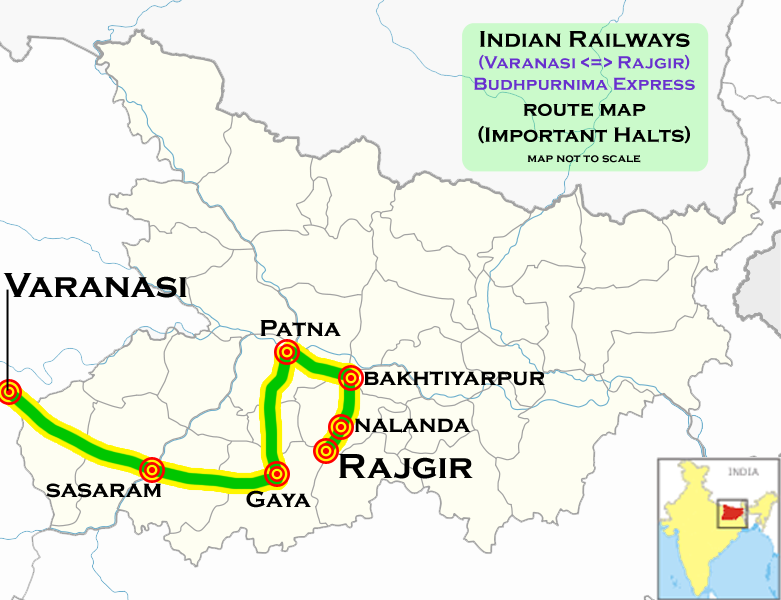

The 14223 / 14224 Budhpurnima Express is an express train of Northern Railway zone of Indian Railways. It runs between major "Buddhist Hubs" such as Rajgir, Pawapuri, Nalanda, Patna, Gaya, Varanasi/Sarnath cities in Bihar and Uttar Pradesh. It is operated between Rajgir and Varanasi cities of India.

== Routing ==
The trains run from Rajgir to Banaras(earlier Varanasi Junction)via Nalanda, Bihar Sharif Junction, Harnaut, Bakhtiyarpur Junction, Patna Junction, Gaya Junction, Guraru, Jehanabad, Sasaram Junction, Dehri On Sone, Pt. Deen Dayal Upadhyay Junction and Banaras .From March 2024, the train had a new stop at Karamnasa.

== See also ==
- Vibhuti Express
- Doon Express
- North East Express
