= Jehanabad railway station =

Railway station in Jehanabad, Bihar, India

General information
- Location: Station Road, Jehanabad, Bihar; India
- Coordinates: 25.2251°N 84.9902°E
- Elevation: 66 metres (217 ft)
- System: Indian Railway
- Owner: East Central Railway of the Indian Railways
- Operator: Indian Railways
- Line: Patna–Gaya line
- Platforms: 3
- Tracks: 4

Construction
- Structure type: Standard (on-ground station)
- Parking: Available

Other information
- Status: Functioning
- Station code: JHD
- Zone(s): East Central Railway
- Division(s): Danapur

History
- Opened: 1905; 121 years ago
- Electrified: 2002–2003; 23 years ago
- Former names: East Indian Railways

Passengers
- 20,000 per day
Location

Jehanabad railway station (station code: JHD), is the railway station serving the city of Jehanabad in the Jehanabad district in the Indian state of Bihar. The Jehanabad railway station is well connected to Patna, Gaya, Ranchi and Bokaro by the railway network.

Jehanabad lies in between Patna–Gaya line which is one of the busiest rail route in India. Jehanabad has trains running frequently to Patna and Ranchi. The city is a major railway hub and has four stations Jehanabad railway station, Jehanabad Court, Makhdumpur–Gaya and Tehta. Jehanabad is well connected with Gaya, Patna, Biharsharif, Rajgir, Islampur and Jhajha through daily passenger and express train services.

In 2025, the "chakka jam" protest, which is against the Special Intensive Revision (SIR) in the state, blocked Jehanabad's railway tracks.

== Facilities ==
The Jehanabad Station is in the East Central Railway zone, with Station Grade D. It has 18 unique weekly trains, but is only operating 11% of the amount of trains since the COVID-19 pandemic. There are 3 platforms at Jehanabad railway station.
