= Rajgir railway station =

Railway station in Nalanda, Bihar, India

RAJGIR राजगीर راجگیر

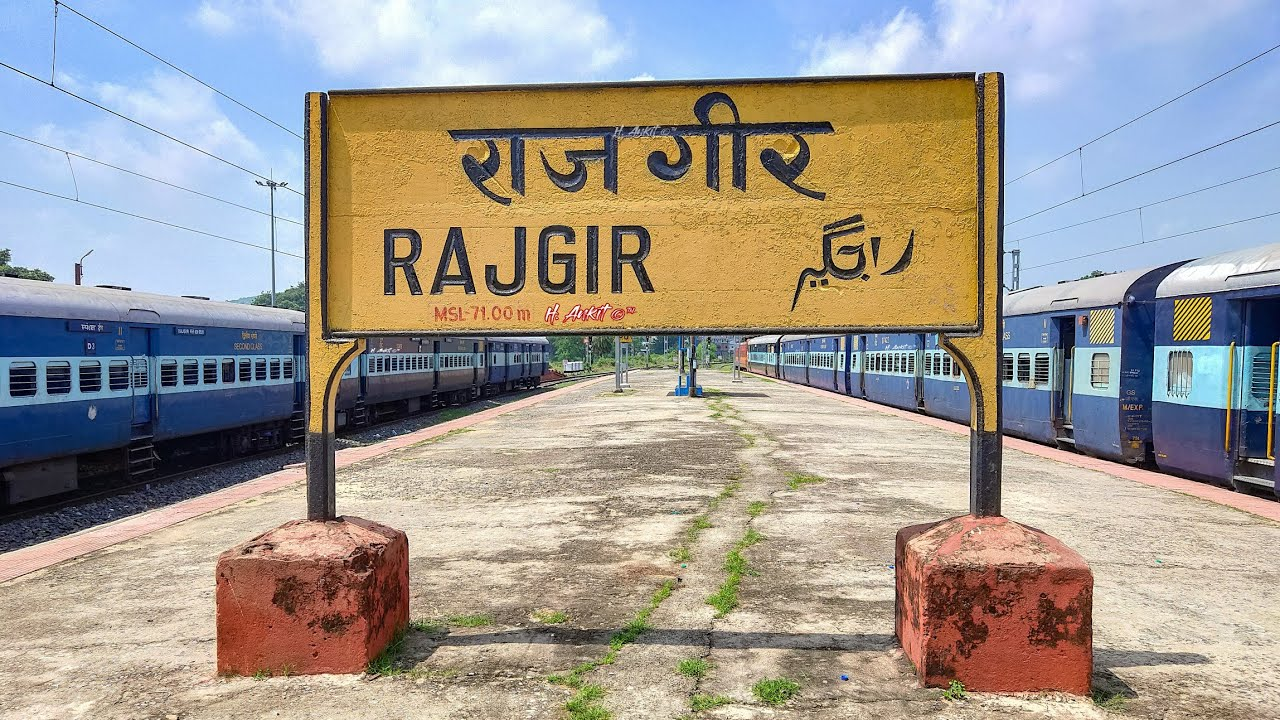
- Station platform board

General information
- Location: Rajgir station rd, NH 120, Rajgir, Bihar; India
- Coordinates: 25.033°N 85.415°E
- Elevation: 71 metres (233 ft)
- System: Indian Railways station
- Owner: Indian Railways
- Operator: East Central Railway zone
- Line: Bakhtiarpur–Rajgir–Tilaiya line Bakhtiarpur–Rajgir–Gaya Bakhtiarpur–Rajgir–Koderma (UC)
- Platforms: 3
- Tracks: 5

Construction
- Structure type: Standard (on-ground station)
- Parking: Available

Other information
- Status: Functional
- Station code: RGD
- Zone(s): East Central Railway zone
- Division(s): Danapur

History
- Opened: 1962; 64 years ago
- Electrified: 2016–2017; 9 years ago
Route map
- Sources
Location
- Location within India Location within Bihar
- Interactive map of Rajgir

Rajgir railway station (station code: RGD), is a railway station serving the city of Rajgir, Nalanda district in the Indian state of Bihar. Rajgir is in the Danapur railway division of the East Central Railway zone. Rajgir is well connected with Patna Junction, Harnaut, Koderma, Bihar Sharif, Gaya Junction, Fatuha, Tilaiya Junction and Bakhtiyarpur Junction through daily passenger and express train services. It is located near Jawahar Navodaya Vidyalaya Rajgir Nalanda.

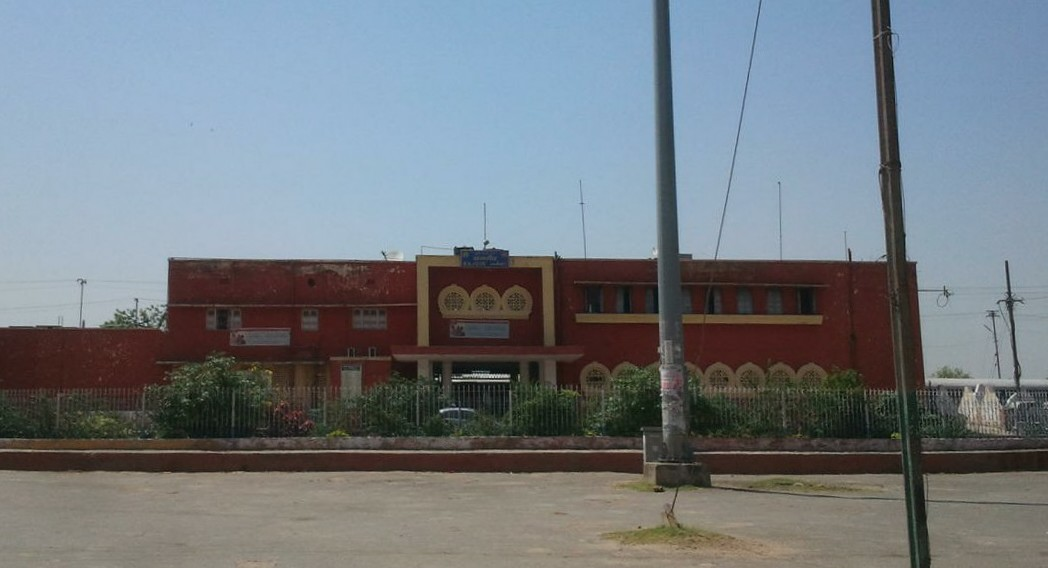
Building structure

== History ==
Bakhtiarpur–Bihar Light Railway was a 2 ft 6 in (762 mm)-wide narrow-gauge railway laid by Martin's Light Railways from Bakhtiarpur to Bihar Sharif in 1903 and extended to Rajgir in 1911. It was taken over by the local district board in 1950, nationalised in 1962, and converted to 1,676 mm (5 ft 6 in).

The broad-gauge line was extended from Rajgir to Tilaiya and opened in 2010. This line will transport coal from the Hazaribagh–Koderma coal belt for the Barh Thermal Power Station via Harnaut railway station. The line was sanctioned in 2001–02 and is to be extended up to Koderma.

== Facilities ==
The major facilities available are waiting rooms, retiring room, computerised reservation facility, reservation counter, and vehicle parking. The vehicles are allowed to enter the station premises. There are refreshment rooms, vegetarian and non-vegetarian, tea stall, book stall, post and telegraphic office and Government Railway Police (G.R.P.) office. Automatic ticket vending machines have been installed to reduce the queue for train tickets at the station.

=== Platform ===
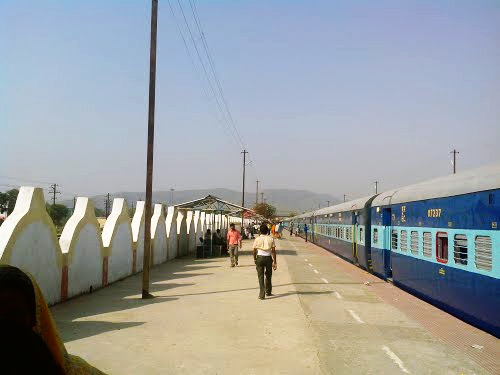
Railway platform

There are three platforms at the Rajgir railway station. The platforms are interconnected with foot overbridges (FOB). It has two foot overbridges, the third overbridge is under construction.

== Trains ==
Rajgir railway station is a major station of the East Central Railway. Several local passenger trains also run from Rajgir to neighbouring destinations at frequent intervals. The following table lists all the trains passing from Rajgir station: Updated July 2026

Originating/Passing trains
Number	Train type	From	To	Train name
12391/12392	Superfast	Rajgir	New Delhi	Shramjeevi Superfast Express
12301/12302	Express	Rajgir	Lokmanya Tilak Terminus	Rajgir–Mumbai LTT Janta Express
12947/12948	Superfast	Rajgir	Ahmedabad	Azimabad Express
13233/13234	Express	Koderma	Danapur	Rajgriha Express
14223/14224	Superfast	Rajgir	Varanasi	Budhpurnima Express
13353/13354	Express	Rajgir	Patna	Rajgir–Patna Intercity Express
53044/53043	Express	Rajgir	Howrah	Howrah–Rajgir Fast Passenger
53221/53222	Passenger	Rajgir	Bakhtiyarpur	Rajgir–Bakhtiyarpur Passenger
52223/53224	Passenger	Rajgir	Bakhtiyarpur	Rajgir–Bakhtiyarpur Passenger
53226/53225	Passenger	Gaya	Bakhtiyarpur	Gaya–Bakhtiyarpur Passenger
53231/53232	Passenger	Danapur	Tilaiya	Danapur–Tilaiya Passenger
63329/63330	MEMU	Rajgir	Fatuha	Rajgir–Fatuha MEMU via Bihar Sharif, Daniyawa
63339/63340	MEMU	Rajgir	Danapur	Rajgir–Danapur MEMU
63383/63384	MEMU	Vaishali	Koderma	Vaishali-Koderma Fast MEMU
63273/63274	MEMU	Rajgir	Patna	Rajgir-Patna Fast MEMU

== Nearest airport ==
Airports near Rajgir are:

- Jay Prakash Narayan Airport, Patna (99.5 km)
- Gaya International Airport, Gaya (75.2 km)
- Rajgir International Airport, Rajgir: Planned

In February 2012, the Indian Railways had planned to set up a Railway Station Development Corporation (RSDC) to work on improving the major railway stations, including Rajgir railway station, by building and developing restaurants, shopping areas, and food plazas for commercial business and improving passenger amenities.
