= Bhabua Road railway station =

Railway station in Kaimur, Bihar, India

Bhabhua Road Junction
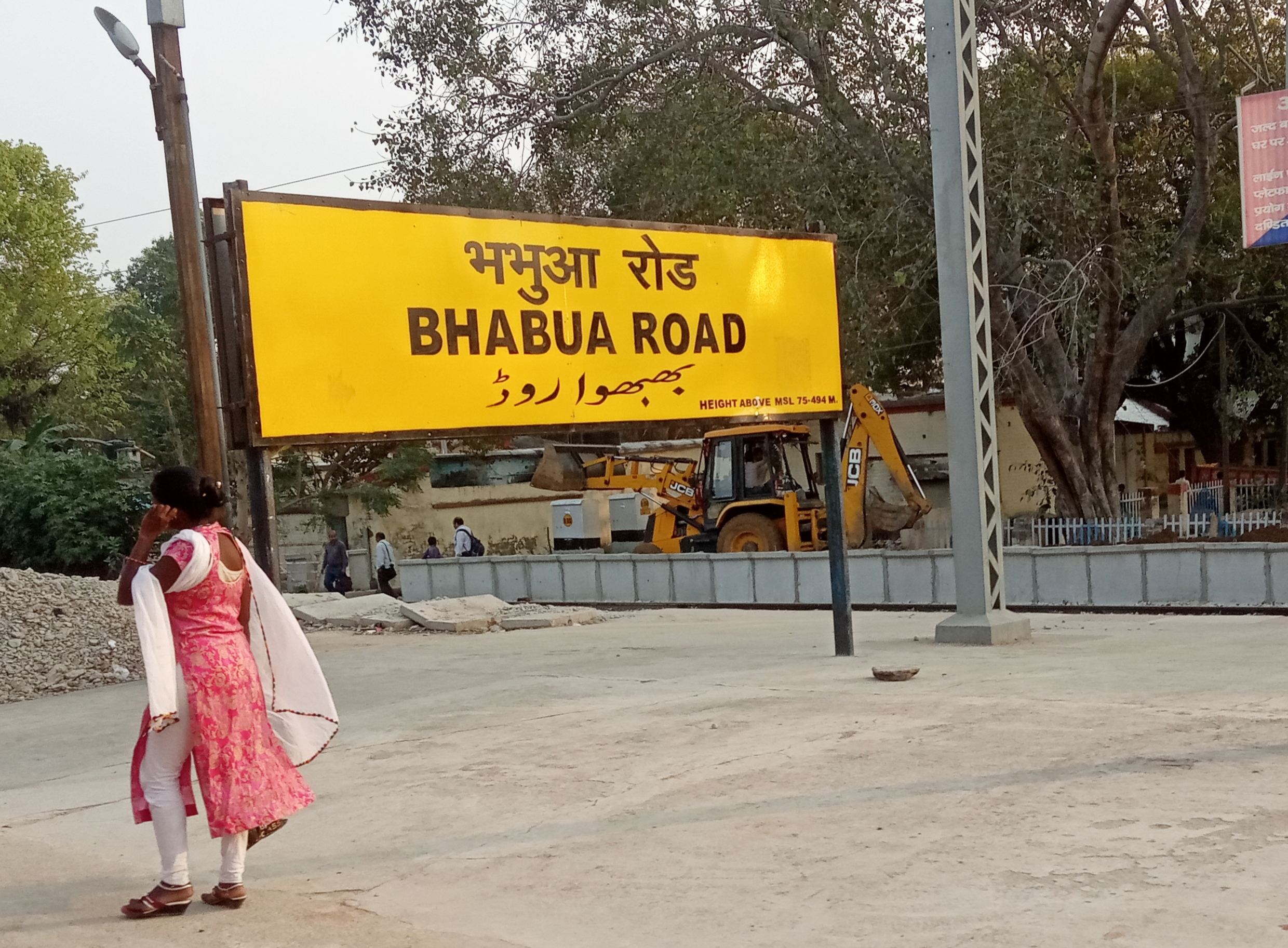

General information
- Location: Mohania, Kaimur, Bihar; India
- Coordinates: 25.1728°N 83.6173°E
- System: Junction Indian Railways station
- Owner: Indian Railways
- Operator: East Central Railway Zone
- Line: Gaya–Pandit Deen Dayal Upadhyaya Junction section
- Distance: 16.50 km (10.25 mi) from Bhabua
- Platforms: 5
- Tracks: 6+2(DFC)
- Train operators: 2
- Connections: Delhi-Howrah Line Gaya-DDU Line Gaya-Delhi Line Gaya-Patna Line Gaya-Kiul Line Arrah-Sasaram Line Arrah-Patna Line

Construction
- Structure type: Standard (On ground station)
- Parking: Available
- Cycle facilities: Yes
- Accessible: Yes

Other information
- Status: Functional
- Station code: BBU
- Zone(s): East Central Railway zone
- Division(s): Pandit Deen Dayal Upadhyaya
- Fare zone: East Central Railway

History
- Former names: East Indian Railway Company; Eastern Railway zone
Route map
Location
- Location within Bihar Location within India

Bhabhua Road Junction (IRCTC code BBU) is a railway station on the Grand Chord line on the outskirts of Mohania, 10.25 miles (16.50 km) from Bhabua in Kaimur district of the Indian state of Bihar. It is also on the route of the Grand Trunk Road. It has five platforms. It is a B Grade station in Kaimur district recognised by Railway of India. As of 2022, over 70+ trains from various starting stations pass through the station daily.

A new Rail Line from Bhabhua Road Junction to Ara Junction and Bhabhua Road Junction to Maa Mundeshwari Dham (via Bhabua City) is under construction. And An other Rail Line from Bhabhua Road Junction To Dildarnagar Junction via Ramgarh is Proposed.

== Station details ==
The station is the only major one in the district and lies on the Howrah–New Delhi Grand Chord in the Mughalsarai region. Its station code is "BBU".

== Train details ==
Train name (no.)	Station from/to	Arrival	Departure
Ranchi Garib Rath (12877)	RANCHI (RNC) – DELHI (NDLS)	00:46	00:48
Kolkata Mail (12322)	MUMBAI (CSTM) – KOLKATA (HWH)	00:50	00:52
Parasnath Express (12942)	ASANSOL (ASN) – BHAVNAGAR (BVC)	01:47	01:48
New Delhi Ranchi Garib Rath (12878)	DELHI (NDLS) – RANCHI (RNC)	02:00	02:02
Gangasutlej Express (13307)	DHANBAD (DHN) – FIROZPUR (FZR)	02:56	02:57
Mahabodhi Express (12398)	DELHI (NDLS) – GAYA (GAYA)	03:26	03:28
Bhavnagar Trmus Asansol Express (12941)	BHAVNAGAR (BVC) – ASANSOL (ASN)	03:36	03:38
Chambal Express (12177)	KOLKATA (HWH) – MATHURA (MTJ)	03:43	03:44
Chambal Express (12175)	KOLKATA (HWH) – GWALIOR (GWL)	03:43	03:44
Shipra Express (22912)	KOLKATA (HWH) – INDORE (INDB)	03:43	03:44
Sealdah Express (13152)	JAMMU (JAT) – KOLKATA (KOAA)	03:50	03:52
Bhabua Road Patna Intcity (13244)	BHABUA (BBU) – PATNA (PNBE)	–	04:15
Gomti Nagar - Malda Town Amrit Bharat Express (13436)	GOMTI NAGAR (GTNR) - MALDA TOWN (MLDT)	04:18	04:20
Netaji Express (12311)	KOLKATA (HWH) – KALKA (KLK)	04:50	04:51
Mughal Sarai Gaya Passenger (53614)	KOLKATA (MGS) – GAYA (GAYA)	05:01	05:02
Neelachal Express (12875)	PURI (PURI) – DELHI (NDLS)	05:16	05:17
Ranchi Lokmanyatilak T Express (18609)	RANCHI (RNC) – MUMBAI (LTT)	05:15	05:17
Ajmer Sealdah Express (12988)	AJMER (AII) – KOLKATA (SDAH)	05:43	05:45
Jalianwala B Express (18103)	TATANAGAR (TATA) – AMRITSAR (ASR)	06:05	06:06
Dikshabhoomi Express (11045)	KOLHAPUR (KOP) – DHANBAD (DHN)	06:28	06:30
Budh Purnima Express (15109)	RAJGIR (RGD) – VARANASI (BSB)	06:31	06:32
Ranchi Varanasi Express (18611)	RANCHI (RNC) – VARANASI (BSB)	06:46	06:48
Ranchi Garibnwaz Express (18631)	RANCHI (RNC) – AJMER (AII)	06:47	06:48
Sambalpur Varanasi Express (18311)	SAMBALPUR (SBP) – VARANASI (BSB)	06:47	06:48
Varanasi Asansol Passenger (53522)	VARANASI (BSB) – ASANSOL (ASN)	06:50	06:51
Poorva Express (12382)	DELHI (NDLS) – KOLKATA (HWH)	07:13	07:15
Malda Town - Gomti Nagar Amrit Bharat Express (13435)	MALDA TOWN (MLDT) – GOMTI NAGAR (GTNR)	07:16	07:18
Sasaram Garib Rath (22410)	DELHI (ANVT) – GAYA (GAYA)	07:18	07:20
Doon Express (13009)	KOLKATA (HWH) – DEHRADUN (DDN)	07:23	07:24
Howrah Mumbai Mail (12321)	KOLKATA (HWH) – MUMBAI (CSTM)	07:34	07:35
Jharkhand Express (12818)	DELHI (ANVT) – HATIA (HTE)	07:39	07:41
Gaya Chennai Egmore Express (12389)	GAYA (GAYA) – CHENNAI (MS)	07:43	07:44
Sealdah Ajmer Express (12987)	KOLKATA (SDAH) – AJMER (AII)	08:20	08:21
Howrah Jodhpur Express (12307)	KOLKATA (HWH) – JODHPUR (JU)	08:31	08:32
Varanasi Barka Kana Passenger (53362)	VARANASI (BSB) – BARKA KANA (BRKA)	09:12	09:13
Bhabua Road Patna Intercity (13250)	BHABUA (BBU) – PATNA (PNBE)	–	11:00
Purshottam Express (12802)	DELHI (NDLS) – PURI (PURI)	11:13	11:15
Dehri On Sone Mughal Sarai Passenger (53609)	DELHI (DOS) – PURI (MGS)	11:23	11:24
Jalianwala B Express (18104)	AMRITSAR (ASR) – TATANAGAR (TATA)	12:14	12:16
Barka Kana Varanasi Passenger (53361)	BARKA KANA (BRKA) – VARANASI (BSB)	14:11	14:12
Purushottam Express (12801)	PURI (PURI) – DELHI (NDLS)	15:59	16:01
Mahabodhi Express (12397)	GAYA (GAYA) – DELHI (NDLS)	16:31	16:32
Varanasi Ranchi Express (18612)	VARANASI (BSB) – RANCHI (RNC)	16:41	16:43
Varanasi Sambalpur Express (18312)	VARANASI (BSB) – SAMBALPUR (SBP)	16:41	16:43
Ranchi Garib Nawaz (18632)	AJMER (AII) – RANCHI (RNC)	16:41	16:43
Poorva Express (12381)	KOLKATA (HWH) – DELHI (NDLS)	16:49	16:50
Asn Anvt Special (03517)	ASANSOL (ASN) – DELHI (ANVT)	17:00	17:02
Mughal Sarai Dehri On Sone Passenger (53610)	ASANSOL (MGS) – DEHRI ON SONE (DOS)	17:03	17:04
Bikaner Howrah Supfast (22308)	BIKANER (BKN) – KOLKATA (HWH)	17:44	17:46
Jodhpur Howrah Supfast (12308)	JODHPUR (JU) – KOLKATA (HWH)	17:44	17:46
Ara Mughal Sarai Passenger (54271)	JODHPUR (ARA) – KOLKATA (MGS)	17:58	17:59
Doon Express (13010)	DEHRADUN (DDN) – KOLKATA (HWH)	18:29	18:31
Doon Express (23010)	KOTDWARA (KTW) – KOLKATA (HWH)	18:29	18:31
Dikshabhumi Express (11046)	DHANBAD (DHN) – KOLHAPUR (KOP)	18:52	18:53
Asansol Varanasi Passenger (53521)	ASANSOL (ASN) – VARANASI (BSB)	19:02	19:03
Chennai Egmore Gaya Express (12390)	CHENNAI (MS) – GAYA (GAYA)	19:33	19:34
Mughal Sarai Ara Passenger (54272)	CHENNAI (MGS) – ARA (ARA)	20:20	20:21
Chambal Express (12178)	MATHURA (MTJ) – KOLKATA (HWH)	20:53	20:55
Chambal Express (12176)	GWALIOR (GWL) – KOLKATA (HWH)	20:53	20:55
Shipra Express (22911)	INDORE (INDB) – KOLKATA (HWH)	20:53	20:55
Kalka Mail (12312)	KALKA (KLK) – KOLKATA (HWH)	21:04	21:06
Ranchi Express (18610)	MUMBAI (LTT) – RANCHI (RNC)	21:32	21:35
Gaya Mughal Sarai Passenger (53613)	MUMBAI (GAYA) – RANCHI (MGS)	21:41	21:42
Anand Vihar Trm Garib Rath (22409)	GAYA (GAYA) – DELHI (ANVT)	21:47	21:48
Neelachal Express (12876)	DELHI (NDLS) – PURI (PURI)	21:58	22:00
Budhpurnima Express (15110)	VARANASI (BSB) – RAJGIR (RGD)	22:12	22:14
Gangasatluj Express (13308)	FIROZPUR (FZR) – DHANBAD (DHN)	22:50	22:52
Jammu Tawi Express (13151)	KOLKATA (KOAA) – JAMMU (JAT)	23:38	23:39
Anand Vihar Asansol Special (03518)	DELHI (ANVT) – ASANSOL (ASN)	23:45	23:47
Koaa Anvtspecia (03125)	KOLKATA (KOAA) – DELHI (ANVT)	23:50	23:52
Jharkhand Singaji Express (12817)	HATIA (HTE) – DELHI (ANVT)	23:53	23:54
Patna Bhabua Road Intcity (13243)	PATNA (PNBE) – BHABUA (BBU)	23:30	-

Source: yatra.com
