= National Highway 83 (India, old numbering) =

Old numbering of road in India

National Highway 83
- Map of Old National Highway 83 in red

Route information
- Length: 130 km (81 mi)

Major junctions
- North end: Patna, Bihar
- South end: Dobhi, Bihar at intersection of NH 2

Location
- Country: India
- States: Bihar: 130 km (81 mi)
- Primary destinations: Jehanabad - Gaya - Bodhgaya

Highway system
- Roads in India; Expressways; National; State; Asian
← NH 82	→ NH 84

National Highway 83 (NH 83) was a former National Highway in India entirely within the state of Bihar. NH 83 linked state capital, Patna (of Bihar) to Dobhi on former National Highway 2 (new NH 19) and passed through Jehanabad, Gaya and Bodhgaya. The total length of NH 83 was about 130 km (81 mi). In 2010, the highway was renumbered to form part of present-day NH 22, with NH 83 now used for a national highway located in the state of Tamil Nadu.

== See also ==
- National highways of India
- List of national highways in India
- National Highways Development Project
