= Patna–Gaya line =

Railway line in India

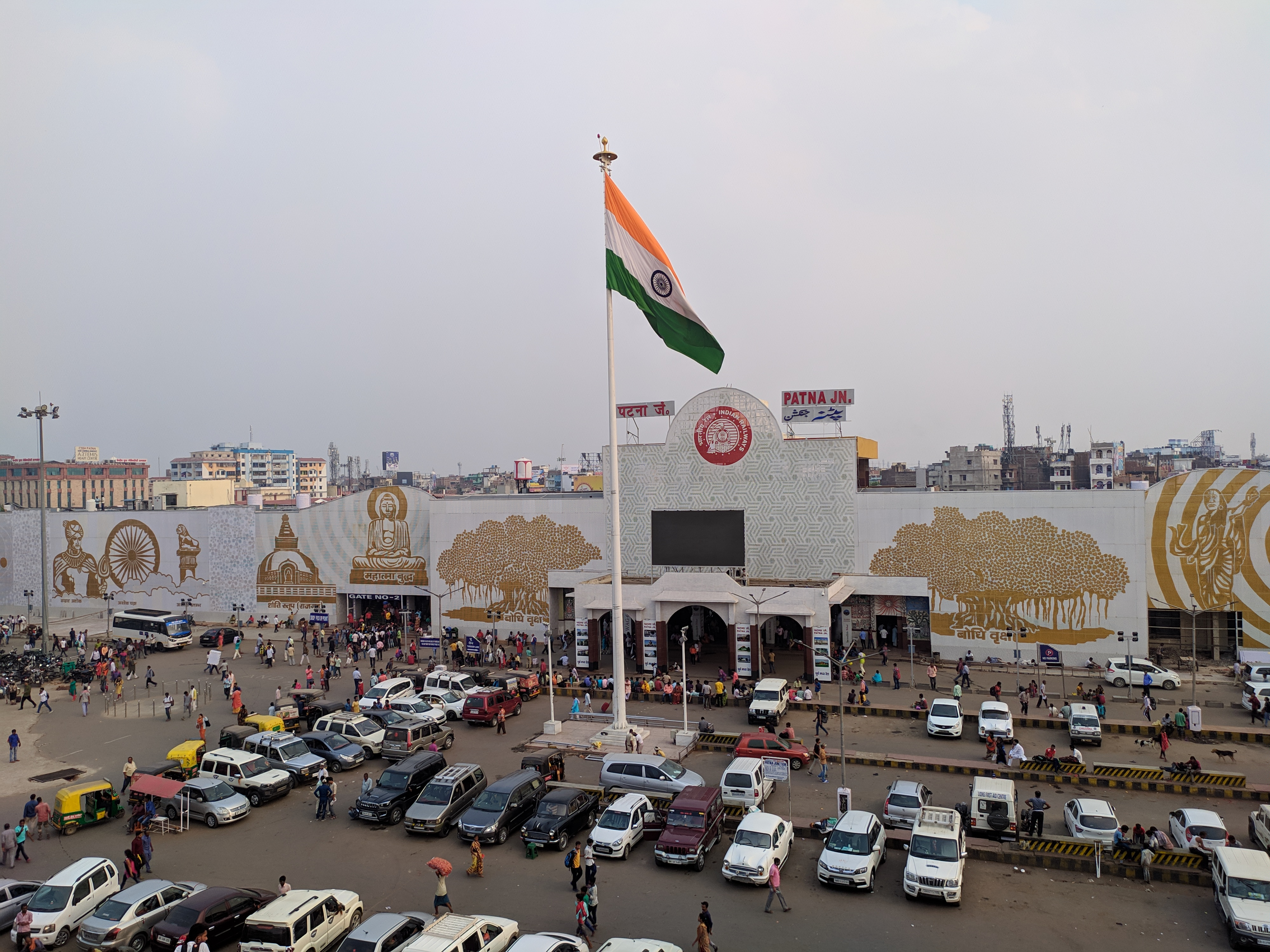
- Patna Junction, an important railway station on Patna–Gaya line

Overview
- Status: Operational
- Owner: Indian Railways
- Termini: Patna; Gaya

Service
- Operator: East Central Railway

History
- Opened: 1900

Technical
- Line length: 92 km (57 mi)
- Track gauge: 5 ft 6 in (1,676 mm) broad gauge
- Electrification: 25 kV 50 Hz AC OHLE in 2003.
- Operating speed: 75 km/h (47 mph)

The Patna–Gaya line is a railway line connecting Patna on the Howrah–Delhi main line and Gaya on the Howrah–Gaya–Delhi line both in the Indian state of Bihar.

== History ==
Gaya was connected to Patna in 1900 by East Indian Railway Company.

== Electrification ==
The Gaya–Jahanabad sector was electrified in 2002–2003. Electrification of the Patna–Gaya line was completed in 2003.

== Passenger movement ==
Patna and Gaya, on this line, are amongst the top hundred booking stations of Indian Railway.

== Railway reorganisation ==
In 1952, Eastern Railway, Northern Railway and North Eastern Railway were formed. Eastern Railway was formed with a portion of East Indian Railway Company, east of Mughalsarai and Bengal Nagpur Railway. Northern Railway was formed with a portion of East Indian Railway Company west of Mughalsarai, Jodhpur Railway, Bikaner Railway and Eastern Punjab Railway. North Eastern Railway was formed with Oudh and Tirhut Railway, Assam Railway and a portion of Bombay, Baroda and Central India Railway. East Central Railway was created in 1996–97.

== Trains ==
The following trains serves this region

- Patna-Ranchi Jan Shatabdi Express
- Patna-Ranchi Vande Bharat Express
- Kosi Express
- Patna-Tatanagar Vande Bharat Express
- Patna-Bhabua Road Intercity Express
- Patna-Singrauli Express
- Palamu Express
- Islampur-Hatia Express
- Ganga Damodar Express
- Budhpurnima Express

While There are also a lot of Passenger and Express trains that serves this section.

== See also ==
- Patna–Digha Ghat line
