= Harnaut railway station =

Railway station in Nalanda, Bihar, India

Harnaut Railway Station
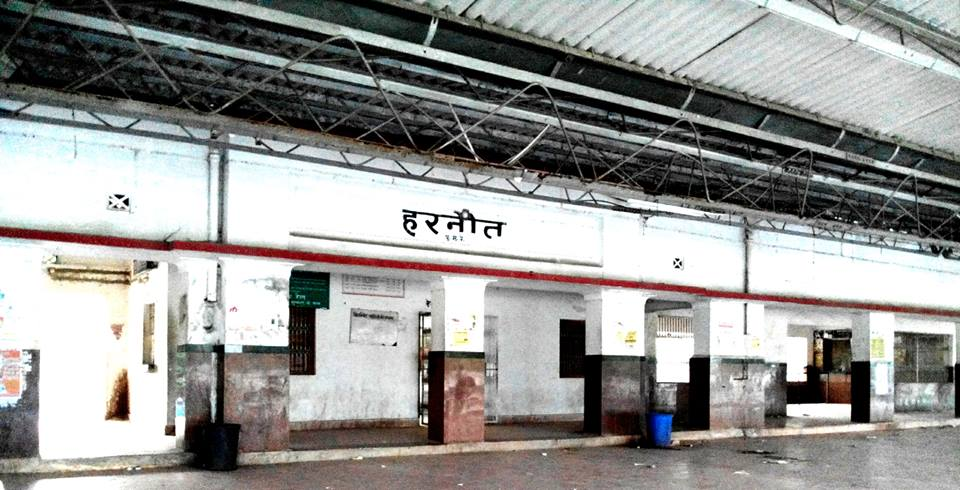
- Harnaut station interior view

General information
- Location: Station Rd NH 31, Harnaut, Bihar; India
- Coordinates: 25°22′18″N 85°32′26″E
- Elevation: 49 metres (161 ft)
- System: Indian railway station
- Owner: Indian Railways
- Operator: East Central Railway zone
- Lines: Harnaut–Mokama section, Bakhtiyarpur–Rajgir–Tilaiya, Bakhtiyarpur–Rajgir–Gaya
- Platforms: 3
- Tracks: 4
- Connections: Bakhtiyarpur; Barh; Rajgir

Construction
- Structure type: Standard (on-ground station)
- Parking: Available
- Accessible: Disabled access

Other information
- Status: Functioning
- Station code: HRT
- Zone(s): East Central Railway zone
- Division(s): Danapur

History
- Opened: 1903; 123 years ago
- Rebuilt: 2003; 23 years ago
- Electrified: 2016–2017

Passengers
- 2015: ≈ 5.5 lakh per

Services
Preceding station	Indian Railways	Following station
East Central Railway
Kharuara Halt towards ?	Bakhtiyarpur–Tilaiya line Towards Rajgir, Bihar Sharif	wena towards ?
Location

Harnaut station is a railway station in India. It is a station in the city of Harnaut, and is situated on the Bakhtiyarpur–Tilaiya line route passing through Nalanda. Its service records traffic of more than 1,500 passengers, and more than 25 trains per day. The Harnaut station is connected to most of the major cities in India by the railway network. Harnaut has well connected trains running frequently to New Delhi railway station, Patna Junction, Varanasi Junction, and Howrah Junction. Harnaut is well connected with Gaya Junction, Bihar Sharif Junction, Rajgir railway station, Tilaiya railway station, Bhagalpur railway station, and Kiul Junction through daily passenger and express train services.

== History ==
Bakhtiyarpur Bihar Light Railway was a 2 ft 6 in (762 mm)-wide narrow-gauge railway laid by Martin's Light Railways from Bakhtiarpur to Bihar Sharif in 1903 and extended to Rajgir in 1911. It was taken over by the local district board in 1950, nationalised in 1962 and converted to 1,676 mm (5 ft 6 in).

The broad-gauge line was extended from Rajgir to Tilaiya and opened in 2010. This line will transport coal from the Kodarma–Hazaribagh coal belt for Barh Super Thermal Power Station via Harnaut station.

== Structure ==
=== Facilities ===
The major facilities available are waiting rooms, retiring rooms, computerised reservation facilities, reservation counters, and vehicle parking. The vehicles are not allowed to enter the station premises. There are both vegetarian and non-vegetarian food options, a tea stall, a book stall, a post and telegraphic office and Government Railway police (G.R.P.) office. Automatic ticket vending machines have been installed to reduce the wait for train tickets on the station.

=== Platform ===
Station platform Layout

West	Platform #1
	Train lines（Line 1） Train lines（Line 2）
	Platform #2; Platform #3
	Train lines (Line 3); Train lines (Line 4)
East	Platform #4
	CRW, Harnaut

There are four platforms in the Harnaut railway station. The platforms are interconnected with two footbridges. It has two foot overbridges, the 2nd overbridge is under construction. The 4th platform is under construction.

== Trains ==
Harnaut railway station is a major station of the East Central Railways. Several local passenger trains also run from Harnaut to neighbouring destinations on frequent intervals. The following table lists all the trains passing from Harnaut station: (As of April 2010)

Passing trains
Train no.	Train type	From	To	Name
53229	Passenger	Rajgir	Danapur	Rajgir–Danapur Passenger
12391	Superfast	Rajgir	New Delhi	Shramjeevi Superfast Express
73253	DEMU	Rajgir	Bakhtiyarpur	Rajgir–Bakhtiyarpur DEMU
73258	DEMU	Gaya	Bakhtiyarpur	Gaya–Bakhtiyarpur DEMU
53232	Passenger	Danapur	Tilaiya	Danapur–Tilaiya Passenger
53044	Express	Rajgir	Howrah	Howrah–Rajgir Fast Passenger
13233	Express	Rajgir	Danapur	Rajgriha Express
03207	DEMU	Harnaut	Bakhtiyarpur	*Harnaut–Bakhtiyarpur DEMU
73255	Passenger	Rajgir	Bakhtiyarpur	Rajgir–Bakhtiyarpur Passenger
23040	Express	Rajgir	Howrah	Rajgir–Howrah Composite Express
73254	DEMU	Bakhtiyarpur	Rajgir	Bakhtiyarpur–Rajgir DEMU
15109	Superfast	Rajgir	Varanasi	Budhpurnima Express
13039	Express	Howrah	Rajgir	Howrah–Delhi Janata Express

== Development ==
The Indian Railways had planned to set up a Railway Station Development Corporation (RSDC) that will work on improving the major railway stations as Harnaut railway station by building and developing restaurants, shopping areas and food plazas for commercial business and improving passenger amenities. The railway planned to make station as A grade category. The railway budgeted a new railway track between Harnaut and Barh for coal transportation in Barh Super Thermal Power Station and electrification Bakhtiyarpur–Tilaiya line is under construction. The 4th platform is also under construction. After determining the railway stations that need to be good-class station by constructing well. A phased revamping has begun. Deputy chief traffic manager announced that the pending work at the railway tracks and platforms, presently under construction, will be sped up. To assist passengers, especially the elderly, two foot overbridges may be constructed.

== Gallery ==
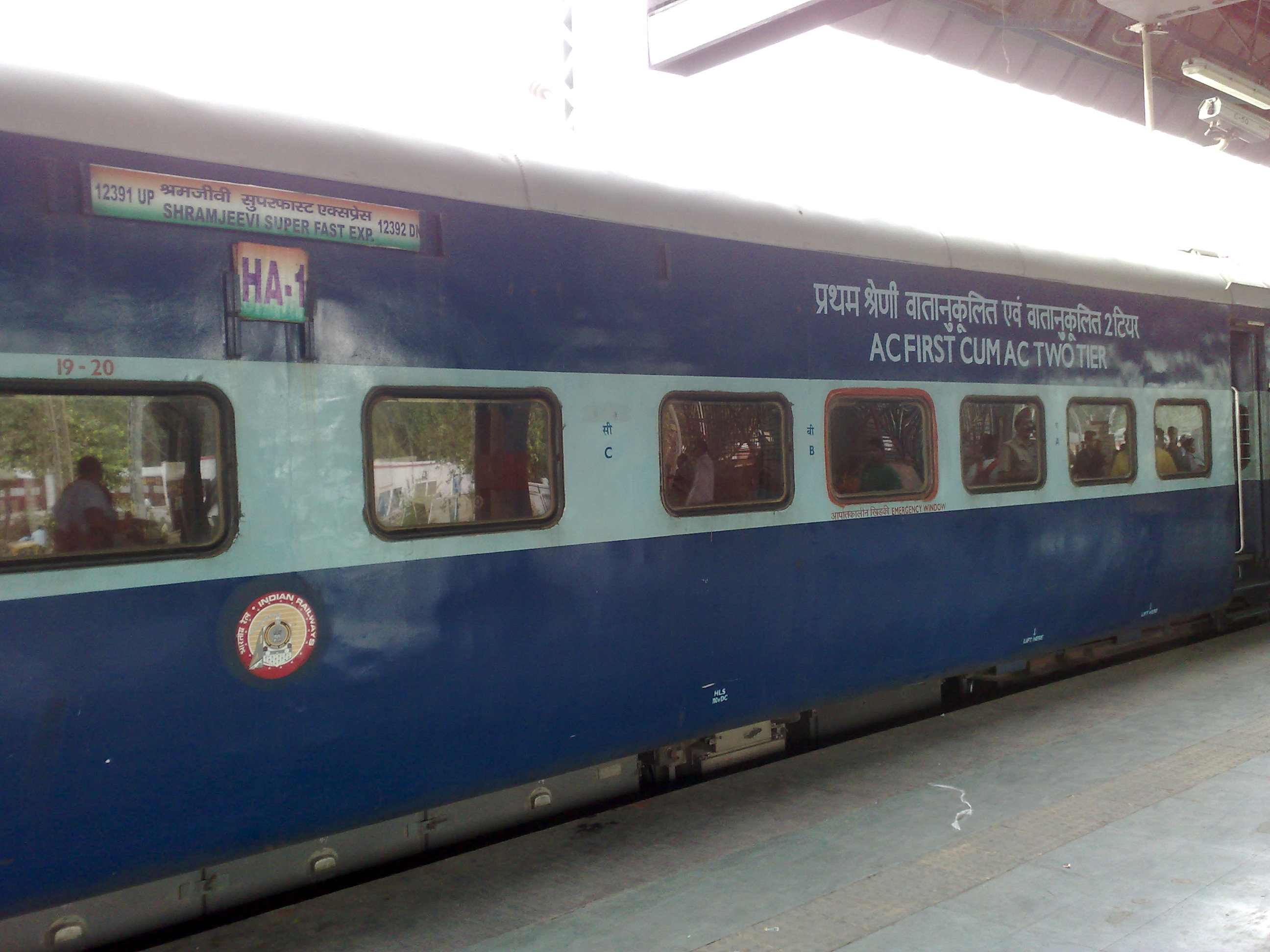
Shramjeevi Express on 1st platform.

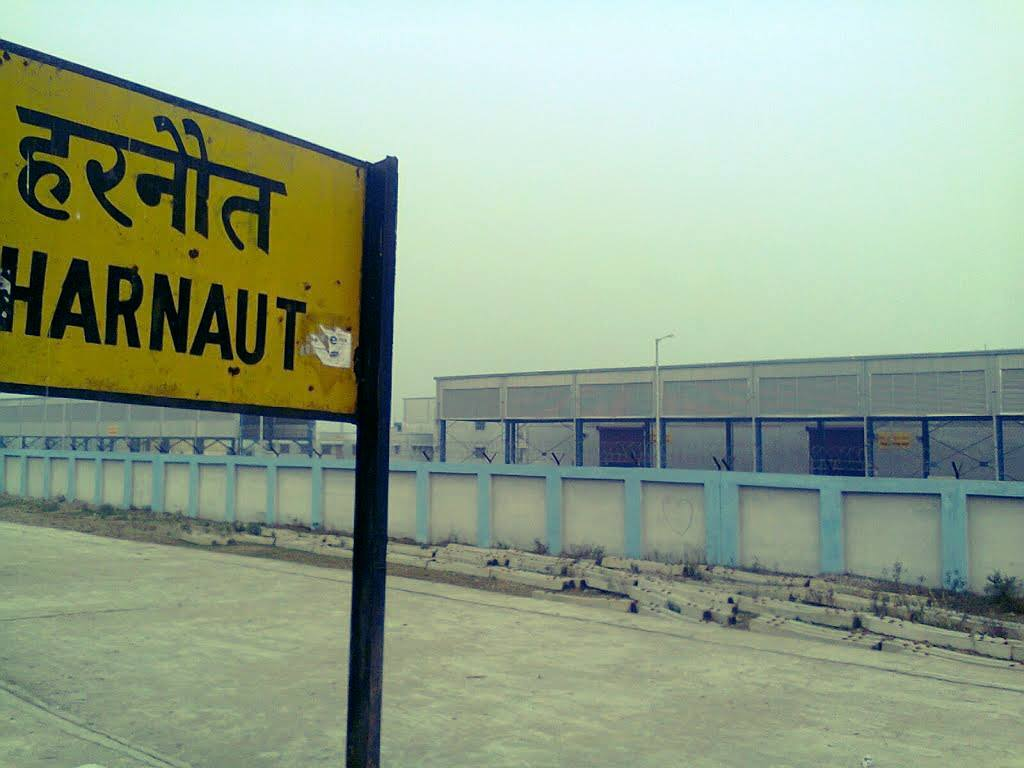
Station platform board

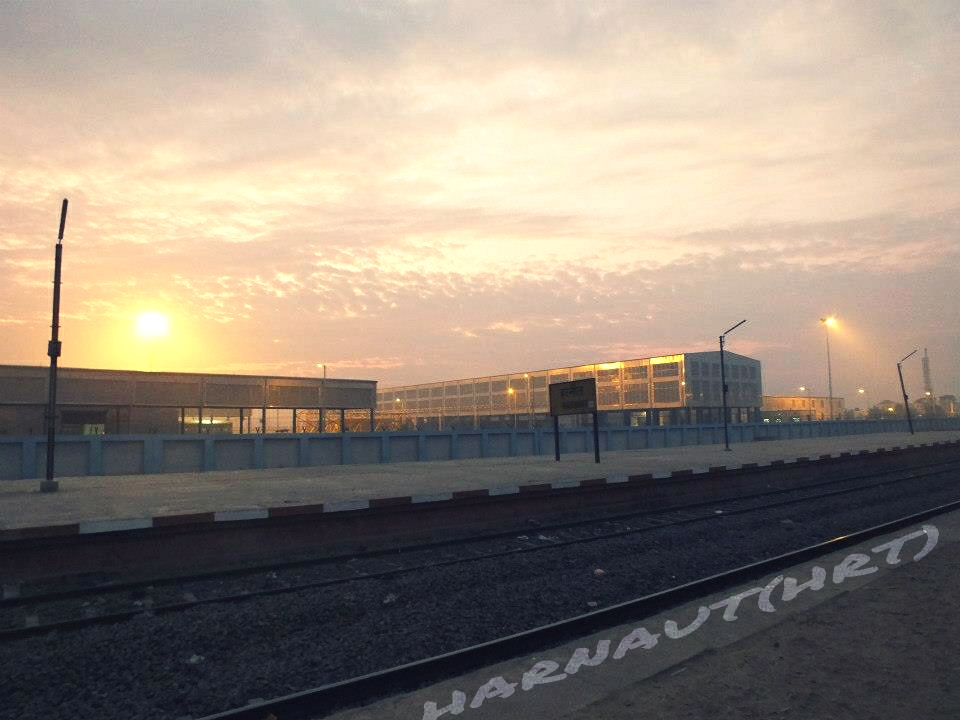
Morning view

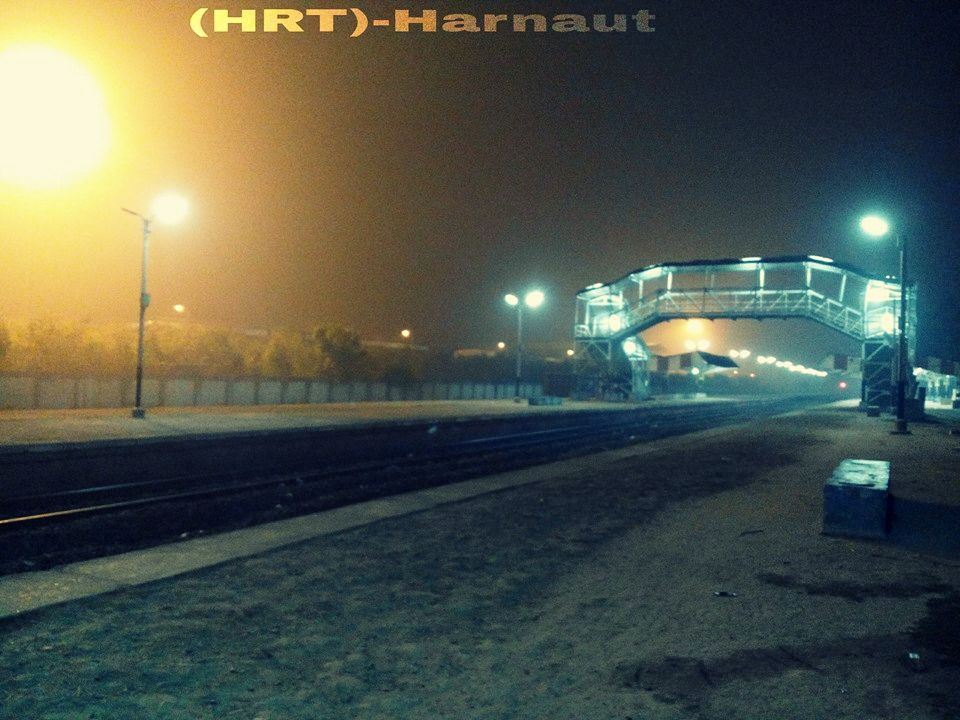
Night view

== Nearest airports ==
The nearest airports to Harnaut station are:

1. Lok Nayak Jayaprakash Airport, Patna 61.9 kilometres (38.5 mi)
2. Gaya Airport 116 kilometres (72 mi)

== See also ==
- Harnaut city
- Carriage Repair Workshop, Harnaut
- Trains passing through Harnaut
- Railway stations in Nalanda district
