= Dekpura Halt railway station =

Railway station in Bihar, India

DEKPURA HALT
- Indian Railways logo

General information
- Location: National Highway 20, Sikandarpur, Dekpura, Nalanda district, Bihar; India
- Coordinates: 25°15′40″N 85°31′46″E
- Elevation: 52 m (171 ft)
- System: Passenger train station
- Owner: Indian Railways
- Operator: East Central Railway zone
- Line: Bakhtiyarpur–Tilaiya line
- Platforms: 2
- Tracks: 2

Construction
- Structure type: Standard (on ground station)

Other information
- Status: Active
- Station code: DKR
- Zone(s): East Central Railway zone
- Division(s): Danapur

Services
Preceding station	Indian Railways	Following station
Ambapendarpur Halt towards Bakhtiyarpur Junction	East Central Railway zone Bakhtiyarpur–Tilaiya line	Sohsarai towards Tilaiya
Location

Dekpura Halt railway station is a halt railway station on the Bakhtiyarpur–Tilaiya line under the Danapur railway division of East Central Railway zone. It is situated beside National Highway 20 at Sikandarpur, Dekpura in Nalanda district in the Indian state of Bihar.
