= Murhari Halt railway station =

Railway station in Bihar

MURHARI HALT
- Indian Railways logo

General information
- Location: National Highway 31, Araut, Nalanda district, Bihar; India
- Coordinates: 25°20′29″N 85°31′59″E
- Elevation: 47 m (154 ft)
- System: Passenger train station
- Owner: Indian Railways
- Operator: East Central Railway zone
- Line: Bakhtiyarpur–Tilaiya line
- Platforms: 1
- Tracks: 1

Construction
- Structure type: Standard (on ground station)

Other information
- Status: Active
- Station code: MUHI
- Zone(s): East Central Railway zone
- Division(s): Danapur

History
- Former names: Bakhtiyarpur–Bihar Sharif light railway

Services
Preceding station	Indian Railways	Following station
Harnaut towards ?	East Central Railway zone Bakhtiyarpur–Tilaiya line	Wena towards ?
Location

Murhari Halt railway station is a halt railway station on the Bakhtiyarpur–Tilaiya line under the Danapur railway division of East Central Railway zone. It is situated beside National Highway 31 at Araut in Nalanda district in the Indian state of Bihar.
