= Harnaut–Mokama section =

Railway line in Bihar, India

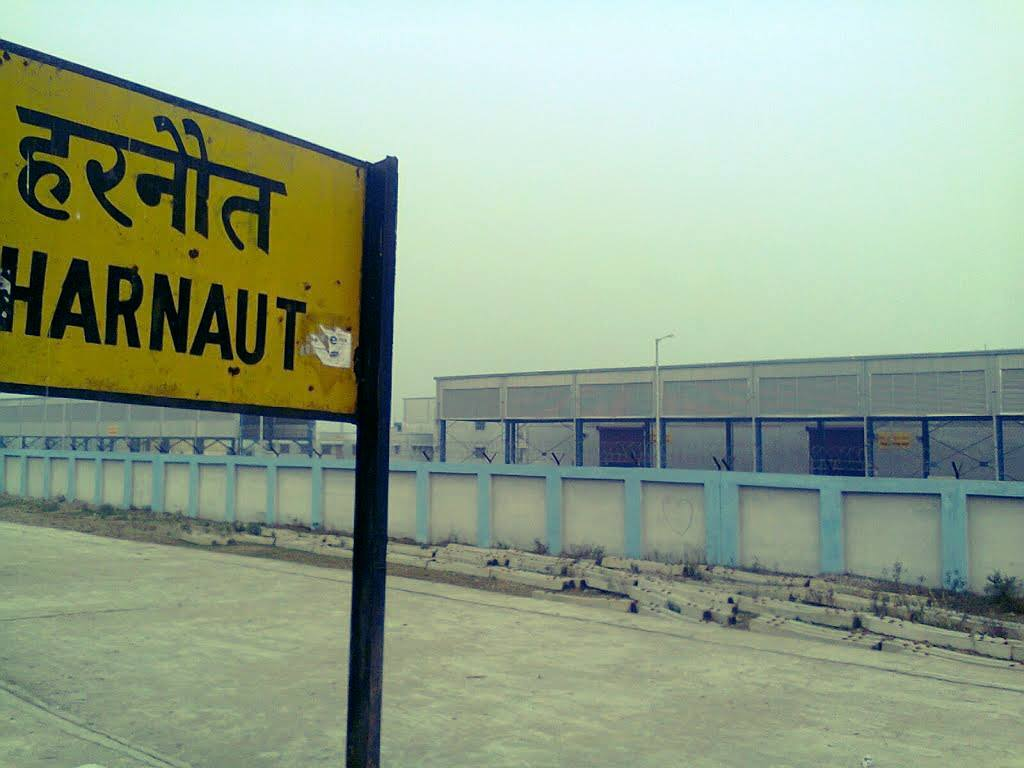
- Harnaut railway station board

Overview
- Status: Operational
- Owner: Indian Railways
- Locale: Bihar
- Termini: Harnaut; Mokama

Service
- Operator: East Central Railway

History
- Opened: 2016

Technical
- Line length: 52 km (32 mi)
- Num of tracks: 1 / 2
- Track gauge: 1,676 mm (5 ft 6 in)
- Operating speed: 80–110 km/h (50–68 mph)

The Harnaut–Mokama section (also known as the Coal Belt Loop) is a railway line in Bihar, India, connecting Harnaut and Mokama Junction. Originally part of the Howrah–Delhi main line and Bakhtiyarpur–Tilaiya line, the section opened to traffic in 2016.

The line transports coal from Jharkhand to the NTPC Barh power plant. Following the construction of a shorter alignment along part of the route, the 53 km (33 mi) stretch was designated as a separate section.

== Branch line ==
A double electrified line connects Harnaut to Barh via Karnauti Halt and Jaiprakash Mahuli Halt.

== Railway workshop and industry ==
Two major industrial facilities are located along this line:

- Carriage Repair Workshop, Harnaut
- NTPC Barh
