= Imlibigha Halt railway station =

Railway station in Bihar

IMLIBIGHA HALT
- Indian Railways logo

General information
- Location: State Highway 78, Imlibigha, Nalanda district, Bihar; India
- Coordinates: 25°18′03″N 85°31′53″E
- Elevation: 49 m (161 ft)
- System: Passenger train station
- Owner: Indian Railways
- Operator: East Central Railway zone
- Line: Bakhtiyarpur–Tilaiya line
- Platforms: 1
- Tracks: 1

Construction
- Structure type: Standard (on ground station)

Other information
- Status: Active
- Station code: IMBG
- Zone(s): East Central Railway zone
- Division(s): Danapur

History
- Former names: Bakhtiyarpur–Bihar Sharif light railway

Services
Preceding station	Indian Railways	Following station
Wena towards ?	East Central Railway zone Bakhtiyarpur–Tilaiya line	Rahui Road towards ?
Location

Imlibigha Halt railway station is a halt railway station on the Bakhtiyarpur–Tilaiya line under the Danapur railway division of East Central Railway zone. It is situated beside State Highway 78 at Imlibigha in Nalanda district in the Indian state of Bihar.
