= Harnaut =

Town in Nalanda, Bihar, India

- Town
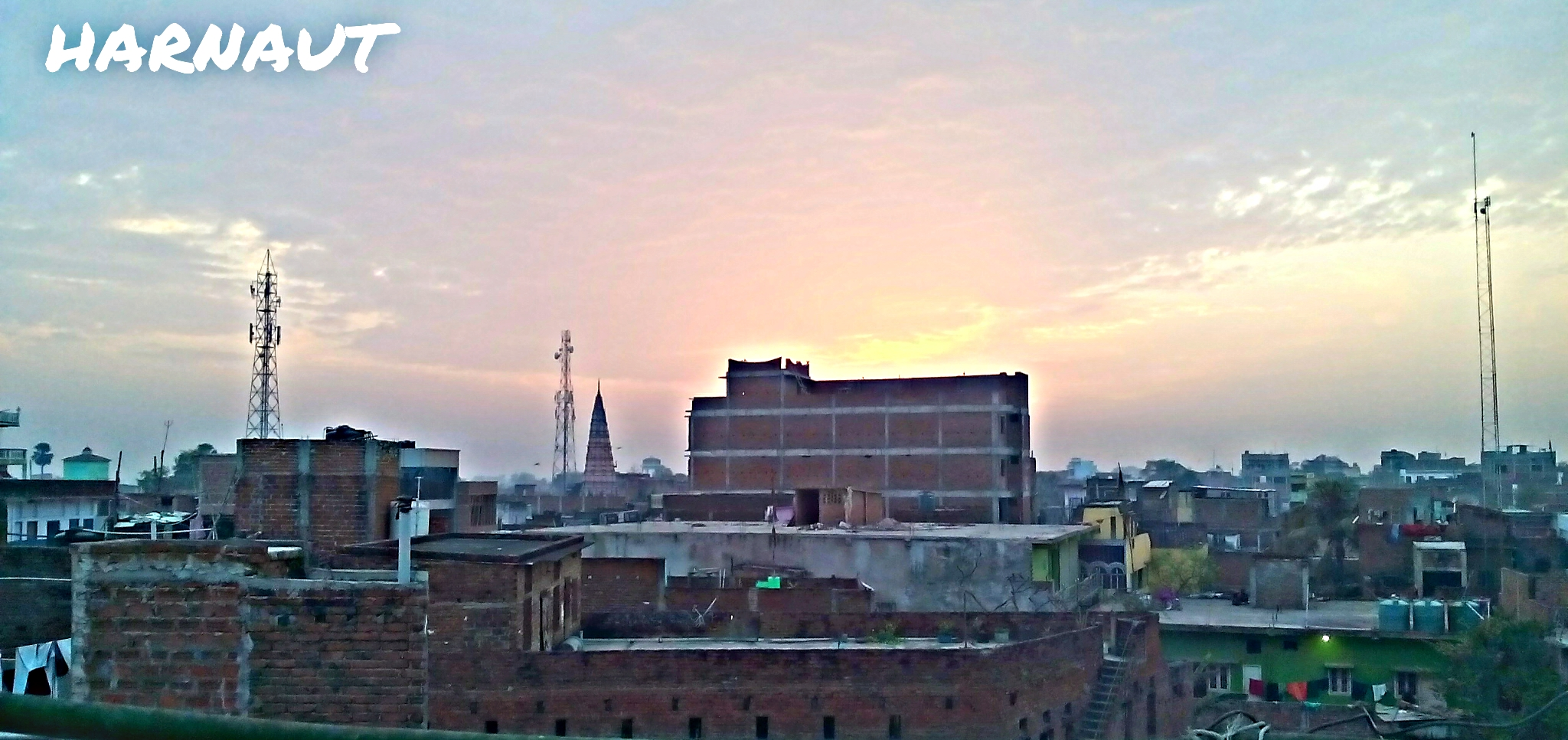
- Shades of City

- Location of Harnaut in Bihar Harnaut (India)
- Coordinates: 25°22′10″N 85°31′55″E
- Country: India
- State: Bihar
- Region: Magadh
- District: Nalanda
- Division: Patna

Government
  - Type: Nagar panchayat
  - Body: Nagar Panchayat Harnaut
  - Member of Parliament: Kaushalendra Kumar
  - District Magistrate: Kundan Kumar, IAS
  - Superintendent of Police, Nalanda: Bharat Soni, IPS
  - MLA: Hari Narayan Singh
  - Chief Councillor: Babita Devi

Area
  - Total: 181.60 km^{2} (70.12 sq mi)
- Elevation: 49 m (161 ft)

Population
  - Total: 176,140
  - Density: 969.93/km^{2} (2,512.1/sq mi)

Languages
  - Official: Hindi, English
  - Regional: Magahi
- Time zone: UTC+5:30 (IST)
- PIN: 803110
- Telephone code: +91-6112
- Vehicle registration: BR-21-XXXX
- Sex ratio: 1.08 (1000/914) ♂/♀
- Literacy: 78.32%
- Avg. summer temperature: 38 °C (100 °F)
- Avg. winter temperature: 10–15 °C (50–59 °F)
- Nearest city: Bihar Sharif, Rajgir, Patna
- Lok Sabha constituency: Nalanda
- Website: harnautnagarpanchayat.com

Harnaut is a Nagar panchayat and corresponding Block in the Nalanda District of Bihar, India. The Hindu, Buddhist and Jain pilgrim centres of Nalanda, Pawapuri, Rajgir, Bodh Gaya and Vaishali are all near Harnaut. The incumbent Ex-Chief Minister of Bihar, Nitish Kumar, is from Kalyan Bigha village near Harnaut.

== Geography ==
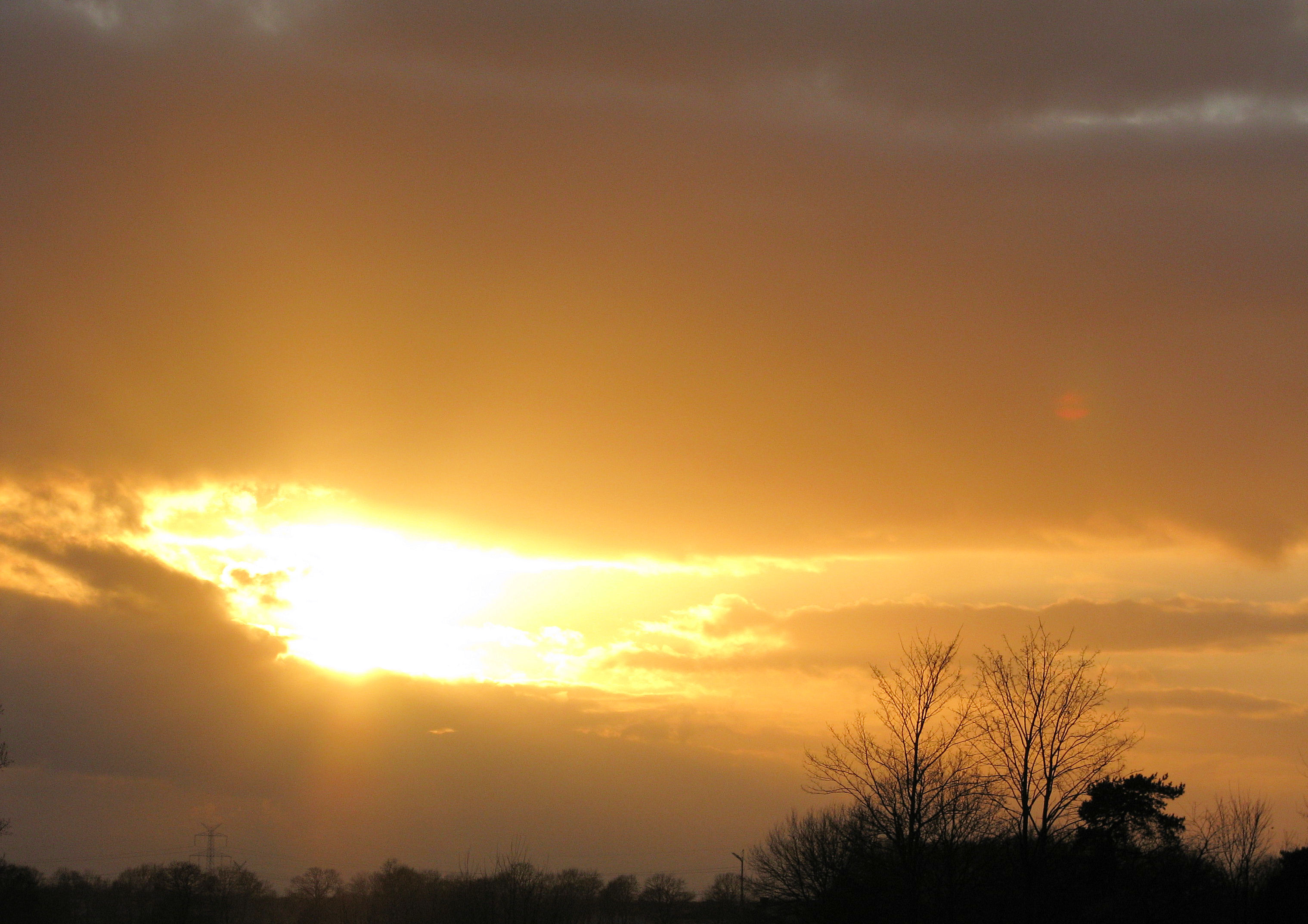
Harnaut evening in spring

Harnaut is at an elevation of 49 m (161 ft) above mean sea level (MSL). Harnaut is one of the most prominent block of Nalanda District. It is the gateway city of Nalanda, 55 km from Patna, the capital of Bihar state, and 23 km from the Ruins of Nalanda. It is on the bank of the River Panchane. The land of Harnaut is very fertile. Alluvial soil is deposited by several rivers of the area. There are many local rivers such as the Dhoba, Muhane,Kararua and Panchane. The Ganges River passes nearby at a distance of 10 km.

== Climate ==
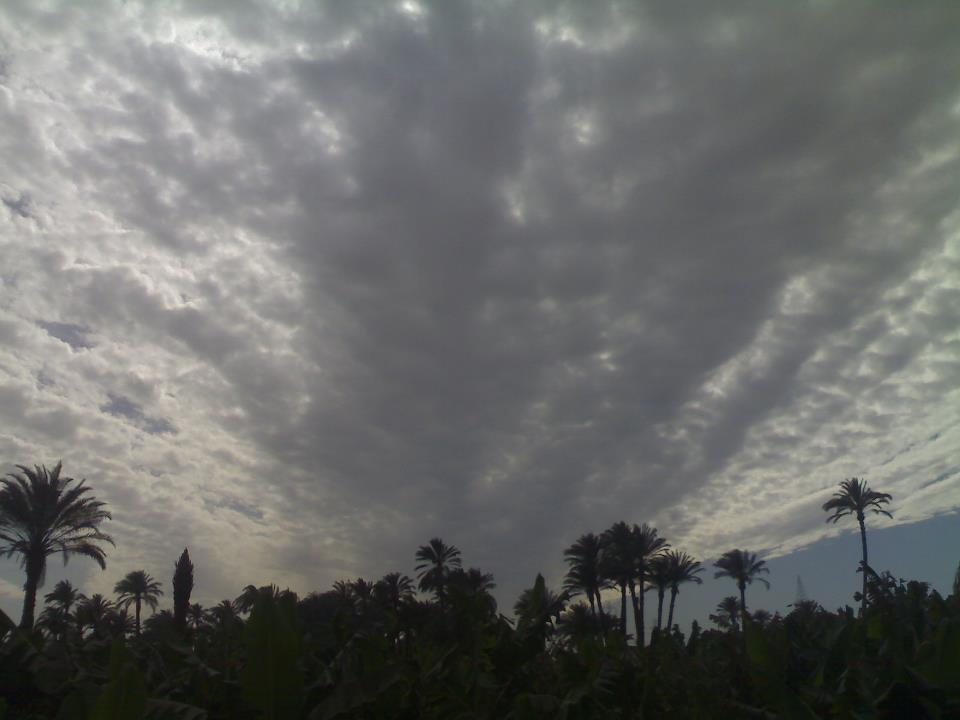
Weather in rainy season

Harnaut has a humid subtropical climate, with hot summers between early March and June.

Harnaut

Climate chart (precipitation, max. and min. temperature)
J	F	M	A	M	J	J	A	S	O	N	D
20 23 9	12 26 12	11 33 17	9.6 37 22	37 38 25	150 37 27	314 33 26	273 33 26	205 32 25	71 32 22	7.5 29 15	6.7 25 10
- █ Average max. and min. temperatures in °C
- █ Precipitation totals in mm
- Source: worldweather wetterkontor.de
Imperial conversion
J	F	M	A	M	J	J	A	S	O	N	D
0.8 73 48	0.5 79 54	0.4 91 63	0.4 99 72	1.5 100 77	5.9 99 81	12 91 79	11 91 79	8.1 90 77	2.8 90 72	0.3 84 59	0.3 77 50
- █ Average max. and min. temperatures in °F
- █ Precipitation totals in inches

The table below details historical monthly averages for climate variables.

Climate data for Harnaut, Bihar, India
Month	Jan	Feb	Mar	Apr	May	Jun	Jul	Aug	Sep	Oct	Nov	Dec	Year
Record high °C (°F)	26.0 (78.8)	30.1 (86.2)	34.4 (93.9)	38.6 (101.5)	40.6 (105.1)	46.6 (115.9)	38.2 (100.8)	36.7 (98.1)	33.5 (92.3)	30.2 (86.4)	28.1 (82.6)	25.5 (77.9)	46.6 (115.9)
Mean daily maximum °C (°F)	22 (72)	26.1 (79.0)	32.4 (90.3)	37.4 (99.3)	38.4 (101.1)	36.7 (98.1)	32.9 (91.2)	29.5 (85.1)	28.2 (82.8)	26.7 (80.1)	25.9 (78.6)	23.6 (74.5)	30.0 (86.0)
Daily mean °C (°F)	15.2 (59.4)	18.9 (66.0)	24.4 (75.9)	29.8 (85.6)	31.8 (89.2)	31.7 (89.1)	29.5 (85.1)	29.3 (84.7)	28.8 (83.8)	26.7 (80.1)	21.9 (71.4)	19.7 (67.5)	25.3 (77.5)
Mean daily minimum °C (°F)	9.3 (48.7)	10.6 (51.1)	15.4 (59.7)	21.1 (70.0)	22.1 (71.8)	25.7 (78.3)	26.1 (79.0)	21.1 (70.0)	20.3 (68.5)	18.6 (65.5)	14.8 (58.6)	10.1 (50.2)	17.9 (64.3)
Record low °C (°F)	2.1 (35.8)	3.4 (38.1)	8.2 (46.8)	13.3 (55.9)	15.7 (60.3)	18.3 (64.9)	20.1 (68.2)	19.5 (67.1)	17.0 (62.6)	12.0 (53.6)	7.7 (45.9)	2.2 (36.0)	2.1 (35.8)
Average precipitation mm (inches)	15.2 (0.60)	11.1 (0.44)	11.4 (0.45)	9 (0.4)	35.6 (1.40)	133.5 (5.26)	302.4 (11.91)	266.3 (10.48)	194.7 (7.67)	24.6 (0.97)	8.2 (0.32)	7.4 (0.29)	1,019.4 (40.19)
Average rainfall mm (inches)	12.2 (0.48)	14.1 (0.56)	09.4 (0.37)	10.8 (0.43)	38.1 (1.50)	142.5 (5.61)	381.0 (15.00)	281.6 (11.09)	229.3 (9.03)	78.6 (3.09)	8.7 (0.34)	7.0 (0.28)	1,213.3 (47.77)
Average rainy days	1.3	1.2	0.7	1.0	2.7	6.5	14.9	12.8	10.2	3.3	0.6	0.7	55.9
Source: Weatherbase

== Overview ==
At present this city does have municipality harnaut nagar nigam, but it is under Sabnahua Panchayat. The people of this city are demanding it to be made into a subdivision. In 2016, the Government of Bihar issued a draft order converting Harnaut into a Nagar Panchayat combining nine villages - Sabnahua, Rupuspur, Porai, Cheran, Basti, Srichandpur and Dihri.

The incumbent Ex-chief minister of Bihar, Mr. Nitish Kumar, has been elected many times as MLA from Harnaut legislative assembly seat. His native village Kalyan Bigha is 4 km north-west of Haranut. River Muhane passes 1 km west of the city.

The population of city is around 176140. It is divided into many parts: Beechli Bazar,Chandi road,Gonawan road, Ranchi road, station road and Harnaut-Athmalgola Rd. Administrative offices are in Dakbanglow Road. Dakbanglow Road is linked to High School Harnaut, Middle School Harnaut, many tuition centres, a big playground and guest house. Beechli Bazar (Central Market Rd), Gonawan road and Chandi Rd is the commercial area of Harnaut. This city is linked to several small roads like - Sartha Rd, Dehra Rd, Swedah Rd, Dwarka Bigha Rd, Gokulpur Rd etc. A small bus stand and a green grocery is located just beside the NH-31. There is a Carriage Repair Workshop under East Central Railway near NH-30A for POH of 50 Non-AC coaches per month...harnaut have well in school, best school like st.paul's ernglish school an road and Chandi Rd is the commercial area of Harnaut. This city is linked to several small roads like - Sartha Rd, Dehra Rd, Swedah Rd, Dwarka Bigha Rd, Gokulpur Rd etc. A small bus stand and a green grocery is located just beside the NH-31. There is a Carriage Repair Workshop under East Central Railway near NH-30A for POH of 50 Non-AC coaches per month.harnaut have well in school, best coaching center in harnaut is Apex classes, concept point, kanak coaching center and many more.

== Economy ==
Agriculture is the main source of income, with rice, wheat, pulses, fruits and vegetables being the main crop. There is also one railway coach factory located in Harnaut. Agriculture is the primary activity although tourism in nearby places like Nalanda, Rajgir and Pawapuri boosts economy of this town. This town supplies agricultural products like cauliflower, potato, mustard seed and other vegetables to neighbouring states. Although the economy is mainly based on agricultural products, garments are also manufactured in household industries. For the help of farmers, there is Krishi Vigyan Kendra, Harnaut which provides help to the people of Nalanda district.

== Culture ==
=== Festivals ===
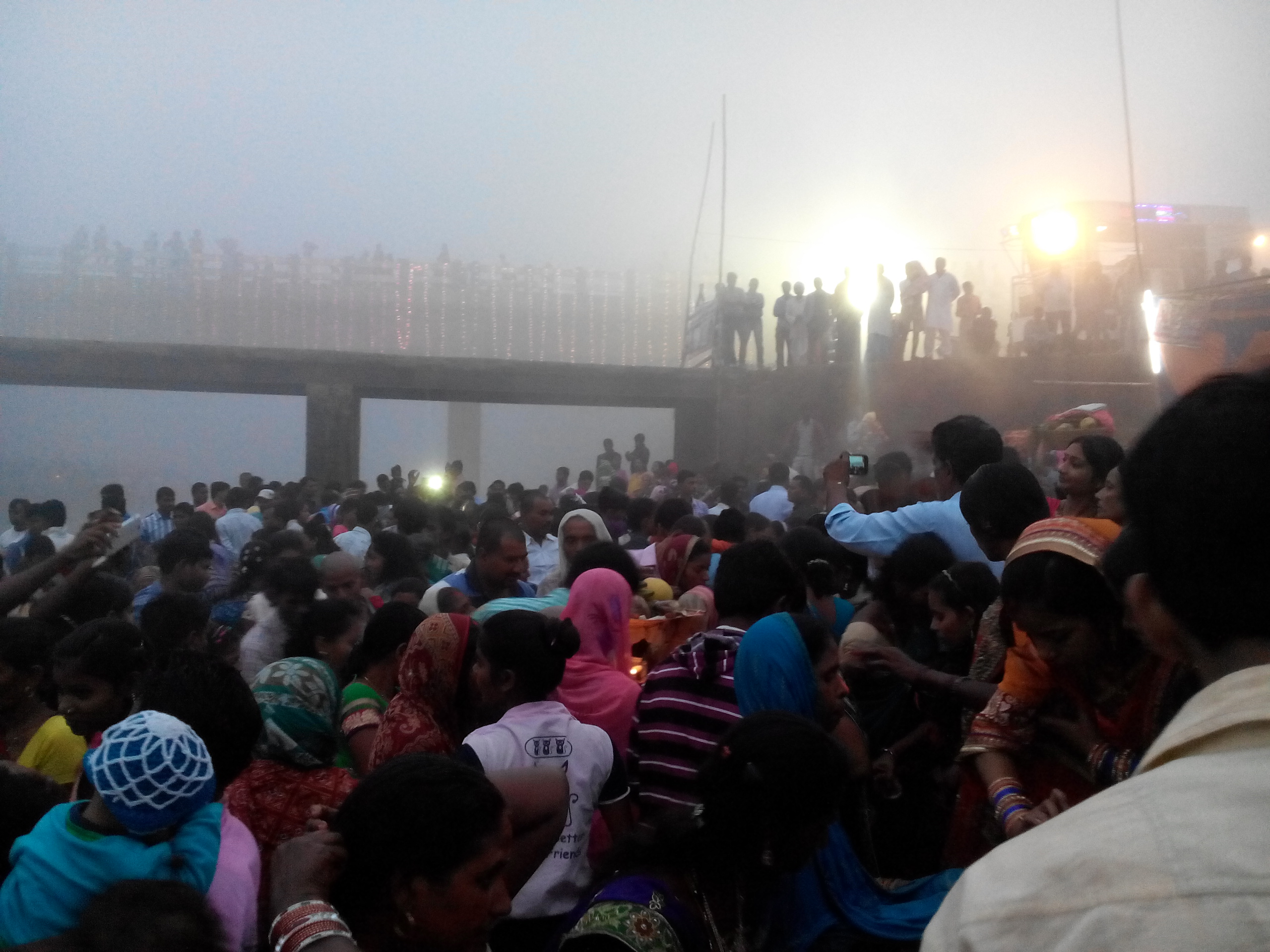
Chhath Puja

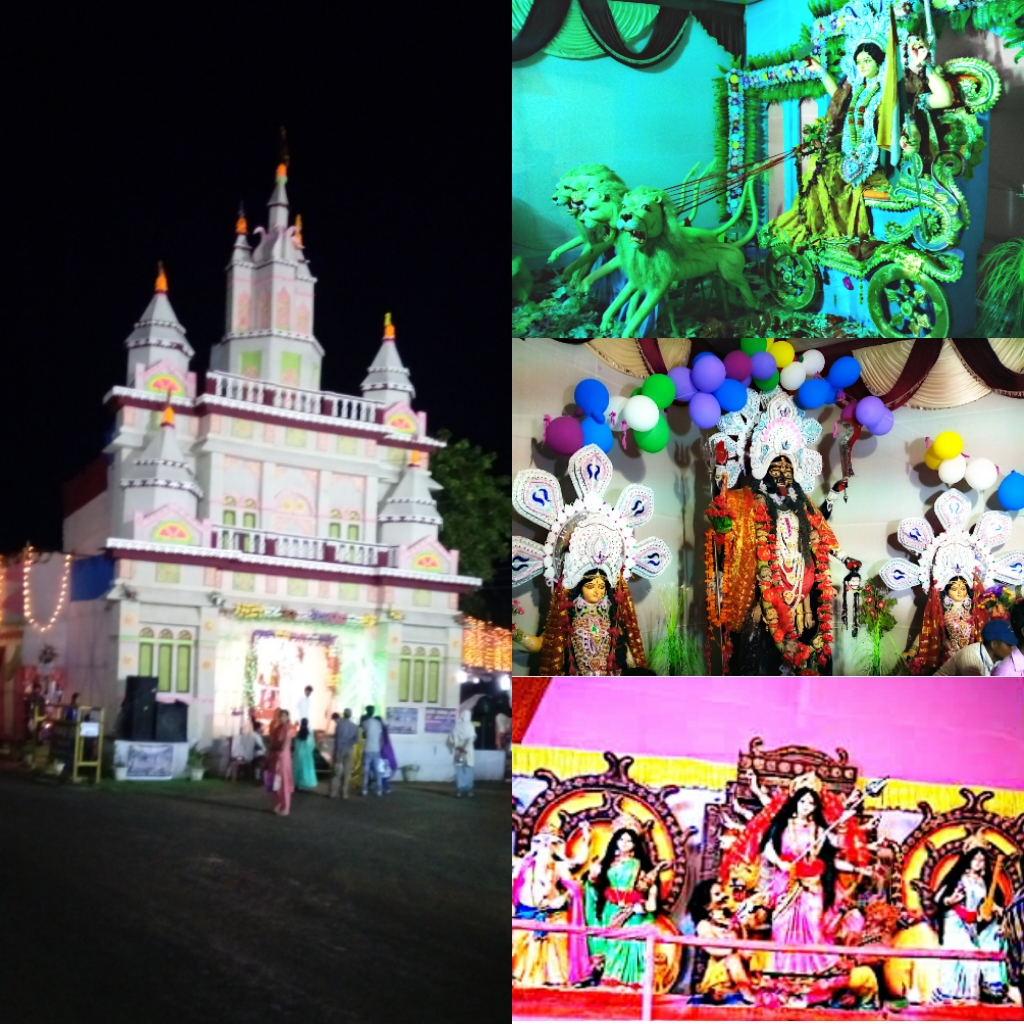
Bharat Mata, Maa Kaali, Maa Durga Navratra Puja 2016 Harnaut

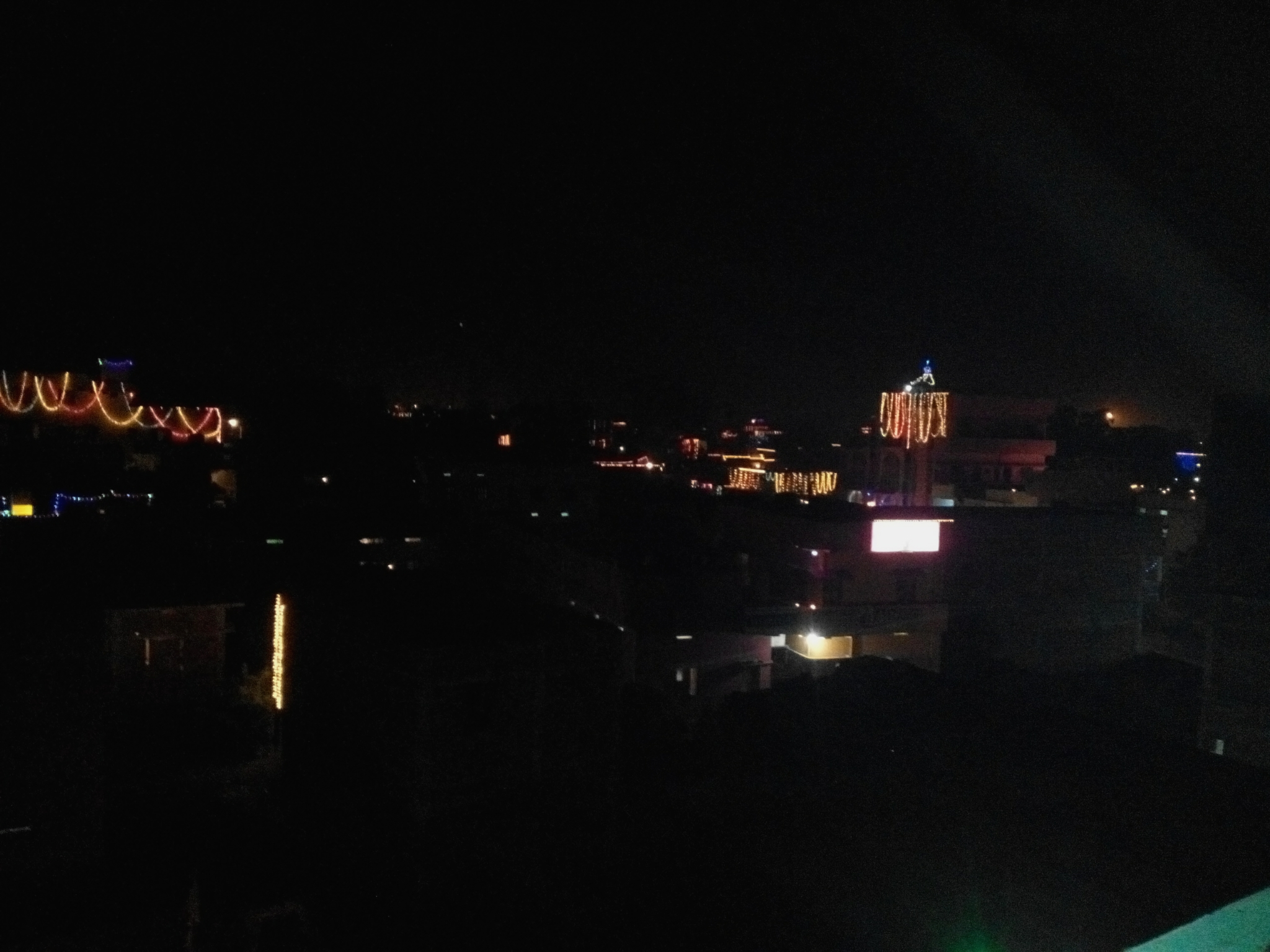
Buildings are decorated with festive lights for Dipawali

- Chhath Puja
- Vijayadashami
- Holi
- Deepawali
- Saraswati Puja

=== Religion ===
Religion
Religion	Percent(%)
Hindu	96.3%
Muslim	1.7%
Christian	1.5%
Other	0.5%

The city's population is predominantly Hindu with minor Muslim and Christian population. Jains, Sikhs and Buddhists are also present because of the most important place for the Buddhism & Jainism near Rajgir, pawapuri. For Islamic religion City Mosque, for Christian Loyola Catholic Church and for Hinduism Ramjanki Temple, Mahaveer Temple and more.

=== Cuisine of Harnaut ===
- Sweets

Sweets are present in most restaurants as the popularity has increased. Many commercial stores have been established as solely desserts stores. Balushahi prepared in Bihar State especially in Harnaut. Ras malai, rasgulla, gulab jamun, and many more.

- Street food

Panipuri "Bhaiya, thoda spicy kam rakhna". Bhelpuri a snack which is a meld of papadis, puffed rice, sev, onions, potatoes, tomatoes, chillies, coriander leaves and chutneys. Kachori with jalebi, Litti (cuisine), samosa, chaat, chole bhature delicious street foods of Harnaut.

- Indo-china/Non-veg cuisine

Kebab, biryani, Indian Omelette, chilli chicken/prawn/fish/mutton/vegetables/paneer. Garlic egg/chicken/prawn/fish/mutton/vegetables/paneer. Manchurian, consisting of chicken or vegetables in a spicy sauce. It is entirely a creation of Chinese restaurants. A little resemblance to traditional Chinese cuisine. Chow mein A popular dish combining noodles, vegetables, scrambled egg, ginger and garlic, soy sauce, green chili sauce, red chili sauce and vinegar.

- Veg cuisine

Paratha, aloo gobi, baingan bharta, naan, palak paneer, Rajma are the special cuisine of city.

== Transport and connectivity ==
- Road network:

Harnaut is well connected by roads to different cities. NH 431 connects it to Varanasi, Patna via Fatuha to Sheikhpura district, Barbigha, Barh, Deoghar etc. Harnaut thus serves as the gateway of the Nalanda district to central and southern Bihar. Similarly, NH 20 connects it to Ranchi via Hazaribagh, Barhi, Nawada, and to northeastern India from Mokama, Purnia, Kishanganj up to Guwahati.

- Rail network:

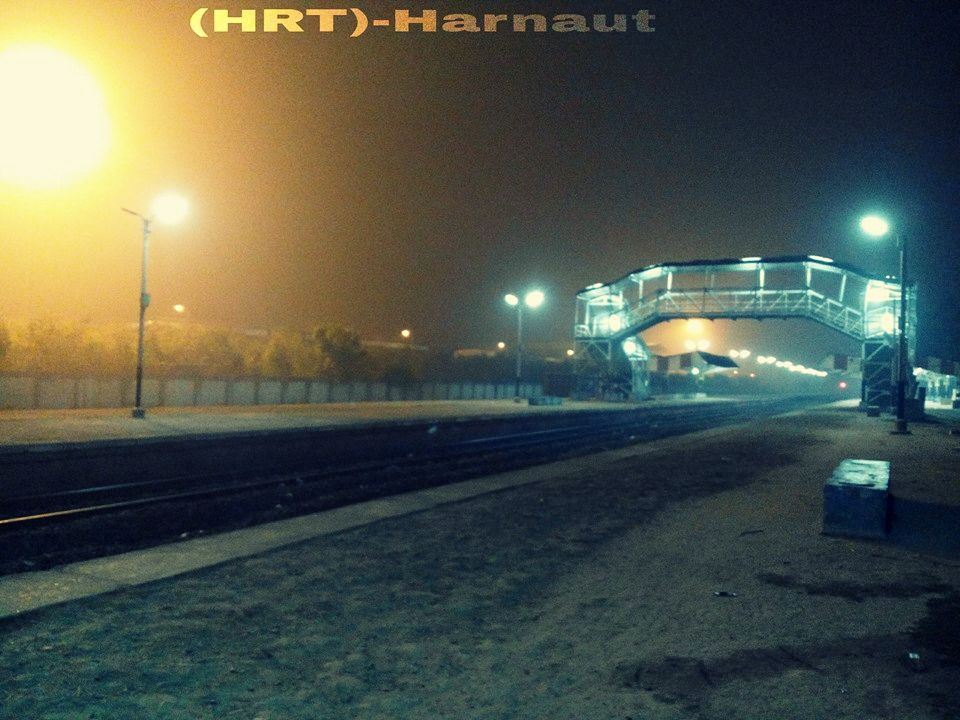
Harnaut railway station

Harnaut railway station is the main railway station of the city, under Danapur Division of the East Central Railway zone. Harnaut is connected with the major cities in India like New Delhi, Mughalsarai, Lucknow, Asansol, Howrah by the Howrah-Delhi Main Line with daily passenger, express and super fast trains services. Harnaut railway station lies on the Bakhtiyarpur-Gaya main line. This is firstly Bakhtiyarpur-Rajgir Line and the line is being further expanded to Natesar to connect with Gaya junction via Tilaiya junction. A daily government bus services for Biharsharif to Barh via Harnaut Bus for patna Nawada sekhpura etc. are available.

== See also ==
- Harnaut railway station
- Carriage Repair Workshop, Harnaut
