= Kharuara Halt railway station =

Railway station in Bihar

KHARUARA HALT
- Indian Railways logo

General information
- Location: Kharaura, Nalanda district, Bihar; India
- Coordinates: 25°24′29″N 85°32′44″E
- Elevation: 48 m (157 ft)
- System: Passenger train station
- Owner: Indian Railways
- Operator: East Central Railway zone
- Line: Bakhtiyarpur–Tilaiya line
- Platforms: 1
- Tracks: 1

Construction
- Structure type: Standard (on ground station)

Other information
- Station code
- Zone(s): East Central Railway zone
- Division(s): Danapur

History
- Former names: Bakhtiyarpur–Bihar Sharif light railway

Services
Preceding station	Indian Railways	Following station
Karnauti Halt towards ?	Eastern Railway zone Bakhtiyarpur–Tilaiya line	Harnaut towards ?
Location

Kharaura Halt railway station is a halt railway station on the Bakhtiyarpur–Tilaiya line under the Danapur railway division of East Central Railway zone. It is situated at Kharaura in Nalanda district in the Indian state of Bihar.
