= Deepnagar Halt railway station =

Railway station in Bihar

Deepnagar Halt

General information
- Location: National Highway 82, Deep Nagar, Nalanda district, Bihar; India
- Coordinates: 25°08′26″N 85°29′00″E
- Elevation: 61 m (200 ft)
- System: Passenger train station
- Owner: Indian Railways
- Operator: East Central Railway zone
- Line: Bakhtiyarpur–Tilaiya line
- Platforms: 1
- Tracks: 1

Construction
- Structure type: Standard (on ground station)

Other information
- Status: Active
- Station code: DPNR
- Zone(s): East Central Railway zone
- Division(s): Danapur

History
- Former names: Bakhtiyarpur–Bihar Sharif light railway

Services
Preceding station	Indian Railways	Following station
Pawapuri Road towards ?	East Central Railway zone Bakhtiyarpur–Tilaiya line	Nalanda towards ?
Location

Deepnagar Halt railway station is a halt railway station on the Bakhtiyarpur–Tilaiya line under the Danapur railway division of East Central Railway zone. It is situated beside National Highway 82 at Deep Nagar in Nalanda district in the Indian state of Bihar.
