= Karnauti Halt railway station =

Railway station in Bihar

Karnauti Halt

General information
- Location: Karnauti, Patna district, Bihar; India
- Coordinates: 25°26′22″N 85°32′34″E
- Elevation: 51 m (167 ft)
- System: Passenger train station
- Owner: Indian Railways
- Operator: East Central Railway zone
- Line: Bakhtiyarpur–Tilaiya line
- Platforms: 1
- Tracks: 1

Construction
- Structure type: Standard (on ground station)

Other information
- Status: Active
- Station code: KRNN
- Zone(s): East Central Railway zone
- Division(s): Danapur

History
- Former names: Bakhtiyarpur–Bihar Sharif light railway

Services
Preceding station	Indian Railways	Following station
Bakhtiyarpur Junction towards ?	East Central Railway zone Bakhtiyarpur–Tilaiya line	Kharuara Halt towards ?
Location

Karnauti Halt railway station is a halt railway station on the Bakhtiyarpur–Tilaiya line under the Danapur railway division of East Central Railway zone. It is situated at Karnauti in Patna district in the Indian state of Bihar.
