= Ambapendarpur Halt railway station =

Railway station in Bihar

AMBAPENDARPUR HALT
- Indian Railways logo

General information
- Location: National Highway 31, Moratalao, Nalanda district, Bihar; India
- Coordinates: 25°16′01″N 85°31′47″E
- Elevation: 52 m (171 ft)
- System: Passenger train station
- Owner: Indian Railways
- Operator: East Central Railway zone
- Line: Bakhtiyarpur–Tilaiya line
- Platforms: 1
- Tracks: 1

Construction
- Structure type: Standard (on ground station)

Other information
- Status: Active
- Station code: APP
- Zone(s): East Central Railway zone
- Division(s): Danapur

History
- Former names: Bakhtiyarpur–Bihar Sharif light railway

Services
Preceding station	Indian Railways	Following station
Rahui Road towards ?	East Central Railway zone Bakhtiyarpur–Tilaiya line	Dekpura Halt towards ?
Location

Ambapendarpur Halt railway station is a halt railway station on the Bakhtiyarpur–Tilaiya line under the Danapur railway division of East Central Railway zone. It is situated beside National Highway 31 at Moratalao in Nalanda district in the Indian state of Bihar.
