= Garobigha Halt railway station =

Railway station in Bihar

Garobigha Halt

General information
- Location: Dhanwan, Nawada district, Bihar; India
- Coordinates: 24.826792°N 85.467153°E
- Elevation: 100 metres (330 ft)
- System: Passenger train Station
- Owner: Indian Railways
- Line: Gaya–Kiul line
- Platforms: 1
- Tracks: 2

Construction
- Structure type: Standard (on-ground station)

Other information
- Status: Functioning
- Station code: GBHA
- Zone(s): East Central Railway zone
- Division(s): Danapur

History
- Opened: 1879; 147 years ago
- Electrified: 2018
- Former names: East Indian Railway

Services
Preceding station	Indian Railways	Following station
Tilaiya Junction towards ?	East Central Railway zone Gaya–Kiul line	Chatar Halt towards ?
Location

Garobigha Halt railway station (station code: GBHA), is a halt railway station on Gaya–Kiul line of Delhi–Kolkata Main Line in East Central Railway zone under Danapur railway division of the Indian Railways. The railway station is situated at Dhanwan in Nawada district in the Indian state of Bihar.
