= Bakhtiyarpur =

Town in Patna district, Bihar, India

- City
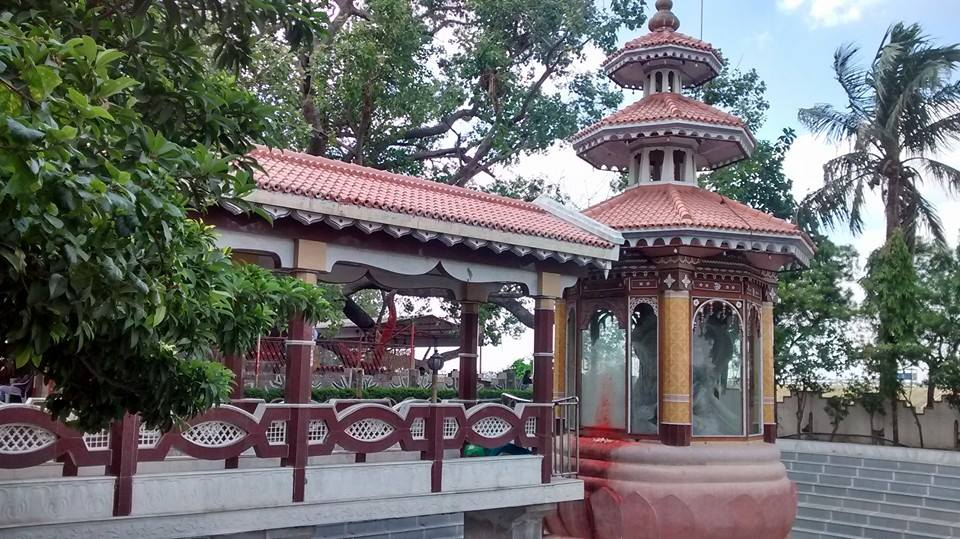
- Maa Jagdamba temple
- Nickname: BKP ( bce patna )
- Location in Bihar, India
- Coordinates: 25.459°N 85.539°E
- Country: India
- State: Bihar
- District: Patna
- Named for: Muhammad Bakhtiyar Khalji

Government
  - Type: Municipal council
  - Current MLA: Arun kumar

Population (2011)
  - Total: 53,223

Languages
  - Official: Hindi, Magadhi
- Time zone: UTC+5:30 (IST)
- PIN: 803212
- ISO 3166 code: IN-BR
- Vehicle registration: BR-01

Bakhtiyarpur is a notified area and town near Patna City in the Patna district in the state of Bihar, India. Bakhtiyarpur is under the Patna Sahib (Lok Sabha constituency), and is a Vidhan Sabha constituency of Bihar in Patna District under the Barh sub-division of Bihar. It is a major railway junction in Danapur railway division, ECR. The former Chief Minister of Bihar, Nitish Kumar belongs to Bakhtiyarpur.

== Demographics ==
As of 2011 India census, Bakhtiarpur had a population of 53,223. Males constitute 52.5% of the population and females 47.5%. Bakhtiarpur has an average literacy rate of 70%, higher than the state average of 61.8%; with 78% of the males and 61.1% of females literate. About 18% of the population is under 6 years of age. Sex ratio is at 903 against the state average of 918. The majority of the residents follow Hinduism (approximately 95%), but there is a scant presence of Sikhs and Jains (0.01%) and approximately 5% of Muslims.

== Naming ==
Bakhtiyarpur originally known as Nalanda is named after Muhammad bin Bakhtiyar Khilji. He was the military general of Qutb ud-Din Aibak, and founded Bakhtiyar city after his conquest of Bengal in 1203, destruction of Nalanda and Vikramshila.

== Transport ==
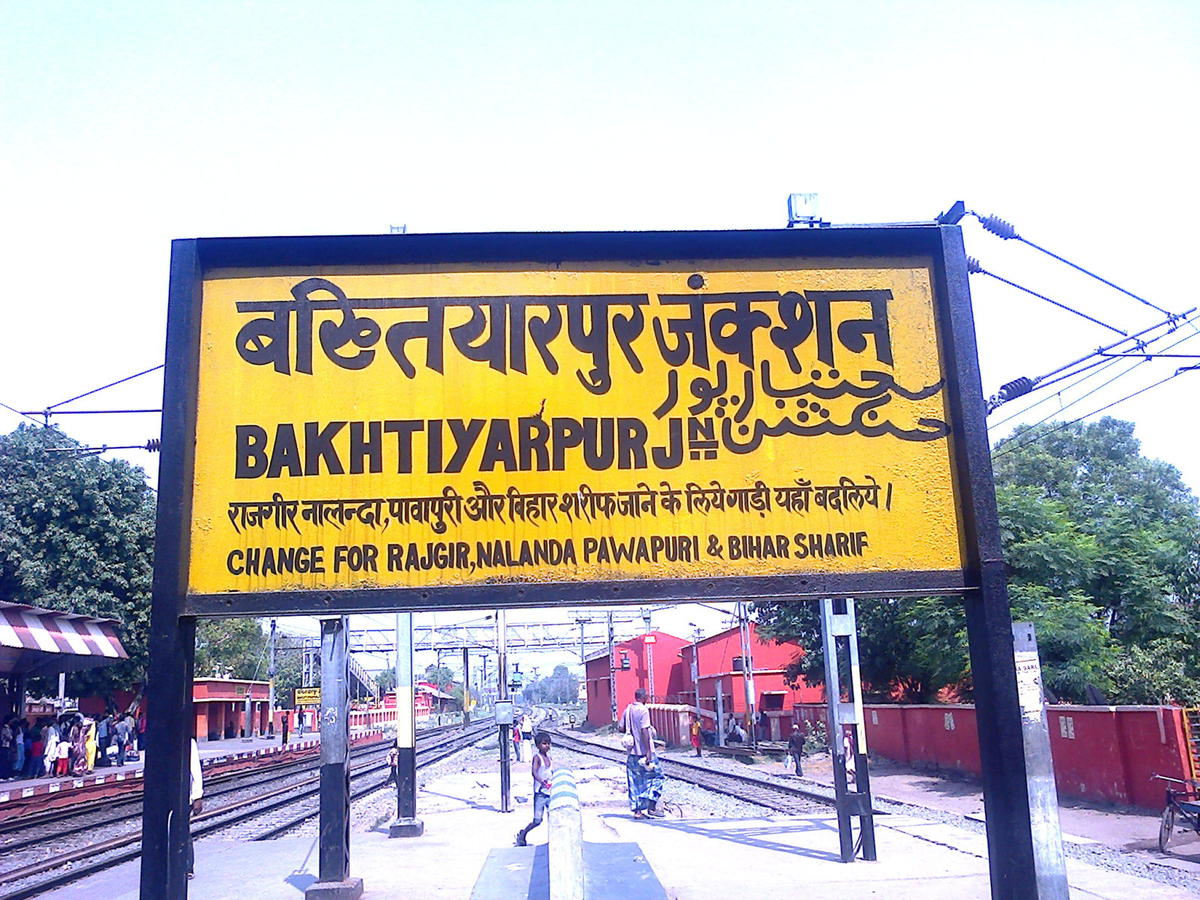
Bakhtiyarpur Junction

Air

Lok Nayak Jayaprakash Airport, Patna is the nearest airport. Gaya Airport is also close to Bakhtiyarpur city with a distance of approximately 120 km.

Rail link

Bakhtiyarpur railway station is located on the Howrah–Delhi main line and is about 46 km away from Patna. Bakhtiyarpur-Tilaiya line also originates here, connecting Rajgir, Bihar Sharif and Harnaut of Nalanda district up to Tilaiya and to be extended to Koderma Junction railway station.

Roads

Bakhtiarpur is connected to Patna by NH 31, a 4-lane Expressway in the west, and NH 20 towards south to connect Bihar Sharif up to Ranchi and Barh in the east. Regular bus service is available for these places. It is also connected to Mokama by a 2-lane NH parallel to the Ganga River. A 4-lane bridge Bakhtiyarpur-Tajpur Bridge is also under construction for connecting Patna district to Samastipur district. A state highway road SH 108 between bakhtiyarpur and fatuha which is old NH 30,

== Notable people ==
- Nitish Kumar
- Sheel Bhadra Yajee
