= Pawapuri Road railway station =

Railway station in Bihar

Pawapuri Road

General information
- Location: Ranchi-Patna Road, Bijwanpar, Nalanda district, Bihar; India
- Coordinates: 25°09′33″N 85°30′42″E
- Elevation: 61 m (200 ft)
- System: Passenger train station
- Owner: Indian Railways
- Operator: East Central Railway
- Line: Bakhtiyarpur–Tilaiya line
- Platforms: 2
- Tracks: 1

Construction
- Structure type: Standard (on ground station)

Other information
- Status: Active
- Station code: POE
- Zone(s): East Central Railway zone
- Division(s): Danapur

History
- Former names: Bakhtiyarpur–Bihar Sharif light railway

Services
Preceding station	Indian Railways	Following station
Tungi Halt towards ?	East Central Railway zone Bakhtiyarpur–Tilaiya line	Deepnagar Halt towards ?
Location

Pawapuri Road railway station is a railway station on the Bakhtiyarpur–Tilaiya line under the Danapur railway division of East Central Railway zone. It is situated beside Ranchi-Patna Road at Bijwanpar in Nalanda district in the Indian state of Bihar.
