= Rahui Road railway station =

Railway station in Bihar, India

Rahui Road

General information
- Location: National Highway 31, Patasang, Nalanda district, Bihar; India
- Coordinates: 25°16′27″N 85°31′51″E
- Elevation: 51 m (167 ft)
- System: Passenger train station
- Owner: Indian Railways
- Operator: East Central Railway zone
- Line: Bakhtiyarpur–Tilaiya line
- Platforms: 1
- Tracks: 1

Construction
- Structure type: Standard (on ground station)

Other information
- Status: Active
- Station code: RRE
- Zone(s): East Central Railway zone
- Division(s): Danapur

History
- Former names: Bakhtiyarpur–Bihar Sharif light railway

Services
Preceding station	Indian Railways	Following station
Imlibigha Halt towards ?	East Central Railway zone Bakhtiyarpur–Tilaiya line	Ambapendarpur Halt towards ?
Location

Rahui Road railway station is a railway station on the Bakhtiyarpur–Tilaiya line under the Danapur railway division of East Central Railway zone. It is situated beside National Highway 31 at Patasang in Nalanda district in the Indian state of Bihar.

== Trains at Rahui Road Railway Station ==
1. Danapur passenger (runs daily)
2. Bakhtiyarpur memu (Monday to Saturday)
3. Gaya Bakhtiyarpur memu (Monday to Saturday)
4. Bakhtiyarpur memu (Monday to Saturday)
5. Tilaiya Danapur passenger (runs daily)
