= Sohsarai Halt railway station =

Railway station in Bihar, India

SOHSARAI Halt
- Indian Railways logo

General information
- Location: Bihar Sharif Eastern Bypass, Imamganj, Sohsarai, Nalanda district, Bihar; India
- Coordinates: 25°13′53″N 85°32′19″E
- Elevation: 54 m (177 ft)
- System: Passenger train station
- Owner: Indian Railways
- Operator: East Central Railway zone
- Line: Bakhtiyarpur–Tilaiya line
- Platforms: 2
- Tracks: 2

Construction
- Structure type: Standard (on ground station)

Other information
- Status: Active
- Station code: SOW
- Zone(s): East Central Railway zone
- Division(s): Danapur

History
- Former names: Bakhtiyarpur–Bihar Sharif light railway

Services
Preceding station	Indian Railways	Following station
Dekpura Halt towards ?	East Central Railway zone Bakhtiyarpur–Tilaiya line	Bihar Sharif Junction towards ?
Location

Sohsarai Halt railway station is a railway station on the Bakhtiyarpur–Tilaiya line under the Danapur railway division of East Central Railway zone. It is situated beside Bihar Sharif Eastern Bypass, Imamganj at Sohsarai in Nalanda district in the Indian state of Bihar.
