= Wena railway station =

Railway station in Bihar

Wena

General information
- Location: National Highway 31, Wena, Nalanda district, Bihar; India
- Coordinates: 25°19′36″N 85°31′55″E
- Elevation: 47 m (154 ft)
- System: Passenger train station
- Owner: Indian Railways
- Operator: East Central Railway zone
- Line: Bakhtiyarpur–Tilaiya line
- Platforms: 3
- Tracks: 1

Construction
- Structure type: Standard (on ground station)

Other information
- Status: Active
- Station code: WENA
- Zone(s): East Central Railway zone
- Division(s): Danapur

Services
Preceding station	Indian Railways	Following station
Murhari Halt towards ?	East Central Railway zone Bakhtiyarpur–Tilaiya line	Imlibigha Halt towards ?
Location

Wena railway station is a railway station on the Bakhtiyarpur–Tilaiya line under the Danapur railway division of East Central Railway zone. It is situated beside National Highway 31 at Wena in Nalanda district in the Indian state of Bihar.
