= Chatar Halt railway station =

Railway station in Bihar

Chatar Halt

General information
- Location: Chatar, Nawada district, Bihar; India
- Coordinates: 24.842144°N 85.495374°E
- Elevation: 97 metres (318 ft)
- System: Passenger train Station
- Owner: Indian Railways
- Line: Gaya–Kiul line
- Platforms: 1
- Tracks: 2

Construction
- Structure type: Standard (on-ground station)

Other information
- Status: Functioning
- Station code: CTHT
- Zone(s): East Central Railway zone
- Division(s): Danapur

History
- Opened: 1879; 147 years ago
- Electrified: 2018
- Former names: East Indian Railway

Services
Preceding station	Indian Railways	Following station
Garobigha Halt towards ?	East Central Railway zone Gaya–Kiul line	Nawada towards ?
Location

Chatar Halt railway station (station code: CTHT), is a halt railway station on Gaya–Kiul line of Delhi–Kolkata Main Line in East Central Railway zone under Danapur railway division of the Indian Railways. The railway station is situated at Chatar in Nawada district in the Indian state of Bihar.
