= Hasanchak =

- Village
- Location in Bihar, India
- Coordinates: 25°23′0″N 85°31′53″E
- Country: Barh India
- State: Bihar
- Division: Patna
- District: Patna

Population
  - Total: 3,030

Languages
  - Official: Magadhi, Hindi
- Time zone: UTC+5:30 (IST)
- ISO 3166 code: IN-BR
- Website: patna.nic.in

Hasanchak (Barh), is a village in Barh, Patna District, Bihar, India. The Ganga River flows close to the village.

== Location ==
Hasanchak is located on the Barhi-Guwahati National Highway no 31. The village is 62 km east of Patna, the capital city of the state and district headquarters. Patna – Mokama four lane pass through the village also one of Minor River JalHar divide village in two part North hasanchak & South hasanchak . The nearest cities are [Barh] (5 km east) [Athmalgola] (8 km west) and [Bakhtiyarpur] (18km west) The nearest railway station is located in Barh, and the nearest airport is jpn Airport.

== Population ==
The population of Hasanchak is 5030 (2400 female and 2630 male). There is a 88% educational qualification in the village.
