= Bihar Dalit Development Organization =

Coordinates: 25°36′30.38″N 85°3′58.63″E

Bihar Dalit Development Organization Bihar Dalit Vikas Samiti
- Abbreviation: BDVS
- Established: 1982; 44 years ago
- Headquarters: Bailey Road, Rukunpura; Barh, Patna, India
- Founder: José Kananaikil
- Director: Anto Joseph
- Affiliations: Jesuit, Catholic
- Website: BDVS
- Formerly called: Harijan Uthan Samiti

Bihar Dalit Development Organization (Bihar Dalit Vikas Samiti) was founded in Bihar, India, by José Kananaikil in 1982 for village level mobilization of Dalit men and women, solidarity building, the educational and economic empowerment of Dalits, and the elimination of caste discrimination.

It has grown into an association of 500 villages encompassing 100,000 families, with 14 affiliated centers and a central office at Barh. Its goal is to establish an educated, justice-seeking Dalit society. Kananaikil received many awards including the national award of the Bhartiya Dalit Sahitya Academy.

== History ==
Jose Kananaikal started to work among the people in Bihar State and founded Harijan Uthan Samiti (Harijan Uplift Association), but he later changed its name to “Bihar Dalit Vikas Samiti” to focus on poor people working for the Upper Shudras.

== See also ==
- List of Jesuit sites
