= Bakhtiyarpur Junction railway station =

Railway station in Patna, Bihar, India

BAKHTIYARPUR JUNCTION बख्तियारपुर जंक्शन بختیار پور جنکشن

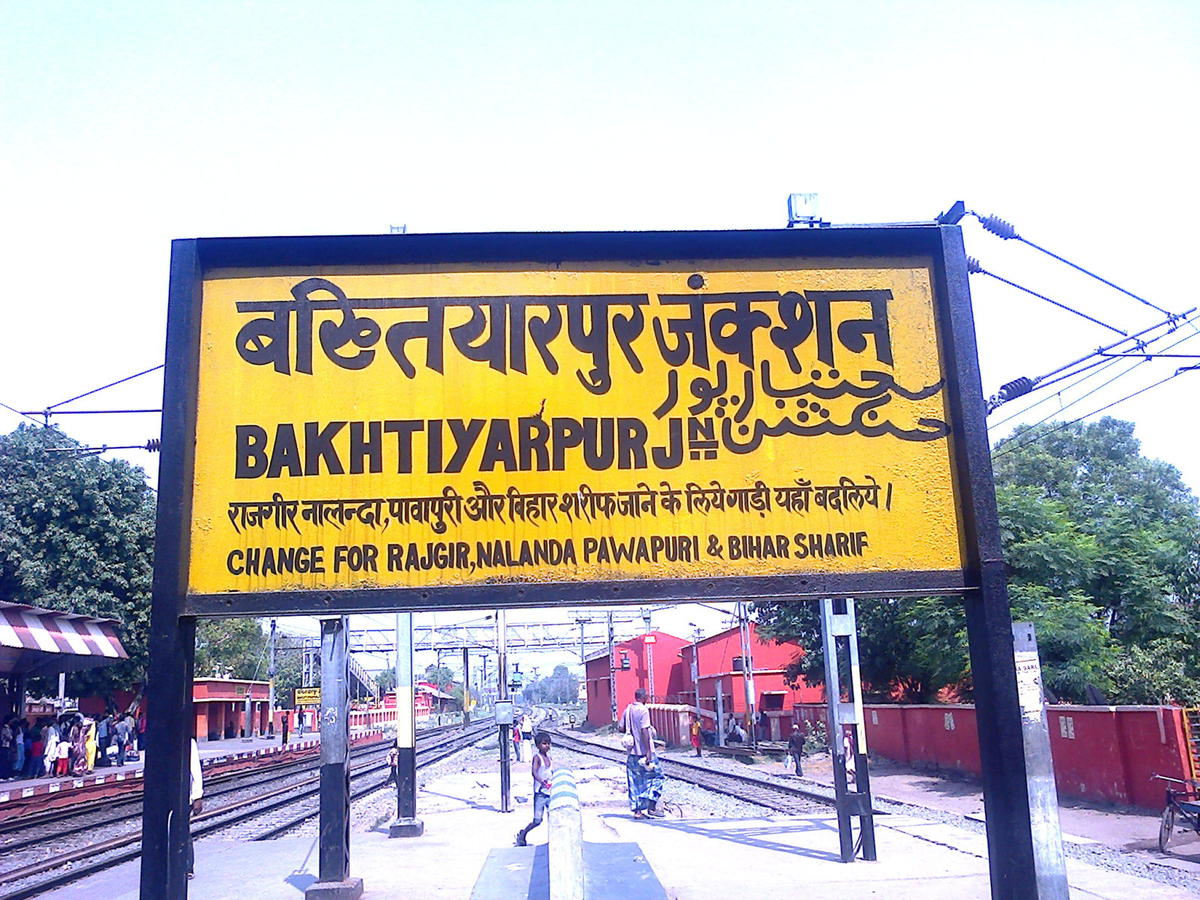
- Bakhtiyarpur station board

General information
- Location: Station Road, Bakhtiarpur, Patna district, Bihar; India
- Coordinates: 25°27′21″N 85°31′51″E
- Elevation: 51 metres (167 ft)
- System: Indian Railways station
- Owner: Indian Railways
- Operator: East Central Railway
- Lines: Howrah–Delhi main line Asansol–Patna section Bakhtiyarpur–Tilaiya line
- Platforms: 5
- Tracks: 6
- Connections: Barh, Harnaut, Khusropur

Construction
- Structure type: Standard (on-ground station)
- Parking: Available

Other information
- Status: Functioning
- Station code: BKP
- Zone(s): East Central Railway
- Division(s): Danapur division
- Fare zone: East Central Railway

Passengers
- 35,000
Services
Preceding station	Indian Railways	Following station
Jai Prakash Mahuli towards Asansol Junction or Howrah Junction	Howrah–Delhi main line Asansol–Patna section	Champapur Halt towards Patna Junction or New Delhi
Terminus	Bakhtiyarpur–Tilaiya line	Karnauti Halt towards Tilaiya
Route map
- Sources
Location
- Location within Bihar Location within India
- Interactive map

Bakhtiyarpur Junction, station code BKP, is a railway station in the Danapur railway division of East Central Railway Zone. Bakhtiyarpur is connected to metropolitan areas of India, by the Delhi–Kolkata main line via Pt. Deen Dayal Upadhyaya Junction-Patna route. Bakhtiyarpur Junction is located in Bakhtiarpur city in Patna district is about 46 km away from Patna in the Indian state of Bihar. Due to its location on the Howrah–Patna–Pt. Deen Dayal Upadhyaya Junction main line many trains from Patna and Barauni bound express trains coming from Howrah, Sealdah stop here.

== Facilities ==
The major facilities available are computerized reservation facility, Vehicle parking. The vehicles are allowed to enter the station premises. The station also has STD/ISD/PCO Telephone booth, toilets, tea stall and book stall. The station has been recently equipped with Railways WiFi facility.

=== Platforms ===
There are 5 platforms in this station. The platforms are interconnected with foot overbridges (FOB). Bakhityarpur junction contains 5 platform in which platform 1 and 2 are main line platform 1 patna to asansol and platform 2 goes patna junction Platform 3 4 5 basically use for rajgir, bihar sahrif, murhari hi - tech city, harnaut.

== Nearest airports ==
The nearest airport to Bakhtiyarpur Junction are:

1. Gaya Airport 110 kilometres (68 mi)
2. Lok Nayak Jayaprakash Airport, Patna 52 kilometres (32 mi)
