= Carriage Repair Workshop, Harnaut =

Indian rail repair facility

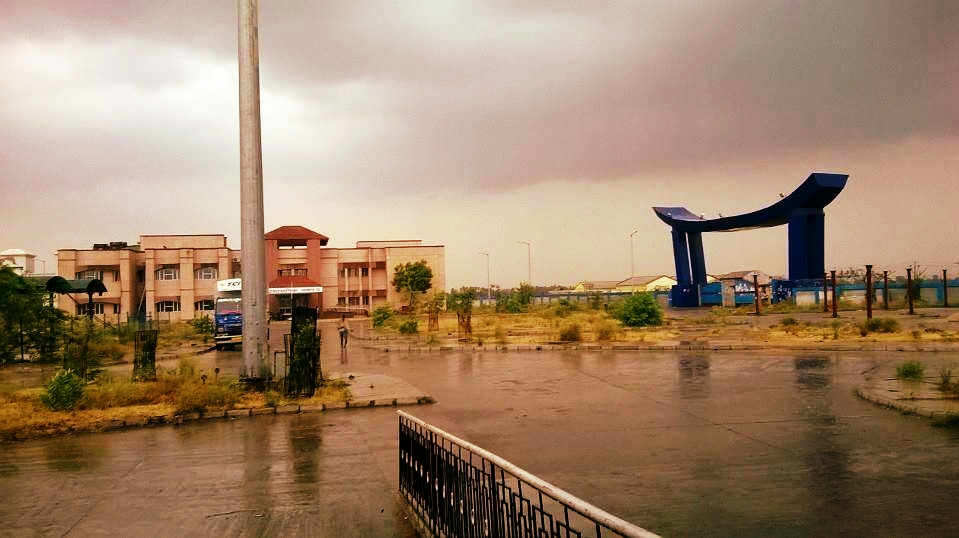
- Main gate of C.R.W Harnaut
- Company type: GS & WGSCN Coach
- Industry: Indian Railways
- Founded: 30 June 2003 laid by Dr.A.P.J Abdul kalam
- Headquarters: Administrative Building, NH 30A, Harnaut, India
- Services: Passenger Coach
- Owner: East Indian Railway
- Number of employees: ≈ 1000
- Divisions: Danapur Division

The Carriage Repair Workshop, Harnaut provides bogie maintenance services for India's East Central Railway. According to Indian Railways's rules, coaches require preventive maintenance every eighteen months. The facility employs 1,000 and handles fifty units each month.

Workshop is located at near Harnaut railway station on Bakhtiyarpur-Tilaiya line at NH 30A. And 55 km from Patna.

== History ==
East Central Railway had no carriage repair workshop and was totally dependent on ER and NER. President APJ Abdul Kalam had laid the foundation stone for the workshop at Harnaut on 30 June 2003, during Nitish Kumar's tenure as railway minister. Most of its infrastructure was completed in 2013 and in the future there is a plan to repair air-conditioned coaches as well.

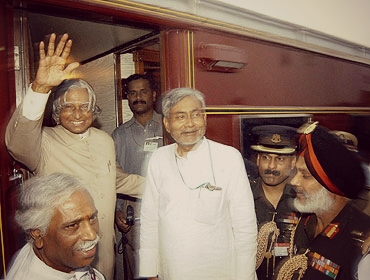
President of India A P J Abdul Kalam and Railway minister [Sri Nitish Kumar] at Harnaut railway station

== Infrastructure ==
The Harnaut workshop is located 115 acres of land, the workshop on 78 acres and staff quarters on 37 acres.

Constructed at an expenditure of Rs. 328 crore, it has all together eighteen repair workshops. It is one of the most advanced coach factories in the country with the 'double stacked coach maintenance technology' to carry out periodical overhauling of coaches. The workshop is headed by the Chief Workshop manager. There are five departments dealing with various activities such as Mechanical, Electrical, Materials Management, Finance & Accounts, HRD, Audit & Security. It has a total employee strength of approx 5,000.

== Main activities ==
The workshop undertakes the periodic overhauling. According to project in-charge Sunil Kumar, the railways has installed machines, including bogie testing apparatus, surface wheel lathe, plasma profile cutting machines and other essential plants required for smooth functioning of the workshop.

== Gallery ==
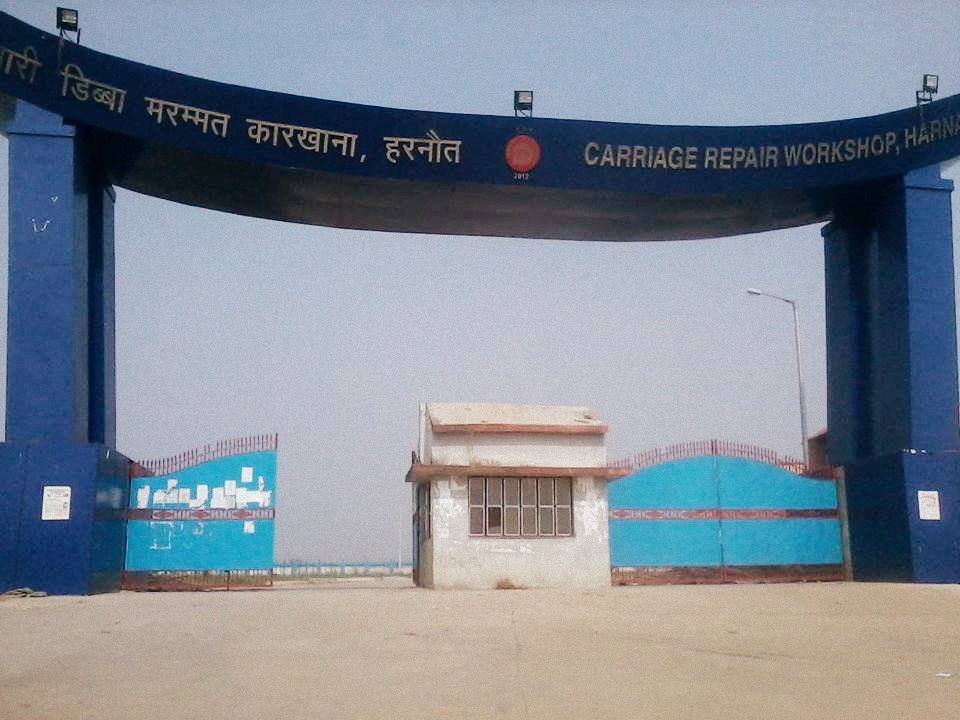
Gate No.1 CRW

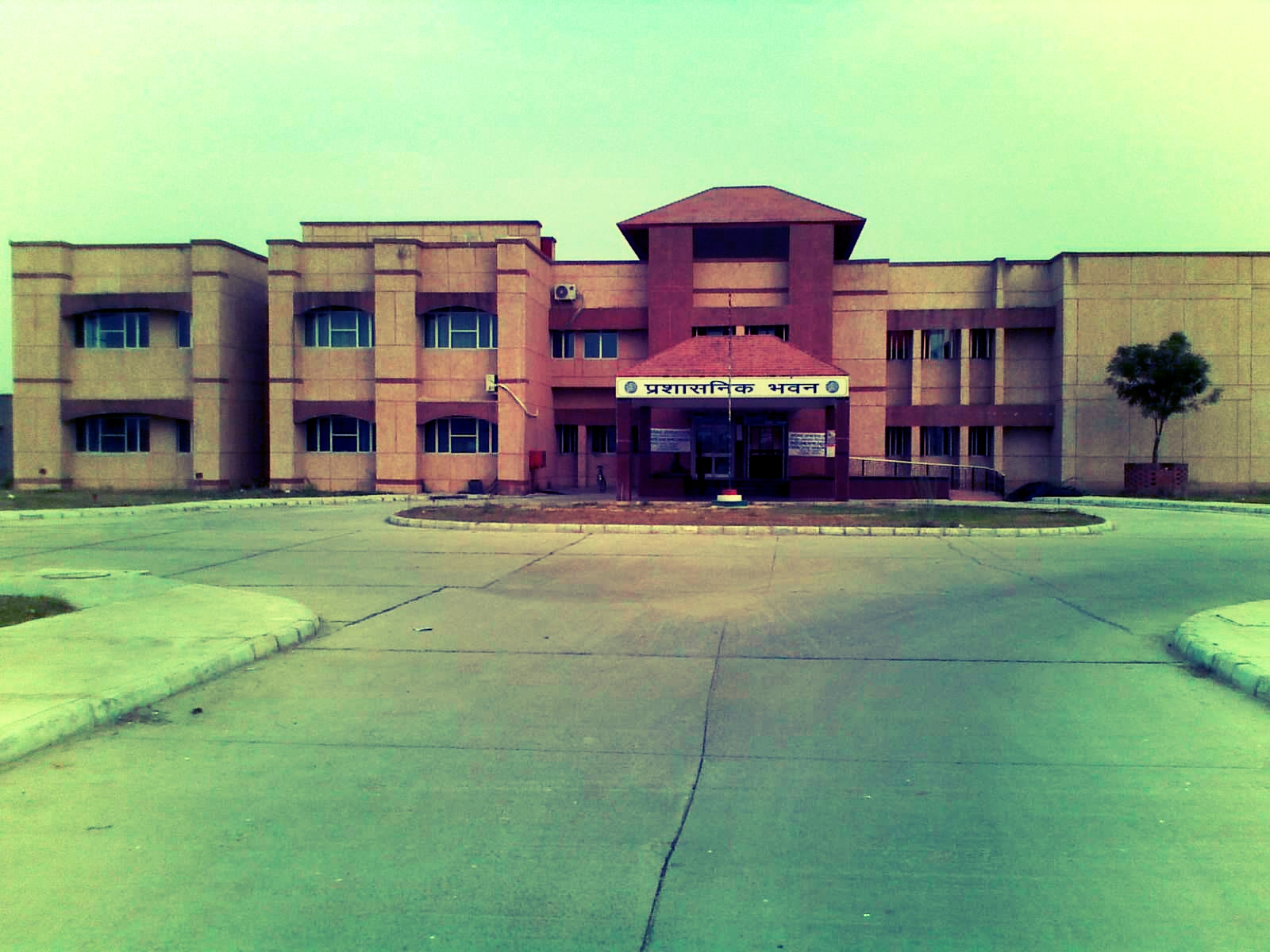
CRW Administrative building

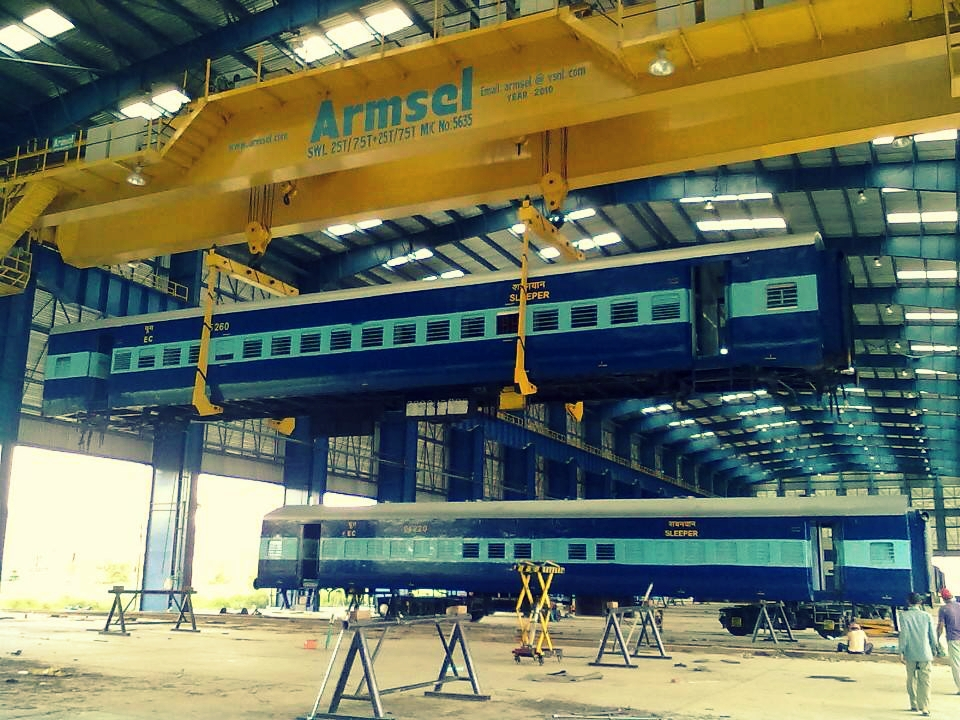
Inside view of CRE

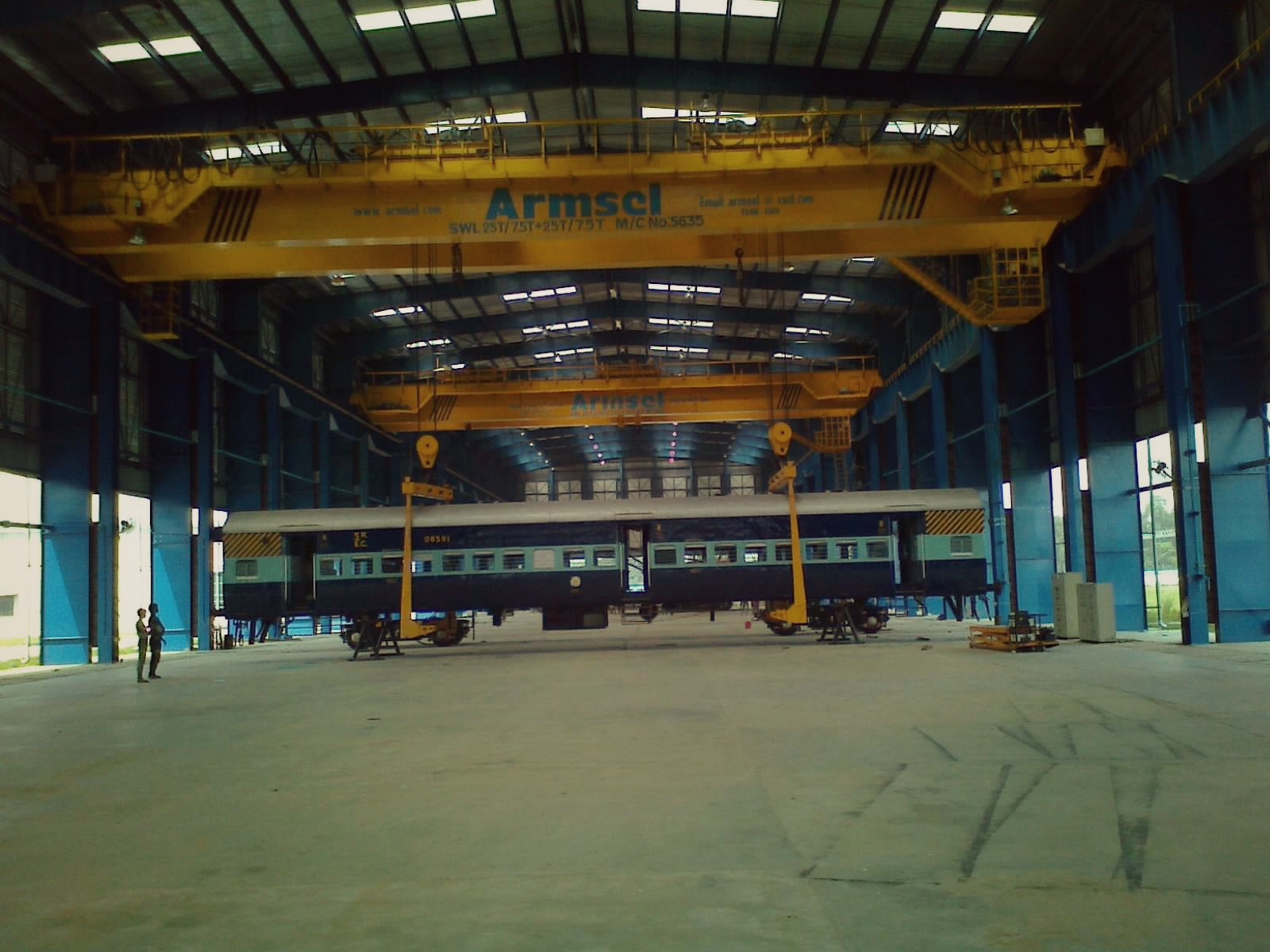
Inside view CRW

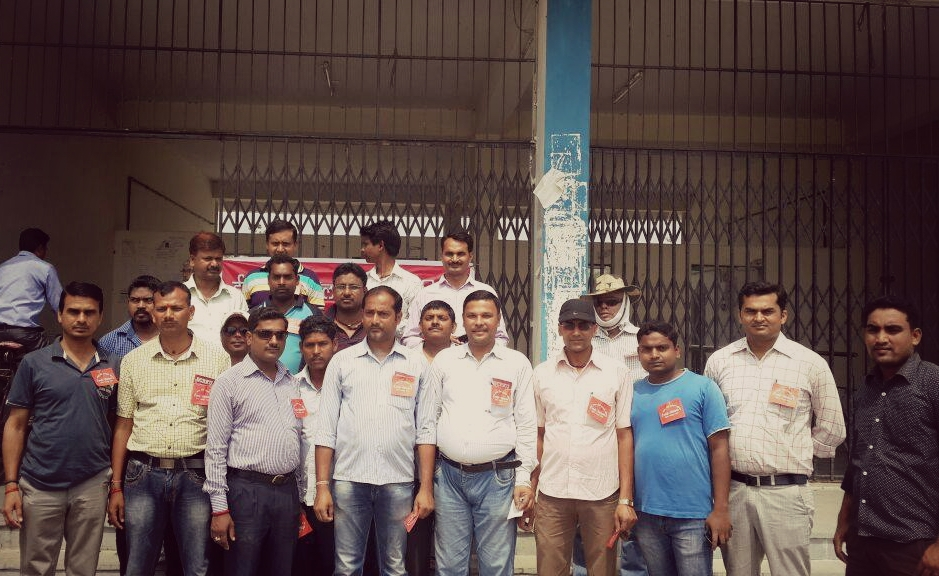
Members celebrate Labour Day

== See also ==
- Harnaut City
- Harnaut Railway Station
