= Railway stations in Nalanda district =

Some of major and minor railway stations in Nalanda district of Bihar state. In February 2012, a Railway Station Development Corporation was set up and it is announced that many stations in Bihar including in Nalanda district would be renovated.

== B ==
- Bihar Sharif Junction railway station

== C ==
- Chandi railway station

== D ==
- Daniyawan railway station

== E ==
- Ekangarsarai railway station

== H ==
- Harnaut railway station
- Hilsa railway station

== I ==
- Islampur railway station

== N ==
- Nalanda railway station

== R ==
- Rajgir railway station
