= Barh railway station =

Railway station in Patna, Bihar, India

BARH

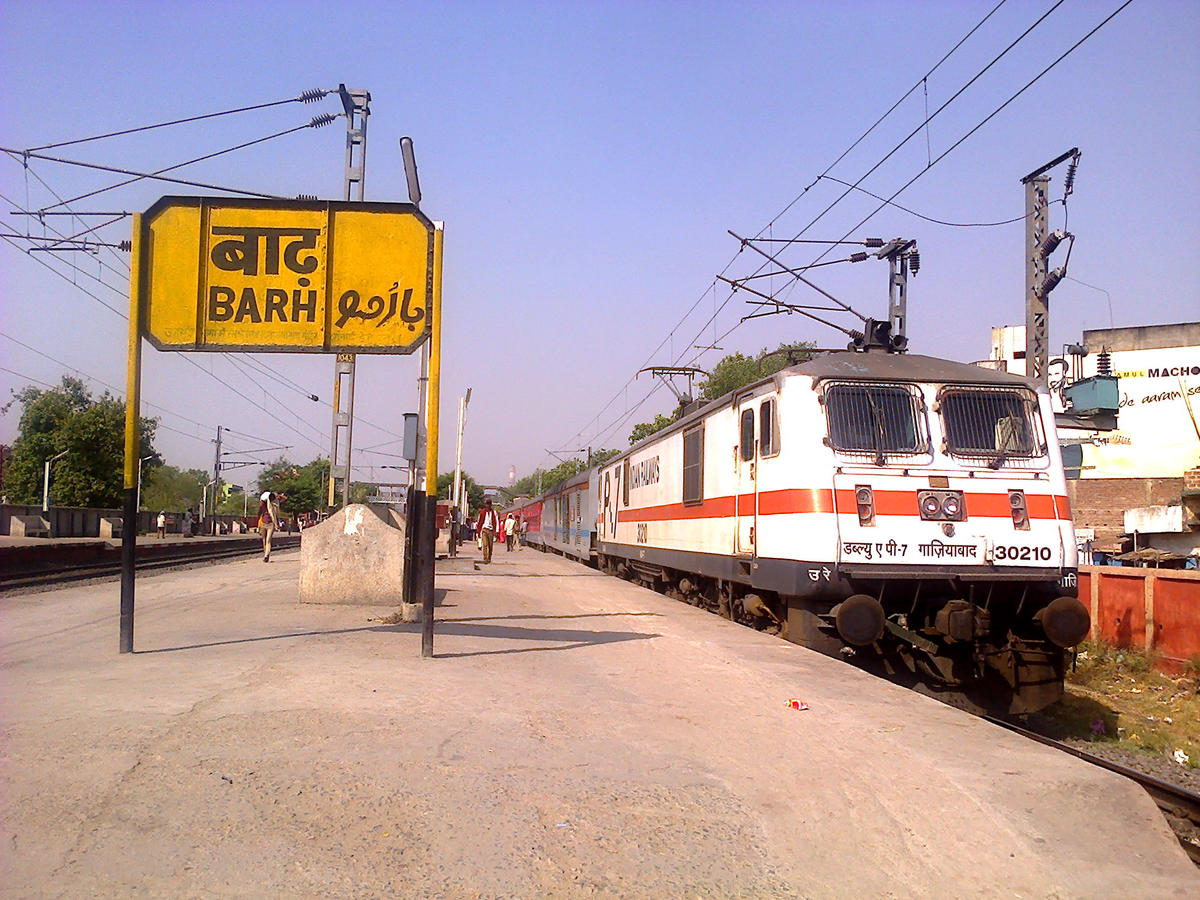
- View of the station board from one of the platforms

General information
- Location: Station Road, Barh, Barh district, Bihar; India
- Coordinates: 25°30′7″N 85°18′20″E
- Elevation: 49 metres (161 ft)
- System: Indian Railways station
- Owner: Indian Railways
- Operator: East Central Railways
- Lines: Howrah–Delhi main line, Asansol–Patna section
- Platforms: 4

Construction
- Structure type: Standard (on-ground station)
- Accessible: Available

Other information
- Status: Functioning
- Station code: BARH
- Zone(s): East Central Railway zone
- Division(s): Danapur

History
- Opened: 1862

Services
Preceding station	Indian Railways	Following station
Sahari Halt towards Asansol Junction or Howrah Junction	Howrah–Delhi main line Asansol–Patna section	Barh Court Halt towards Patna Junction or New Delhi
Route map
Location
- Location within Bihar Location within India

Barh railway station (station code BARH) is a railway station in the Danapur railway division of East Central Railway. Barh is connected to metropolitan areas of India, by the Delhi–Kolkata main line via Mugalsarai–Patna route. Barh station is serving the town of Barh in Patna district in the Indian state of Bihar. Due to its location on the Howrah–Patna–Mughalsarai main line many Patna, Barauni, bound express trains coming from Howrah, Sealdah, stop here.

== History ==
Barh is one of the oldest railway stations on Howrah–Patna–Delhi route. This is a very important station as it is also connected to NTPC Barh, where coal is supplied from Jharkhand via Harnaut.

== Facilities ==
The major facilities available are waiting rooms, computerized reservation facility, and vehicle parking. Vehicles are allowed to enter the station premises. The station also has STD/ISD/PCO telephone booth, toilets, tea stall and book stall.

=== Platforms ===
The four platforms are interconnected with foot overbridges.

== Development ==
The Indian Railways had planned to set up a Railway Station Development Corporation that will work on improving the major railway stations as Barh railway station by building and developing restaurants, shopping areas and food plazas for commercial business and improving passenger amenities. Railway planned to make station as A grade category. After determining the railway stations that need to be good-class station by constructing well. A phased revamping has begun. Deputy chief traffic manager announced that the pending work at the railway tracks and platforms, presently under construction, will be sped up.

== Nearest airports ==
The nearest airports to Barh Station are:

1. Lok Nayak Jayaprakash Airport, Patna 67 kilometres (42 mi)
2. Gaya Airport 123 kilometres (76 mi)

== See also ==
- Barh Super Thermal Power Station
