= Barh Super Thermal Power Station =

Power project in Bihar, India

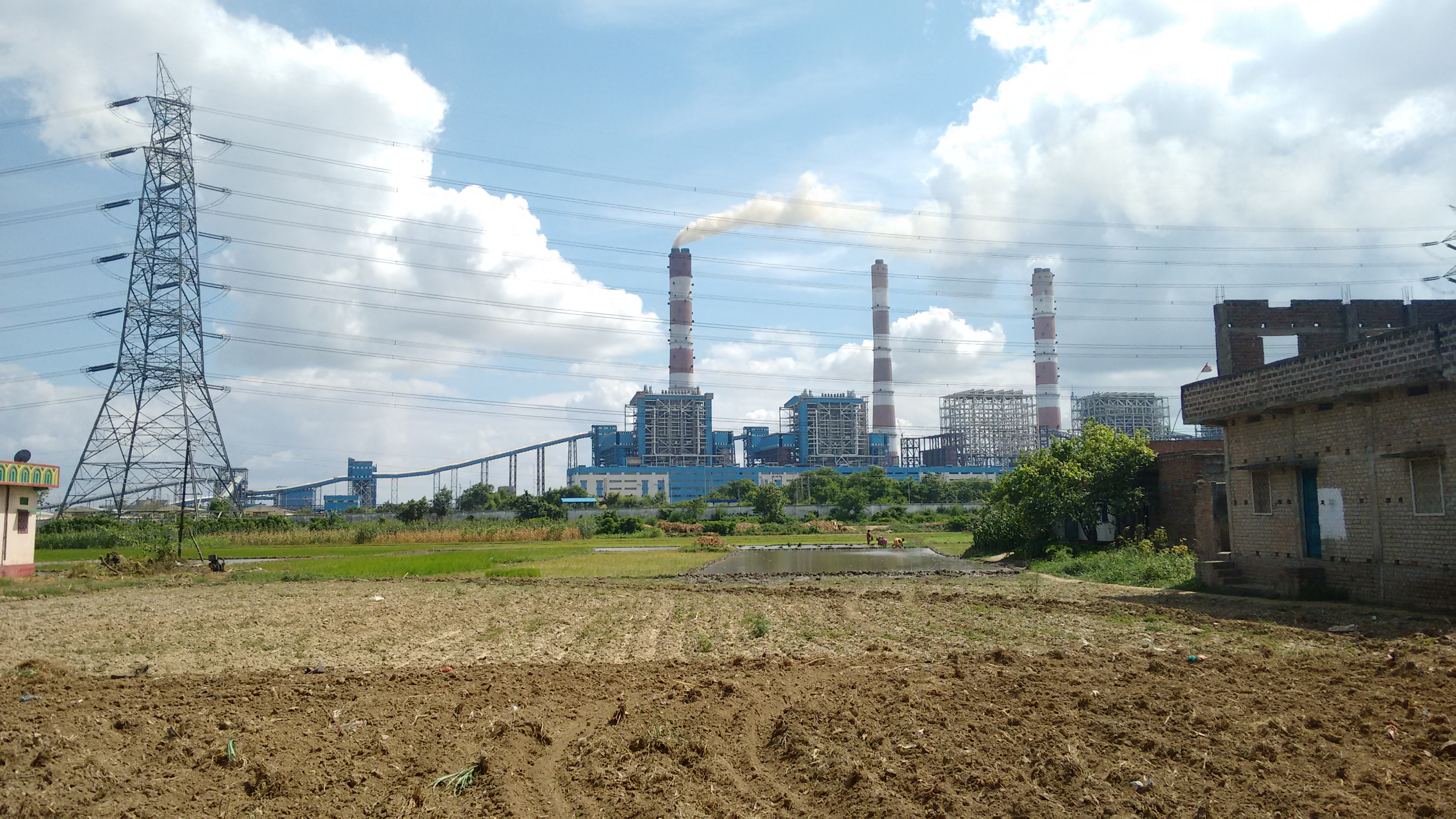
- As seen from NH 30
- Country: India
- Location: Barh, Bihar
- Coordinates: 25°29′11.4″N 85°44′42.6″E
- Status: Operational
- Construction began: 1999
- Commission date: October 2013
- Owner: NTPC

Thermal power station
- Primary fuel: Coal

Power generation
- Units operational: 2 × 660 MW(Stage 2) operational 3 × 660 MW(Stage 1) operational
- Make and model: Doosan Heavy Industries; BHEL
- Nameplate capacity: 3300 MW

External links
- Website: www.ntpc.co.in/index.php?option=com_content&view=article&id=27%3Afuture-plans&catid=30%3Athe-community&Itemid=76&lang=en

Barh Super Thermal Power Station or NTPC Barh is situated at Barh, in the Patna District, in the Indian state of Bihar. NTPC Barh is located barely four kilometres (2.5 mi) east of the Barh sub-division on National Highway-31 in Patna district. The project has been named a mega power project, and is owned by Indian energy company National Thermal Power Corporation.

As of July 2025, both the 1,320 MW (2 × 660 MW) Stage-2 built by BHEL and the 1,980 MW (3 × 660 MW) Barh Stage-1 have started full commercial operations.

Russian firm Technopromexport (TPE) was awarded a contract to provide engineering, procurement, and construction (EPC) services for stage one development in May 2005. However, the contract was terminated in 2014 due to contractual disputes. NTPC awarded a £205m ($294m) contract to Korean firm Doosan Heavy Industries & Construction to design, produce and install three 660 MW boilers for stage one in January 2016.

Bihar's share is 1183 MW from NTPC Barh (26% from stage 1 and 50% from stage 2). The project has been contested as it is nearby Himalayan Range and needs stricter anti-pollution controls.

The main power plant and the township is spread over an area of 1,186 acres (480 ha) of land, which includes 12 villages.

The then Prime Minister, Atal Bihari Vajpayee, had laid the foundation stone of the main plant of stage-1 of NTPC Barh on March 6, 1999. The formal inauguration of its site office and laying of the foundation stone of the training centre at the plant site was done in September 2003.

== Project cost ==
The plant is to produce 3,300 MW of power at a cost of over ₹26,000 crore. The total approved cost of stage-1 (660 MW × 3) has ₹8,692.97 crore. The total approved cost of stage-2 (unit 1) plant is ₹7,688.12 crore.

== Capacity ==
Unit-1 of stage-2 commissioned in November 2013. Unit-2 of stage-2 commissioned in March 2015. The first unit (of stage-I) of NTPC Barh is expected to start generation from December 2019 instead of the scheduled August 2020, while the second and third units of stage-I will be made operational in December 2020 and August 2021, respectively.

Inland Waterways Authority of India received bids in 2013 September for coal movement on 1620 km National Waterway 1 (India) from Haldia to NTPC's Barh which is about 1,000 km (620 mi) away. Currently, coal for the power plant is transported from Jharkhand via rail.

Stage	Unit number	Capacity (MW)	EPC contractor	Date of commissioning	Status
1st	1	660	Doosan Power Systems	November 2021	Running
1st	2	660	Doosan Power Systems	July 2023	Running
1st	3	660	Doosan Power Systems	July 2025	Running
2nd	4	660	Bharat Heavy Electricals	November 2013	Running
2nd	5	660	Bharat Heavy Electricals	March 2015	Running
Total	Five	3300			

== Boiler balance work of Stage-I ==
The boiler balance work of Stage-I (3 × 660 MW)(BSTPP) was allotted to Doosan Power Systems India Ltd, (Korea) Company in January 2016. The work is under contract with Power Mech Projects Ltd.

== Flue gas desulphurisation addition ==
As per MOEF guidelines of Dec-2015 NTPC decided to add FGD units to all units to limit SOX emissions. BHEL was awarded the contract to supply FGD units.
