= Tilaiya Junction railway station =

Railway station in Nawada, Bihar, India

TILAIYA JUNCTION
- Indian Railways logo

General information
- Location: State Highway 8, Tilaiya, Bihar; India
- Coordinates: 24°49′20″N 85°24′08″E
- Elevation: 102 metres (335 ft)
- System: Indian Railways junction station
- Owner: Indian Railways
- Operator: East Central Railway zone
- Lines: Gaya–Kiul line Bakhtiyarpur–Tilaiya line Fatuha–Tilaiya line Koderma–Tilaiya line (under construction)
- Tracks: 5 ft 6 in (1,676 mm) broad gauge

Construction
- Structure type: Standard on ground
- Parking: Yes
- Cycle facilities: Yes
- Accessible: Yes

Other information
- Status: Functioning and under-construction
- Station code: TIA
- Zone(s): East Central Railway
- Division(s): Danapur

History
- Opened: 1879
- Rebuilt: 2023
- Electrified: 2016–2017
Location

Tilaiya Junction railway station is located in Nawada district in the Indian state of Bihar. Tilaiya railway station is at an elevation of 102 metres (335 ft) and is assigned the station code TIA.

== History ==
Gaya was connected to Kiul in 1879 by the South Bihar Railway Company (operated by the East Indian Railway Company).

The Bakhtiyarpur–Rajgir line was extended to Tilaiya in 2010.

== Electrification ==
Feasibility studies for the electrification of the Manpur–Tilaiya–Kiul sector was announced in the rail budget for 2010–11.

== Line extension ==
The line is to be extended from Tilaiya to Koderma.

Preceding station	Indian Railways	Following station
Garobigha Halt towards ?	East Central Railway zone Gaya–Kiul line	Manjhwe towards ?
Hisua towards ?	East Central Railway zone Bakhtiyarpur–Tilaiya line	Terminus
