= Barh =

Indian town in Patna district, Bihar

- Town and Sub-division
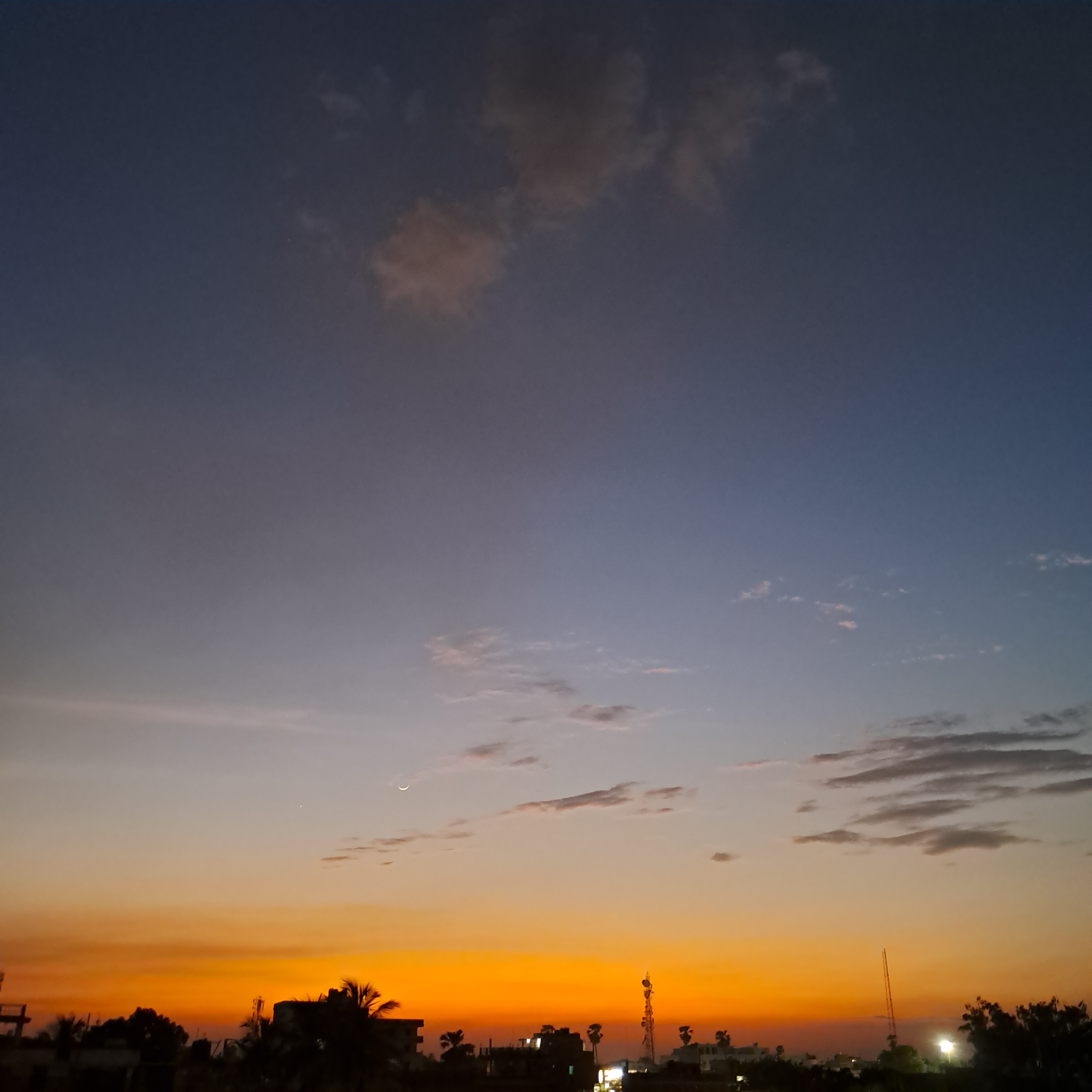

- Location in Bihar, India Barh (India)
- Coordinates: 25.48°N 85.72°E
- Country: India
- State: Bihar
- Division: Patna
- District: Patna

Government
  - Body: Nagar Parishad

Area
  - Total: 98 km^{2} (38 sq mi)
- Elevation: 47 m (154 ft)

Population (2011)
  - Total: 320,000 (approx.)
  - Density: 3,300/km^{2} (8,500/sq mi)
- Demonym: Barh

Languages
  - Official: Magahi, Hindi
- Time zone: UTC+5:30 (IST)
- PIN: 803212,803213,803214
- Telephone code: 06132
- Vehicle registration: BR-01
- Website: patna.nic.in

Barh is a sub division of Patna District. It is a town and one of the 6 sub-division of Patna district, Bihar in India. It is located on the southern bank of the Ganges.

== Population ==
According to the 2011 Census of India, Barh had a total population of 316,348 residents, with 162,354 males and 153,994 females.

== Administration ==
The Barh sub-division (Tehsil) is headed by an IAS or state Civil service officer of the rank of Sub-Divisional Magistrate (SDM).

=== Blocks ===
The Barh Tehsil is divided into 7 Blocks, each headed by a Block Development Officer (BDO). List of Blocks is as follows:

1. Athmalgola
2. Mokama
3. Belchi
4. Ghoswari
5. Pandarak
6. Bakhtiarpur
7. Barh

== Politics ==
Barh is a part of the Barh Assembly constituency under the Munger Lok Sabha constituency. It is also the oldest subdivision in India.

== History ==
=== Peace Treaty of Barh ===
In 1495, after the sack of Patna, Sikandar Lodi advanced towards Bengal, but a non-aggression pact was made between the Delhi and the Bengal armies. It was decided that the territory to the east of Barh would be controlled by Bengal's ruler, while those to the west would be controlled by the Delhi empire.

=== Sarai ===
During the Mughal period, Barh had a large sarai with 200 rooms for travelers/traders built by Sher Shah Suri.

=== Rennell's Survey ===
In 1776, James Rennell, also called the "Father of Indian Geography", surveyed Bengal and listed prominent destinations.

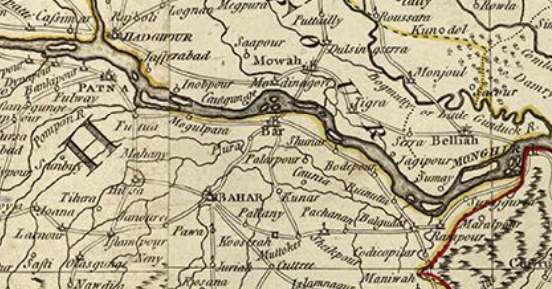
A zoomed view of Rennel's 1776 Bengal map focussing on Barh (Bar) and nearby locations

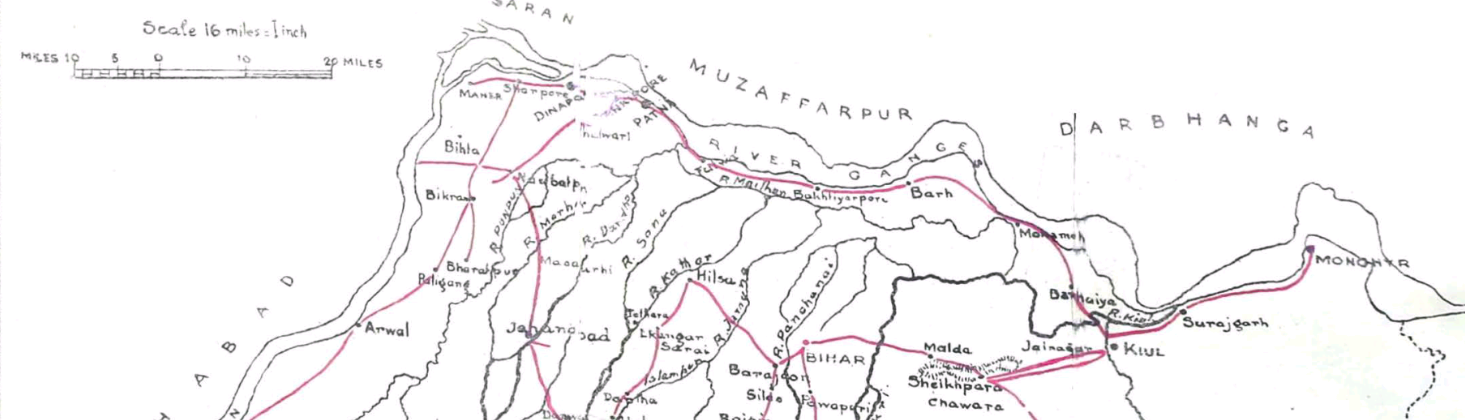
A zoomed-in map of barh in 1812 as described in Buchanan travelogue

=== Barh Railway line ===
On 10 November 1877, the Barh railway station was opened to the public.

=== Plague ===
Between the 1890s to 1910, Barh and Patna were afflicted by the plague. It is believed that the 1898 plague came by sea by rats aboard infected ships, though it first appeared in the British India Steam Navigation Company's wharf. The two main factors for the spread of the plague were believed to be the high presence of rats and houses with poor hygiene and bad ventilation.

The population of the extended Barh subdivision decreased from 408,256 in 1891 to 365,327 in 1901 due to the plague.

=== Sati incident ===
In 1928, Sampati Kuer, a young widow from Berhna village, committed sati on the funeral pyre of her deceased husband. The British government suspected foul play and sentenced ten people to prison, including her brother Murlidhar Pande, as sati was outlawed 100 years earlier by the British government.

== NTPC Barh ==
NTPC Limited is India's largest power-generating company. The former Prime Minister of India, Atal Bihari Vajpayee, laid the foundation stone of the main plant of stage 1 of NTPC Barh Super Thermal Power Station on 6 March 1999.

== List of villages ==
The list of villages in Barh Block (under Barh Tehsil) is as follows:

- Sadikpur
- saksohra
- Agwanpur
- Ranabigha
- Berhana East
- Berhana West
- Bhatgawn
- Dhanwan Mobarakpur
- Ekdanga
- Ibrahimpur
- Nadawan
- Naruada
- Rahimpur Rupas
- Rangbigha
- Sarkatti Saidpur
- Sahari
- Achuara
- DAHAUR
- Billour
