= Danapur railway division =

Railway division of India

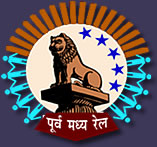

Overview
- Headquarters: Danapur, Patna
- Reporting mark: DNR
- Locale: Bihar and Uttar Pradesh, India
- Dates of operation: 1925–present

Technical
- Track gauge: Broad
- Previous gauge: Metre
- Length: 907.483 kilometres (563.884 mi) (as of 2026)

Other
- Website: ecr.indianrailways.gov.in

Danapur railway division is one of the five railway divisions under the jurisdiction of East Central Railway zone of the Indian Railways. It is located in Danapur of the Indian state of Bihar. The other railway divisions are Sonpur, Samastipur, Pandit Deen Dayal Upadhyaya and Dhanbad. During the financial year 2025–26, Danapur railway division recorded its highest-ever gross earnings of approximately ₹2,362 crore.

== History ==
It was formed as one of the six divisions of the East Indian Railway Company on 1 January 1925 along with Howrah, Asansol, Prayagraj, Lucknow, and Moradabad. The Eastern Railway was established on 14 April 1952 and Danapur division came under the control of Eastern Railway. After the formation of East Central Railway zone, the division was integrated into it on 1 October 2002.

Association with railway zones
Period	Railway zone	Notes
1925–1952	East Indian Railway Company	Danapur division formed part of the East Indian Railway.
1952–2002	Eastern Railway	Became part of the newly constituted Eastern Railway following the reorganisation of Indian Railways on 14 April 1952.
1 October 2002–present	East Central Railway	Transferred to the newly created East Central Railway with headquarters at Hajipur.

== Jurisdiction ==
As of 2026, the division had about 907.483 kilometres (563.884 mi) of route length in Bihar and Uttar Pradesh. The division includes twelve districts of the state of Bihar which are Buxar, Bhojpur, Patna, Lakhisarai, Jamui, Nawada, Sheikhpura, Jehanabad, Nalanda and two districts of Uttar Pradesh which are Ghazipur and Chandauli. Presently the Danapur division's jurisdiction includes following sections:

- Jhajha to Kuchman
- Patna to Gaya (excluding)
- Kiul to Gaya (excluding)
- Dildarnagar to Tarighat
- Bakhtiyarpur to Rajgir
- Mokama to Simaria (excluding)
- Patna Sahib to Patna Ghat
- Patna–Digha Ghat line
- Fatwa-Islampur
- Rajgir-Tilaya
- Bihar Sharif to Daniyawan
- Mokama to Mokama Ghat (but not in operation now).

S.No	Section	Route Kilometer
1	Jhajha-Patna part of (Main Line)	180.78
2	Patna-Pandit Deen Dayal Upadhyaya part of (Main Line)	202.82
3	Patna-Gaya	90.80
4	Kiul-Gaya	122
5	Bakhtiyarpur-Rajgir	54.00
6	Rampur Dumra (Mokama)-Rajendra Pul (Simaria)	11.90
7	Dildarnagar-Tarighat	19.00
8	Fatuha-Islampur	43.35
9	Patna Sahib-Patna Ghat	0^
10	R’Block-Digha	0^
11	Rajgir-Tilaya	46.081
12	Bihar Sharif-Daniyawan	38.287
13	Phulwarisharif- Danapur- Patliputra- Pahlejaghat	22.058
14	Kiul – Bhagalpur	0.80
15	Paimar - Bandhua	13.70
16	Bakhityarpur – Karnauti – Barh	4.70
17	Tilaiya - Kherundh	24.50
18	Sheikhpua – Barbigha	11.70
19	Islampur – Natesar	21.007
	Total	907.483

- ^Note: The Patna Sahib–Patna Ghat (0.87 Km) and R Block–Digha (8.58 Kms) sections were subsequently transferred to the Government of Bihar in 2024 and 2018 respectively and are no longer under the jurisdiction of Danapur railway division.

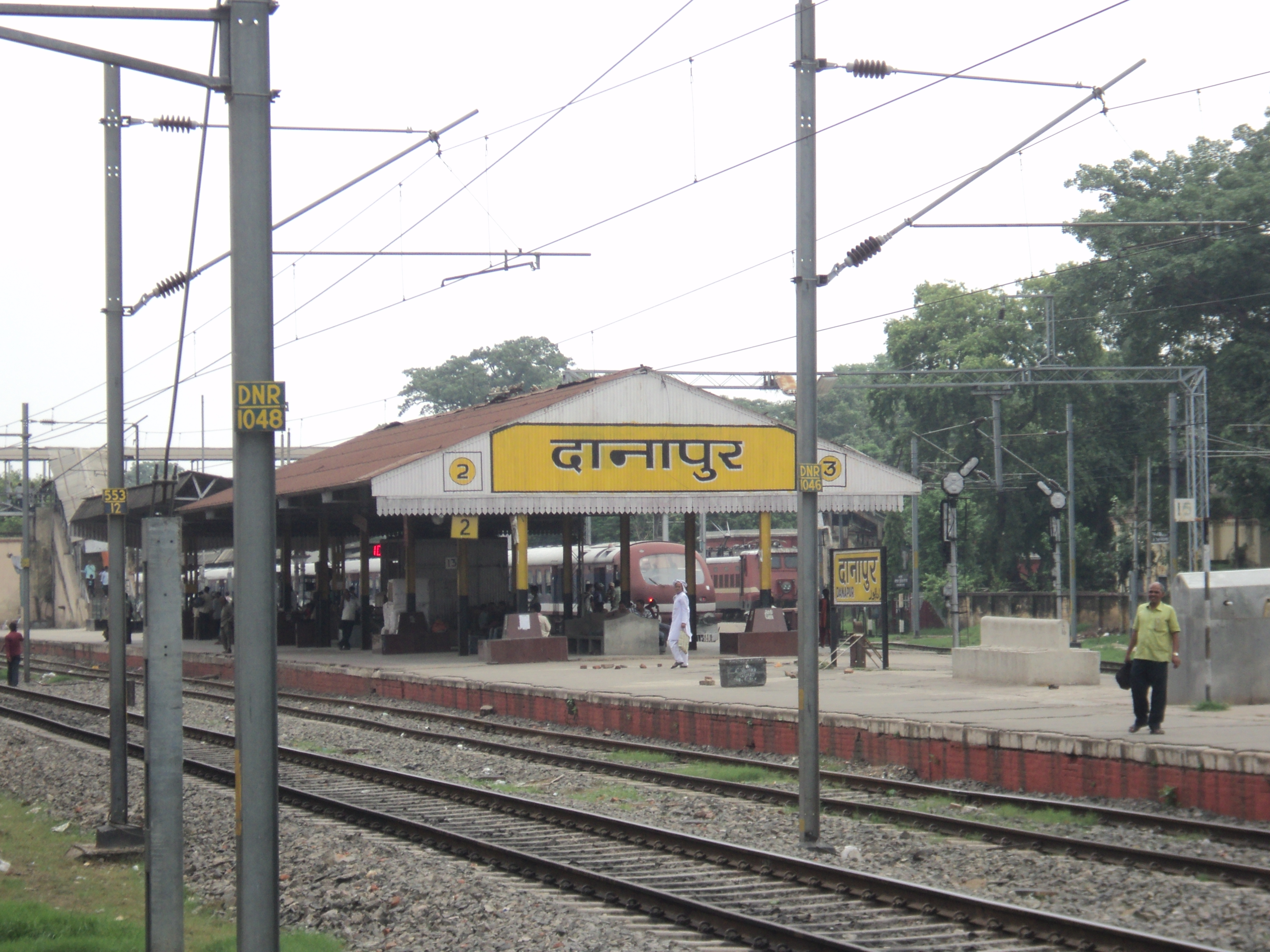
Danapur Railway Station

== Station categorisation ==
Indian Railways categorises stations based on passenger earnings and footfall. Prior to 2017, stations were classified into categories ranging from A1, A, B, C, D, E and F. In November 2017, the Ministry of Railways introduced a revised classification system, replacing the earlier categories with Non-Suburban Group (NSG 1–6), Suburban Group (SG 1–3) and Halt Group (HG 1–3). The following table lists the stations of Danapur division according to their current NSG classification. Although the A1–F categorisation has been discontinued, it continues to be widely used by the general public, railway enthusiasts and in informal references. For historical context, the pre-2017 categorisation is also provided below.

=== Current categorisation (2017–present) ===
Station categorisation (2023–24)
Category of station	No. of stations	Stations
NSG-1	1	Patna Junction
NSG-2	3	Danapur, Patliputra Junction, Rajendra Nagar Terminal
NSG-3	6	Ara Junction, Bakhtiyarpur Junction, Buxar, Jhajha, Kiul Junction and Mokama Junction.
NSG-4	9	Barh, Dildarnagar Junction, Hathidah Junction, Jamui, Jehanabad, Luckeesarai Junction, Patna Sahib, Rajgir and Taregna.
NSG-5	19	Barhiya, Bela, Bihar Sharif, Bihiya, Bihta, Dumraon, Ekangarsarai, Fatuha Junction, Gahmar, Gidhaur, Harnaut, Hilsa, Islampur, Khusropur, Nawada, Raghunathpur, Sheikhpura, Warisaliganj and Zamania.
NSG-6	44	Phulwari Sharif, Mananpur, Koelwar, Gulzarbagh, Kashichak, Punpun, Tehta, Bhadaura, Kulharia, Wena, Rajendra Pul, Jahanabad Court, Sirari, Chausa, Banahi, Chakand, Parsa Bazar, Banka Ghat, Twining Ganj, Sakaldiha, Athmal Gola, Pothahi, Nadwan, Sadisopur, Neora, Nadaul, Punarakh, Hathidah Upper, Pawapuri Road, Mor, Tarighat, Karauta, Mankatha, Khudaganj Bazar, Paimar, Garsanda, Karota Patner, Karjara, Oro (Jagdishpur), Rampur Dumra, Gonpura, Fazalchak, Top Sarthua and Asthwan.
SG-1/2/3	0	none
HG-1	1	Digha Bridge Halt
HG-2	15	Bhalui Halt, Chaura, Dadpur, Daniyawan Bazar Halt, Dumri Halt, Jamira Halt, Karhiya, Karona Halt, Manjhauligram Halt, Pali Halt, Punpun Ghat, Sachiwalay Halt, Sohsarai, Wanawar Halt and Khusalpur Harnaha Halt.
HG-3	91	Rahui Road, Diyawan, Ner, Neema, Sikariya, Jai Prakash Mahuli, Achuara, Karadih, Juniar, Deep Nagar, Chotki Masauri, Karnauti, Champapur, Jagjivan, Masaudhi Court, Budhdeochak Yadav Nagar, Dekpura, Seonan, Kauriya, Sarvodaya, Lohanda, Lemuabad, V. V. Giri, Imlibigha, Ambapendapur, Chatar, Amarsahid Jagdeo Prasad, Baghighospur, Meera Bigha, Shivnar, Niyamatpur, Niyazipur, Basuachak, Mai, Barabar, Kamta, Chandi, Rukhai, Sarhula, Barh Court, Kharhuara, Railey English, Mahuri, Sadipur, Bulahpur, Veer Kunwarpur Darauli, Mahatbania, Dhiradar Jwas Halt, Pawani Kumarpur, Adarshmanpur, Shahid Jitendra, Murahari, Brahpur, Kachniyana, Garobigha, Gangasarai, Gohrigram, Derhgaon, Ore, Kundar, Naika Road, Khurrampur Halt, Nadaon, Aungaridham, Patel, Ramanand Tiwary, Tungi, Kanaipur, Bahorachandil, Ushia Khas, Ram Bhawan, Gokul Nagar, Hisua, Kolhana, Lachubigha, Lakhochak, Machariyawan, Maheshleta, Mohammadpur, Ram Govind Singh Mahuli, Sarsu, Sigriyawan, Sukhdas Gram, Sultanpur Gram, Adpa, Chamuchak, Bajidpur, Marachi, Gauspur and Malti Halt.
Total	189	operational stations

=== Pre-2017 categorisation ===
As of 2014, Division had 232 stations out of which only Patna Junction railway station is categorized as A1 station & nine are categorized as A stations based earnings.

Category of station	No. of stations	Names of stations
A-1	1	Patna Junction
A	9	Ara, Buxar, Danapur, Rajendra Nagar Terminal, Bakhtiyarpur, Mokama, Jamui, Kiul & Patna Sahib.
B	9	Dildarnagar, Dumraon, Barh, Hathidah, Harnaut, Lakhisarai, Jhajha, Bihar Sharif Junction, Rajgir.
C	0	
D	18	Bihta, Fatuha, Bihiya, Gulzarbagh, Jehanabad, Nawadah, Sheikhpura, Zamania, Barahiya, Islampur, Ekangarsarai, Gidhaur, Jehanabad Court, Khusropur, Manpur, Raghunathpur, Taregna & Warisaliganj .
E	54	Athmalgola, Banahi, Bakaghat, Bansipur, Baruna, Bela, Bhadaura, Chakand, Chusa, Dheena, Gahmar, Hilsa, Karauta, Karisath, Kashi chak, Kuchman, Kulharia, Makhdumpur, Mankatha, More, Nadaul, Nalanda, Neora, Parsa Bazar, Phulwari Sharif, Pothi, Punarakh, Punpun, Rajendrapul, Rampurdumra, Sakaldiha, Sirari, Tarighat, Tehta, Tilaiya, Twiningganj, Wazirganj, WENA, Baghi bardiha, Daniyawan, Garsanda, Hardashbigha, Jamuawan, Karjara, Koilwar, Sadisopur, Salimpurbihar, SILO, Tekabigha, Tulsi Ashram, Nateshar, Jethian and Oro Dumari.
F	125	halts
Total	216	-

- Rest are not in operation.

== See also ==
- East Central Railway zone
- Divisions of Indian Railways
- Danapur Railway Station
