= Bakhtiyarpur–Tilaiya line =

Railway line in India

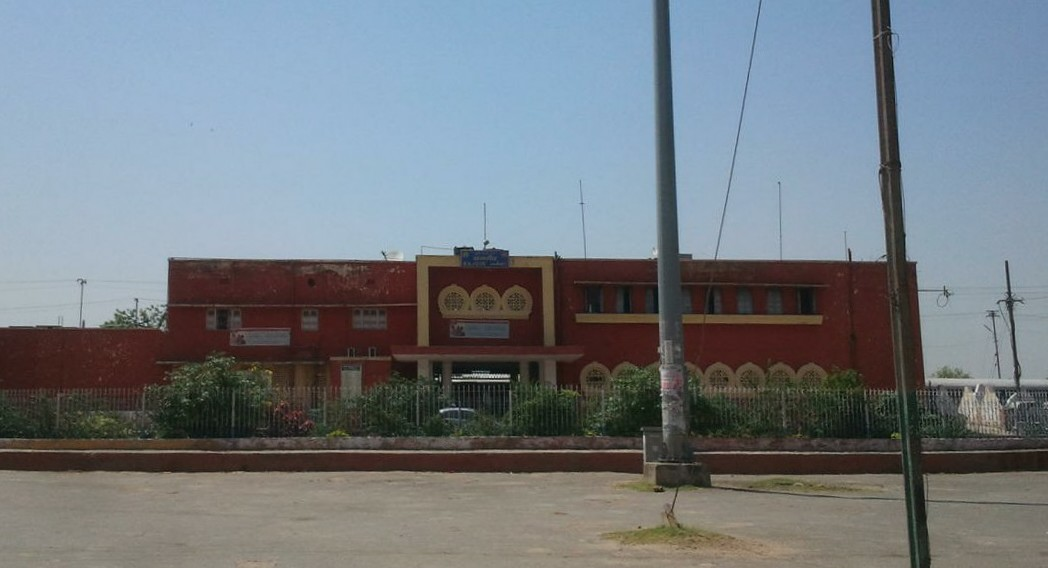
- Rajgir is an important railway station on Bakhtiyarpur–Tilaiya line

Overview
- Status: Operational
- Owner: Indian Railways
- Termini: Bakhtiyarpur; Tilaiya

Service
- Operator(s): East Central Railway

History
- Opened: 1962 / 2010

Technical
- Line length: 100 km (62 mi)
- Number of tracks: 1
- Track gauge: 5 ft 6 in (1,676 mm) broad gauge
- Electrification: 25 kV 50 Hz AC OHLE in 2016–2017 b/w Bakhtiyarpur and Rajgir
- Operating speed: Up to 100 km/h

The Bakhtiyarpur–Tilaiya line is a railway line connecting Bakhtiyarpur on the Howrah–Delhi main line and Tilaiya on the Gaya–Kiul line, both in the Indian state of Bihar.

== History ==
The line has its origins in Bakhtiyarpur–Bihar Sharif light railway, which was a 2 ft 6 in (762 mm)-wide narrow-gauge railway laid by Martin's Light Railways from Bakhtiyarpur to Bihar Sharif in 1903 and extended to Rajgir in 1911. It was converted to 1,676 mm (5 ft 6 in) in 1962. The broad-gauge line was extended from Rajgir to Tilaiya and opened in 2010. The line is to be extended up to Koderma. Feasibility studies for the electrification of the Manpur–Tilaiya–Kiul sector and Fatwa–Islampur–Bakhtiyarpur–Rajgir sectors were announced in the rail budget for 2010–11. Survey work for doubling of this line has been completed and is awaiting the green signal from Railway Safety Commissioner.

== Electrification ==
The Bakhtiyarpur–Rajgir section was electrified in 2016–2017, while the Rajgir–Tilaiya section was electrified in 2017. The Tilaiya–Gaya section was electrified along with the Gaya–Kiul line in October 2018.

== Workshops ==
Carriage Repair Workshop in Harnaut has the capacity to repair and refurbish 500 or more coaches annually.

== Important stations ==
Bihar Sharif Junction, Rajgir, Nalanda and Harnaut are important stations on this line.

Rajgir and Nalanda, located on this line, are popular tourist destinations and are part of the Buddhist Circuit of Bihar. Pawapuri is a significant site on the Jain Circuit of Bihar.

== Sections ==
- Bakhtiyarpur–Rajgir section
- Rajgir–Tilaiya–Gaya section
- Daniyawan–Bihar Sharif–Sheikhpura line
- Harnaut–Mokama section
