= Kulczyk =

Kulczyk is a surname. Notable people with the surname include:

- Dominika Kulczyk (born 1977), Polish businesswoman and philanthropist
- Grażyna Kulczyk (born 1950), Polish investor, art collector and philanthropist
- Henry Kulczyk, American politician from Idaho
- Henryk Kulczyk (1925–2013), Polish businessman, soldier, and social activist
- Jan Kulczyk (1950–2015), Polish billionaire businessman
- Sebastian Kulczyk (born 1980), Polish businessman

== Other ==
- Kulczyk Foundation, a Polish philanthropic foundation
- Kulczyk Investments, an international investment company
