= BBHT =

BBHT may refer to:

- Barabar halt railway station, a halt railway station on the Patna-Gaya line in the Indian state of Bihar
- Blue-Blazed Trails, a trail system in Connecticut
- Bugsworth Basin Heritage Trust, a British organisation for canal restoration
