= Qemetica =

Polish chemical industry group

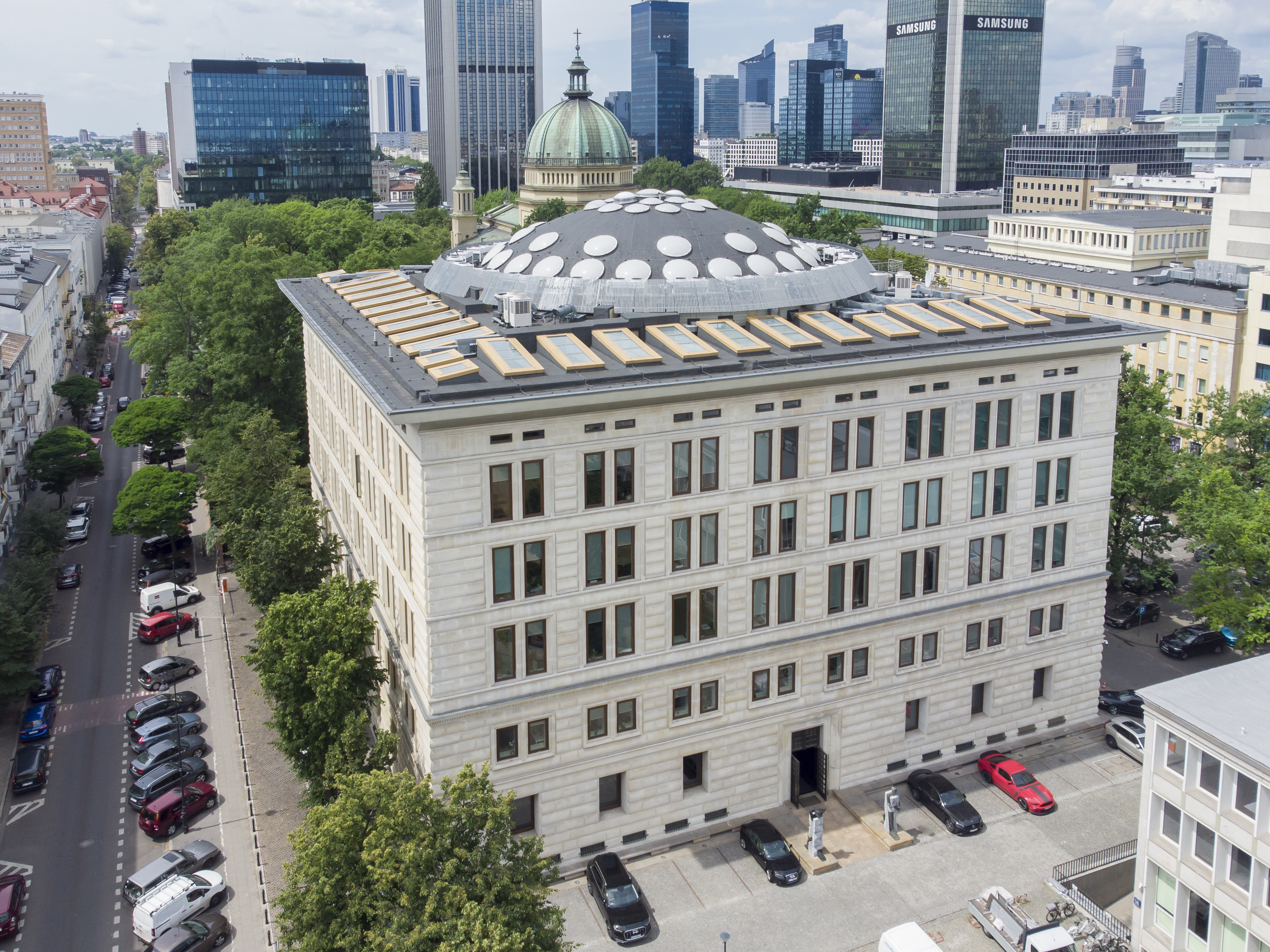
- The registered office of Qemetica at Ufficio Primo in Warsaw.
- Company type: Joint stock
- ISIN: PLCiech00018
- Industry: Chemicals
- Founded: 1945; 81 years ago; Łódź, Poland
- Headquarters: Warsaw, Poland
- Key people: Sebastian Kulczyk (Chairman of the Supervisory Board); Dawid Jakubowicz (President of the Management Board)
- Products: soda, salt, agro, glass, silicates,
- Revenue: ▲PLN 3.5 billion (2017)
- Operating income: ▲PLN 808.1 million (2017)
- Net income: ▲PLN 394 million (2017)
- Owner: KI Chemistry S.À.R.L (51,14%); ING Otwarty Fundusz Emerytalny - 9,49% Towarzystwa Funduszy Inwestycyjnych PZU S.A. - 5,12%
- Number of employees: 3,900 (2014)
- Subsidiaries: CIECH Soda Romania; CIECH Sarzyna; CIECH Soda Deutschland; CIECH Sarzyna; CIECH Pianki; Proplan; CIECH Vitrosilicon; CIECH Cargo
- Website: ciechgroup.com/en/

Qemetica S.A. (formerly known as CIECH SA), is a Polish chemical company headquartered in Warsaw and one of the leading companies in the European chemical industry. It is a major producer of sodium carbonate and sodium bicarbonate in the European Union, Europe's largest provider of sodium silicate and Poland's top producer of crop protection products.

Qemetica, then known as the CIECH Group, was founded in Łódź, Poland in 1945 and currently consists of 8 manufacturing sites, in addition to trade and service businesses. Its annual revenue places the company among the top fifty Polish companies.

In 2014, the company employed more than 3,900 people in Poland, Germany and Romania. Qemetica was listed on the Warsaw Stock Exchange since February 2005 until March 2024, and on the Frankfurt Stock Exchange since August 2016.

== Products ==
Qemetica is one of the largest Polish exporters and investors abroad. It offers high-end chemical products such as: soda ash (the second largest European provider), baking soda, salt, polyester, agricultural products and glass products, as well as other chemicals. They are used by glass, food and furniture industries, for detergent production, in agriculture and in construction.

== History ==
The company was founded in 1945 as state-controlled Centrala Importowo-Eksportowa Chemikalii i Aparatury Chemicznej" (Import-Export Centre for Chemicals and Chemical Instruments). From the very beginning, the company was exporting its products — soda ash, carbide and zinc white — to 12 countries. The first registered office was located in Łódź, Poland. In 1946, it moved its headquarters to Warsaw.

In the following years, the company continued its operations, exporting its products to an increasing number of global markets. In the early 1960s, the company was renamed "Centrala Handlu Zagranicznego CIECH" (Foreign Trade Centre CIECH), in which "CIECH" was an abbreviation of the name "Centrala Importowo-Eksportowa Chemikaliów" (Import-Export Centre for Chemicals). The 1960s and 1970s brought the company successes on the sulphur market (when Polish "yellow gold" held the second place in the world in export of this raw material), nitrogenous fertilisers, pharmaceuticals, cosmetics, paints and varnishes. In 1976, nearly 95% of Polish chemical products were sold on foreign markets through CHZ CIECH.

At the turn of the 1980s, at the beginning of the political transformation, CIECH was the largest foreign trade centre, with a monopoly for the delivery of oil to Polish refineries. In the 1990s, at the time when the centre celebrated its 45th anniversary, CIECH held the 97th place in the top hundred leading companies of the world. Poland's transition from a centrally planned economy to a free market economy entailed the loss of the monopoly for the delivery of oil. This coerced the company to transform into a modern and free market chemical company.

Therefore, in the 1990s, the company initiated the process of building a capital group, concentrating major national manufacturing sites around itself. These transformations were crowned by the company's entry to the Warsaw Stock Exchange in 2005, which proved a great success. It provided the company with access to capital and means of implementing bold activation measures. As a result of the company's listing on the stock exchange, its notability increased, along with credibility and brand recognition. One year later, CIECH confirmed its position as one of the leaders of the European chemical industry by completing the purchase of the first foreign manufacturing subsidiary of the Group, a Romanian soda factory, "US Govora" (now: "CIECH Soda Romania"). In the same year, "ZCh Organika-Sarzyna" (now: "CIECH Sarzyna") was also purchased. In 2007, the company acquired a German soda manufacturer, "Sodawerk Stassfurt" (now: "CIECH Soda Deutschland"), and fortified its position as the second largest soda manufacturer in Europe.

In July 2013, the Ciech Group, implementing the restructuring assumptions consisting in focusing its activity on the production of soda, signed an agreement for the sale of Zakłady Chemiczne w Alwernia to a company belonging to the KERMAS group. The value of the transaction is US$13.4 million.

In 2014, CIECH acquired a new majority shareholder, the international investment group Kulczyk Investments.

On July 22, 2015, the supervisory board dismissed Dariusz Krawczyk from the position of president, appointing Maciej Tybura to this position. On October 8, 2015, Sebastian Kulczyk became the chairman of the supervisory board.

In August 2016, Ciech S.A. shares were admitted to trading on the Frankfurt Stock Exchange under a dual listing.

On September 10, 2018, Maciej Tybura resigned for personal reasons. The duties of the president were taken over by Dawid Jakubowicz, who on December 5, 2018, became the president of the company.

In 2021, the company signed a Letter of Intent to cooperate with Synthos Green Energy on the development and use of a small modular reactor (SMR) and micro modular reactor (MMR) technologies.

On 3 March 2024, the company was delisted from the Warsaw Stock Exchange after receiving permission from the Financial Supervision Authority. On 1 June 2024, the company changed its official name from CIECH to Qemetica as part of its new strategy for 2024–2029.

In November 2024, Qemetica signed an agreement to buy silicas products from Pittsburgh-based American company PPG Industries.

== See also ==
- Economy of Poland
- List of Polish companies
