= Kulczyk Foundation =

Polish women's rights foundation

- Formation: 2013
- Headquarters: Warsaw
- Location: Poland
- President: Dominika Kulczyk
- Website: kulczykfoundation.org.pl

The Kulczyk Foundation is a Polish private foundation founded in 2013 by Grażyna Kulczyk, Jan Kulczyk, and Dominika Kulczyk, who has been the President of the foundation since its establishment. Apart from Dominika Kulczyk, the foundation is managed by Przemysław Pohrybieniuk, the managing director, and the board of directors consisting of Sebastian Kulczyk, Waldemar Dąbrowski, Janusz Reiter, and Grzegorz Stanisławski. The foundation's main objective is to fight against gender inequality and create a more equitable society for women and girls around the world through local educational initiatives, partnerships with communities, and cooperation with NGOs with similar objectives. The foundation also focuses on improving the living standards of people suffering from poverty who lack access to education, healthcare, and other basic human needs, as well as projects aimed at spreading awareness of current gender inequality issues. The foundation has completed more than 200 projects in over 63 countries.

== Activities ==
The foundation supports aid projects in countries which lie on the last positions created by the Human Development Index, HDI (Human Development Index). It helps countries affected by poverty and various kinds of natural disasters. It works with locally operating international NGOs supporting them through joint projects. Kulczyk Foundation allocates 100% of its own and 100% of funds raised from donors for humanitarian action.

A characteristic feature of the activities of Kulczyk Foundation is the principle of "smart aid" – wise help, that does not burden the budget of the organization long-term presence in one place, at the same time leaving a lasting and positive changes in the lives of the inhabitants of the regions visited.

== Statutory objectives ==
The means for the Foundation's statutory purposes are obtained by its founders' donations, as well as through direct fundraising activities targeted at businesses. The daily operations of the Foundation and the idea of volunteering are presented in program "Domino Effect" created jointly by TVN Television and Kulczyk Foundation.

== Documentaries ==
=== "Efekt Domina" documentary-series ===
The most recent documentary created by the Kulczyk Foundation, in collaboration with the Polish TV-channel TVN, is "Efekt Domina" or "Domino Effect". In this documentary-series, Dominika Kulczyk, together with a team from the foundation, present methods used by the foundation in tackling the issues within their scope. "Efekt Domina" first aired on March 2, 2014. Since then, the documentary-series has produced seven seasons with a total of 54 episodes, each filmed in a different community suffering from different issues. As of February 2021, the series is still being aired on Polish TV-channel TVN, with a new season being released on an annual basis. The documentary series has produced – among other locations – episodes in:

- Cambodia – construction of houses in collaboration with Habitat for Humanity for homeless residents of Phnom Penh
- Madagascar – construction of a school in collaboration with SEED Madagascar
- Haiti – construction of a bridge as part of the Garrate project with Bridges to Prosperity
- Zambia – supporting micro-enterprise together with the COMACO organization
- Philippines – repairing the damages caused by typhoon Haiyan together with volunteers from the All Hands Volunteers organization

=== CNN Freedom Project ===
The foundation has also partnered with CNN and CNN International in the creation of the CNN Freedom Project, a news-media documentary campaign initiated in 2011, aimed at exposing and confronting modern-day slavery and human trafficking issues. In total, the Kulczyk Foundation contributed in creating three short films as part of the CNN Freedom Project, confronting issues of slavery in Ghana, the Rohingya refugee crisis, and slavery in Senegal. The short films feature Dominika Kulczyk as the lead of the series, where she interviews members from each community, exposing the realities faced by them. As of February 2021, the following CNN Freedom Project documentaries have been created:

- "Troubled Waters" (2019) – Explores the fight against modern slavery in Ghana, where, according to estimates, over 20,000 kids are forced into slavery in the area of Lake Volta. The documentary shows a campaign to help children on the lake, which includes a testimony of a child dealer and a person who decided to sell their own child.
- "Stolen Son" (2019) – Highlights the situation of Rohingya refugees from Myanmar in Bangladesh. Over a million people live there in constant danger posed by the human trafficking occurring in the region. The main theme of the documentary is the story of the disappearance and search of 12-year-old child Mohamed Faisal.
- "Begging for Change" (2019) – Describes the situation of Senegalese children, mainly boys, who are students of illegal Quaranic universities. They are sent there by parents who cannot afford to support them. Instead of care and education, they face exploitation and violence in these schools. They are forced to beg on city streets by teachers. The film also shows the activities of the Maison de la Gare organization that helps abused children.
