= Mahan Coal Limited =

Coordinates: 24.062°N 82.624°E

Mahan Coal Limited is a disputed coal mine project in Singrauli district, Madhya Pradesh, India. The project has been opposed by environmentalists since it seeks to pull down 1200 acres of old sal forests for a coal mine. At least 500,000 prime sal trees would be chopped, and 54 villages with a considerable tribal population would be displaced. However, a group of villagers have also been supporting the mine since it would boost the local economy.

== Business ==
Mahan Coal Ltd is a Rs 5,000-crore joint venture between Essar Energy and the Aditya Birla Group (Hindalco).

Part of the controversy is based on claims by Greenpeace India that the sanction for the coal mine was given based on a Gram Sabha (village board) resolution that had been forged. The land was allocated to the company based on this document. However, in 2014, the coal block land was deallocated by the Supreme Court resulting in sharp drops in the company's stocks.

Its original allocation in 2006 is part of the Indian coal allocation scam. During investigations, the Ministry of Power stated that it had opposed a role for Hindalco in the mine, but the coal ministry under Manmohan Singh allocated the mine to the joint company.

=== Opposition by Greenpeace India ===
Since the BJP government came to power, the project has seen considerable support, and has been linked in the media for the Government actions against Greenpeace India.

In January 2015, Priya Pillai, a Greenpeace campaigner, who was very active in Mahan, was offloaded from a flight while she was to meet some British MPs inquiring into the matter. The issue is relevant to Britain, since Essar Power is listed in the London Stock Exchange.

In March 2015, the Ministry of Environment did not give a clearance for the project, and subsequently Ministry of Coal announced that the Mahan coal block would not be auctioned for mining, which was viewed as a victory by the tribespeople living in the villages.
