= Greenpeace India =

Indian non-governmental organisation

Greenpeace logo

Greenpeace India is the Indian branch of the global environmental group Greenpeace, a non-profit NGO, with a presence in 55 countries across Europe, the America, Asia. Greenpeace India has legally registered society in four locations with Bengaluru as its headquarters and other branches at Delhi, Chennai, Patna.

== History ==
The global organization known as Greenpeace today, came into existence in the year 1970 while Greenpeace India has been actively working on following:

- 2001 – Greenpeace, along with victim workers of Mercury Thermometer factory in Kodaikanal, forced the Hindustan Unilever to shut down the factory.
- 2001 – Greenpeace exposed the contamination of Pringles Potato Chips and Isomil Baby food with genetically engineered ingredients and questioned India's GMO free status.
- 2002 – Greenpeace ran a month-long campaign to create awareness on the potential threats of what could have become the first GE food crop in the country, resulting in the rejection of genetically modified mustard.
- 2003 – Greenpeace forces Hindustan Unilever to collect mercury waste from its shut down factory in Kodaikanal and send it to the US for recycling.
- 2004 – Bayer pulled out Genetic Engineering Research in India, clarifying its position in a letter to Greenpeace.
- 2005 – Greenpeace announced in a press conference in New Delhi, that farmers in the Narsampet mandal of Warangal district of Andhra Pradesh were cheated by over Rupees 2 crores because local officials had doctored data of Monsanto's poorly performing Bt cotton varieties. This led to an enquiry and subsequent ban on three varieties of BT Cotton, suspension of Joint Director of Agriculture (JDA) of Warangal district and state acceptance of fair compensation to farmers.
- 2006 – Greenpeace exposed a scandal surrounding the Indian Government permitting France to dump a ship full of hazardous waste in India.
- 2010 – Greenpeace through a petition campaign succeeded in including "complete supplier liability" in the Nuclear Liability Bill.
- 2014 – the organization launched its first solar energy micro-grid, making Dharnai, a village in Bihar, energy independent.
- 2015 Government of India prevented a senior Green peace activist from travelling to London.
- April 2015 – Government of India froze its bank accounts and suspended its license for failing to abide by FCRA norms
- 6 November 2015 – Registrar of Societies (RoS), of Chennai, in the state of Tamil Nadu, ordered de-registration of Greenpeace India citing financial fraud.
- 21 November 2015 – Madras high court stays cancellation of Greenpeace India's registration, observing that the Tamil Nadu Registrar of Societies (RoS) had not followed principles of natural justice.

== Funding ==
Greenpeace India stated in 2014 that it received 60% of its funding from donors in India, 38% from Netherlands-based Greenpeace International and less than 1% from the US-based ClimateWorks Foundation, as of from June 2014 the organisation does not receive any foreign funds. According to the organization, they did not accept money from governments, intergovernmental organizations, political parties or corporations in order to avoid their influence. Their core fundraising model is called "Direct Dialogue Recruitment" where the fundraising team goes out on the street directly approaching the common people to discuss the current environmental condition and how Greenpeace is working towards bringing in a positive change. These discussions eventually leads to enrolling the interested person as a donor and a volunteer.

=== Financial violations ===
In April 2015, Greenpeace was charged with several cases of financial violations under the FCRA (Foreign Contribution Regulation Act) by the Indian Government. The Indian Government had blocked all bank accounts on allegations of illegal opening and non disclosure of bank accounts to income tax authorities and financial mishandling of foreign donations. Violations also include spending more than 60% of funds for management expenses and tax evasion. According to FCRA, NGOs cannot use more than 50% of foreign funds for administrative expenses. On April 28, 2015 Indian Government froze the bank accounts of Greenpeace India and suspended its license for failing to declare details of donations from abroad under FCRA. However, the employees of Greenpeace India decided to work without salary in case funds run out.

In May 2015, the Indian High Court provided interim relief to open two of its domestic accounts to allow regular operations of the organisations but the money frozen by government was not allowed to be used pending further trial.

== Alleged anti-development activities ==
Greenpeace has been accused of obstructing development activities by Indian prime minister Narendra Modi, an accusation which was rejected by the organisation. Greenpeace India has undertaken protests against thermal power, nuclear power, coal and aluminium mining across India. Greenpeace has also been active with promoting Solar energy equipment produced by the US-based Zemlin Surface Optical Corporation, especially in Bihar. Greenpeace India has admitted to anchoring local protests against coal mines and participating in seminars where foreign funding is sought for protests, but has clarified that the source of funding does not lessen the seriousness of harm to the environment.

A report by the Indian Intelligence Bureau accused Greenpeace of posing threat to Indian economic security.

== Funding dispute ==
In June 2014, the Ministry of Home Affairs directed the Reserve Bank of India to hold foreign remittances to the organization following an Intelligence Bureau report on foreign-funded non-governmental organizations. In April 2015, the ministry suspended Greenpeace India's FCRA registration and froze its bank accounts, and in September 2015 it cancelled the registration. The Delhi High Court and the Madras High Court stayed or reversed several of the government's orders, and in November 2015 the Tamil Nadu Registrar of Societies cancelled the organization's society registration.

As of 2019, Greenpeace India continued to operate on domestic donations at about half its previous staff and scale.

== Dharnai ==
On July 20, 2014, Greenpeace India set up a 100 kW solar-based microgrid in Dharnai, Bihar costing 3 crores, that was supposed to provide 24×7 electricity to 450 homes and 50 commercial operations but never did.

The story of Dharnai also impressed Bihar CM Nitish Kumar. However, this is insignificant compared to massive initiatives by state governments of Gujarat, Rajasthan and MP which generate bulk of 3000 MW of solar power

According to Kamal Kishore, a resident of Dharnai, this helped village get over kerosene lamps and solved their energy crisis. The micro-grid is being co-operated by two other organizations BASIX and Centre for Environment and Energy Development (CEED).

India has an installed energy capacity of 211 GW while its peak energy demand is said to rise to 335 GW by the end of the 12th Five Year Plan (2012–2017), to meet this demand the government will have to install within the next four years, twice the capacity it has been able to install in the last 60 years. Samit Aich, Executive Director of Greenpeace India claimed that nuclear/thermal power plants will not be able to reach small villages like Dharnai. However the claim is disputable as in states like Gujarat every village has been reached on existing grid. Naveen Mishra of CEED has also urged the Bihar government to recognize the potential of the decentralised renewable energy systems (DRES) and replicate the Dharnai model across other dark villages of Bihar.

Many of Dharnai villagers however were unimpressed and demanded "real electricity" and connection with real grid rather than the micro-grid. Dharnai had gone off-grid in 1981 at height of Maoist violence when village transformer burnt and cables connecting to grid were stolen. One of the concerns on relying solely on solar power is reliability on "non-Sun" days where only 10–25% power is produced. While the Dharnai solar system included batteries, their capacity was limited; after about three years the batteries stopped functioning and the entire system fell into disuse. Several states in India like Gujarat, Rajasthan, MP have instead used large solar plants feeding into the common integrated grid along with nuclear and thermal power plants.

== Mahan Coal Mine Project controversy ==
The Mahan Coal Mine project is a joint venture between Hindalco Industries Ltd, India and Essar Energy Plc, of the Essar Group, an Indian multinational conglomerate partly floated on London Stock Exchange in 2010. A controversy erupted in early 2015, when the Indian Intelligence Bureau offloaded, without any stated reason, Greenpeace activist Priya Pillai from a London bound flight taking off from Delhi Airport.

Pillai told The Guardian:

I wanted to come to London to tell British MPs about what I’ve witnessed in Mahan. A community of 50,000 people has been fighting this London-based company, Essar Energy, trying to save their forest home. Essar just wants to bulldoze the forest and replace it with a coal mine.

Per Greenpeace, there are anywhere between 54–62 villages who depend on the forest for their lively hood, additionally, the Mahan forests, that the mining company plans to destroy by cutting down over 500,000 trees, houses hundreds of migratory bird species and wildlife. The project was first floated in 2006 and rejected in 2011, by the then Environment Minister who cited following reasons of his rejection: "It is an undoubtedly biodiversity rich area. It will destroy good natural forest cover and interfere with wildlife habitats". He further added that "by the companies’ own admission, the coal mined from this area will only last for the next 14 years and therefore he does not find the proposal reasonable".

The environment minister was relieved from his job shortly afterwards and in February 2014, the project later received a green signal from government, under the new minister M. Veerappa Moily—who belonged to the Congress govt, as the center was still ruled by PM Manmohan Singh and Cong Party President Sonia Gandhi, following which Greenpeace activists staged a protest that resulted in Essar Group suing 'Greenpeace India' and the villagers of Mahan Sangarsh Samiti for 500 crores.

P. R. Sanjai wrote: "The clearance by MoEF comes barely three weeks after environment activist group Greenpeace India rolled down a huge poster that read "I Kill Forests: Essar" on the facade of Essar's headquarters in Mumbai. The banner also featured pictures of Prime Minister Manmohan Singh and environment minister M. Veerappa Moily. The protest was related to Essar Power's plans to start mining at Mahan in Madhya Pradesh—one of the oldest deciduous-forest regions of India".

Pillai was barred from travelling out of India because of Indian Government's concern of her testifying against India in foreign sovereign Parliament where Indian Governments counter view would not be heard. According to Government of India, such hearings are tilted and used as instruments of foreign policy-unlike UN committees where each country is allowed its say.

== See also ==
- Greenpeace
- Kodaikanal mercury poisoning
- 2006 Ivory Coast toxic waste dump
- Essar Energy
