= CEED =

CEED or Ceed may refer to:

- Central and Eastern Europe Development Institute, a development institute
- Common Entrance Examination for Design, a joint entrance exam for post-graduate studies in India
- Kia Ceed, a 2006–present South Korean compact car for the European market
