= Ufficio Primo =

Historic office building in Warsaw, Poland

Coordinates: 52°13′36″N 21°00′33″E

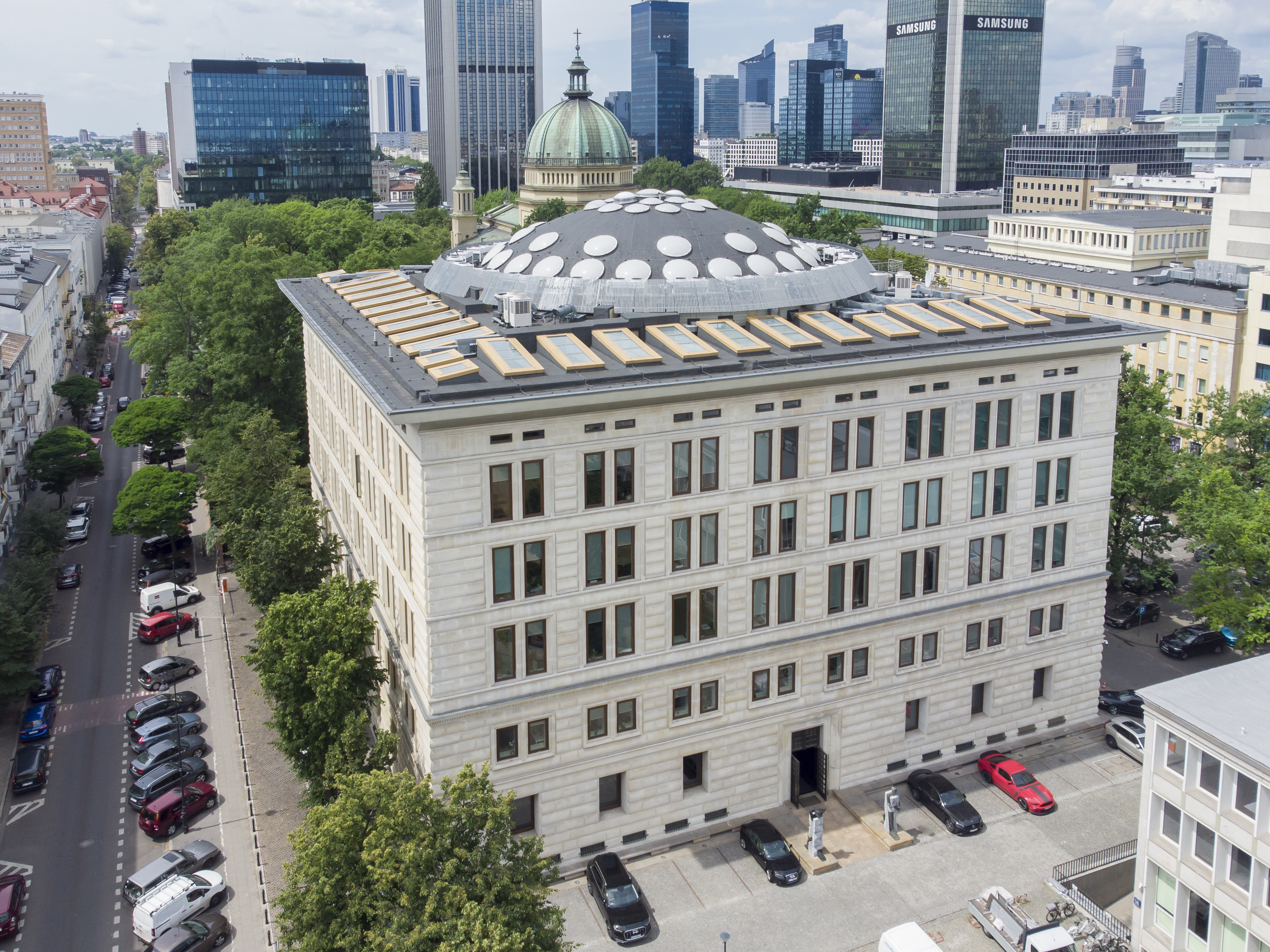
- View of the building from the south-east, along Wspólna Street. Skylights on the roof are visible
- Interactive map of the Ufficio Primo area
- Former names: Presidium of the Government Office Building

General information
- Type: Office building
- Architectural style: Modern historicism
- Location: 62 Wspólna Street, Warsaw, Poland
- Completed: 1952
- Renovated: 2012
- Owner: Euro Invest

Technical details
- Floor count: 6
- Floor area: approx. 6,000 m^{2} (65,000 sq ft)

Design and construction
- Architect: Marek Leykam

Website
- ufficioprimo.pl

Ufficio Primo, formerly Presidium of the Government Office Building, is a historic office building located at 62 Wspólna Street in Warsaw. It represents modern historicism and refers to the Italian Renaissance.

== History ==
The building was designed by architect Marek Leykam, with structural engineering by J. Dowgiałło. The design was showcased at an exhibition in the Zachęta gallery in 1950. It was intended to be part of a planned ministerial district, as a "palace of power". Visually, it was designed to connect with the former Warszawa Główna railway station (later Warszawa Śródmieście).

Completed around 1952, the building served as the headquarters for the Presidium of the Government under Bolesław Bierut. However, it fulfilled this role for only a few sessions until 1953. Subsequently, it housed design offices for the automotive and defense industries, as well as the headquarters of various industrial associations, including the Chemak Chemical Equipment Manufacturing Association.

From 1990, the building was managed by Fabryka Samochodów Osobowych, and later by Euro Invest, part of the Kulczyk Holding group.

Between 1993 and 2008, the building's basement housed the Ground Zero music club, which hosted performances by artists such as U2, Eiffel 65, and Bob Geldof. Prior to that, the same space was occupied by the Barbara Cinema, established after 1956.

In 2003, the building was included on the Association of Polish Architects' list of contemporary cultural assets in Warsaw from between 1945 and 1989 for meeting all evaluated criteria. Since July 2012, it has been listed in Warsaw's municipal register of cultural heritage (ID: SRO10857), and in 2015, it was added to the Registry of Cultural Property of the Masovian Voivodeship (register no. A-1290, dated 19 March 2015).

Between 2010 and 2012, the building underwent a major renovation to achieve an A+ standard. The renovation included the restoration of cloisters, columns, and oak doors, resulting in a total leasable area, including a conference hall, of over 6,000 m². The renovation cost exceeded 15 million euro. Ufficio Primo received the third prize in the first edition (covering 2001–2014) of the Architectural Award of the President of Warsaw in the "revitalized architecture" category. The awarded architectural teams were O&O (Wiesław Olko, Artur Nurczewski, Łukasz Engel, Łukasz Kwietniewski, Grzegorz Bajorek) and Pracownia B'ART (Bartłomiej Biełyszew, Andrzej Skopiński, Arkadiusz Chrulski, Monika Szydłowska). The building's new commercial name references the Uffizi gallery in Florence.

In 2015, four sculptures titled Strażnicy (Guardians) by Barbara Falender, depicting Tyche, Hermes, Fortuna, and Mercury, were placed at the building's entrances. That same year, Ciech S.A., a company listed on the Warsaw Stock Exchange, relocated its headquarters to Ufficio Primo.

== Architecture ==
The building has six above-ground floors and two underground levels. Constructed on a square plan, it resembles a cube. The facade is nearly identical on all sides. Inside, a spacious rotunda spans the building's full height, featuring long galleries with columns encircling it. On the top two floors, the columns are double-height. The rotunda is capped by a flat, concrete dome with circular skylights. The basement includes a conference hall designed for 400 people, with a semicircular vault featuring concentric, reinforced concrete ribs converging at a cylindrical chandelier. The interior of this hall resembles that of the Centennial Hall in Wrocław. Office spaces have ceilings exceeding 3.5 meters in height. Windows are narrow and paired, adorned with bossage, particularly at the base. Circular stairwells with central voids occupy the building's corners. The structure is topped with a classical cornice. The main entrance was planned from Jan Pankiewicz Street.

The basement includes a nuclear fallout shelter. According to some sources, materials from demolished post-German structures in Lower Silesia were used in its construction, and the skylights allegedly came from Adolf Hitler's bunker.

The architectural style blends influences from various periods. It reflects a compromise between Socialist realism and national architecture, incorporating Western European elements. The monumental form draws inspiration from Florence's urban palaces of the Quattrocento period in the 15th century. The colonnade references Romanesque columns from the St. Leonard's Crypt at Wawel Cathedral. The galleried cloisters may be inspired by those at the Wawel Castle. The building's style, unique during the Socialist realism era, is characterized as modern historicism.

Contemporary critics labeled the building a "cosmopolitan deviation". In the 21st century, its form has been described as "remarkable", "outstanding and unique", and "historically and culturally multifaceted". The architecture may represent an attempt to challenge and satirize socialist realist aesthetics, which sought historical references without specific temporal anchors. This resulted in an aesthetic tied to the West and banking, possibly exposing the "megalomania of the client". In 2012, the building was added to Warsaw's municipal register of cultural heritage (ID: SRO10857), and in 2015, it was designated a protected monument (register no. A-1290, dated 19 March 2015).

== Gallery ==
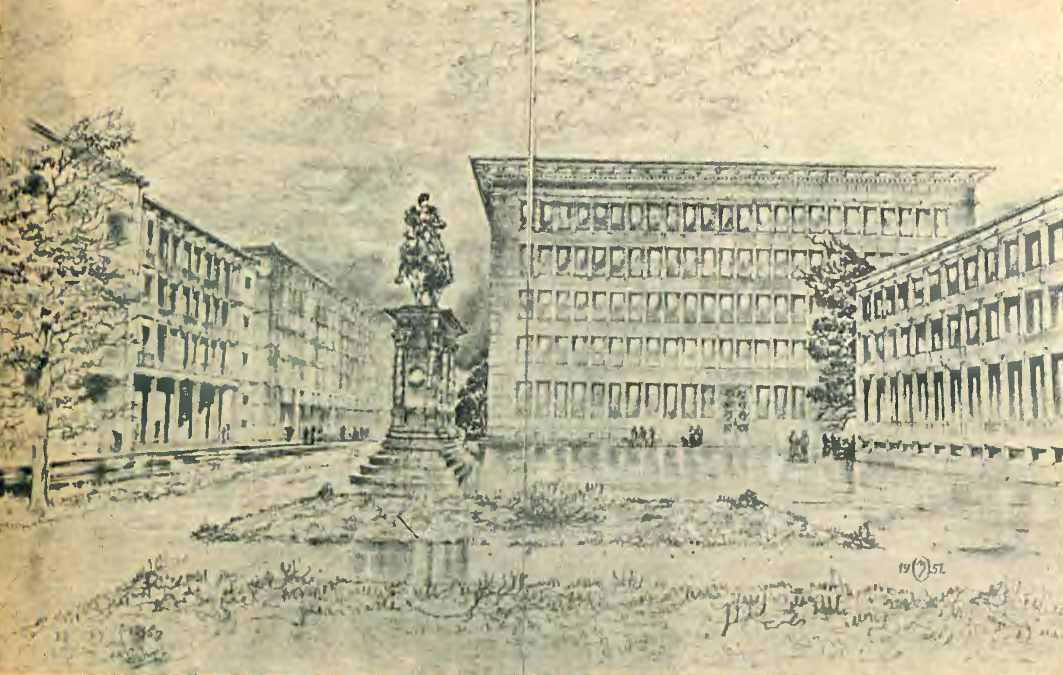
Visualization of the building's design published in Stolica in 1951

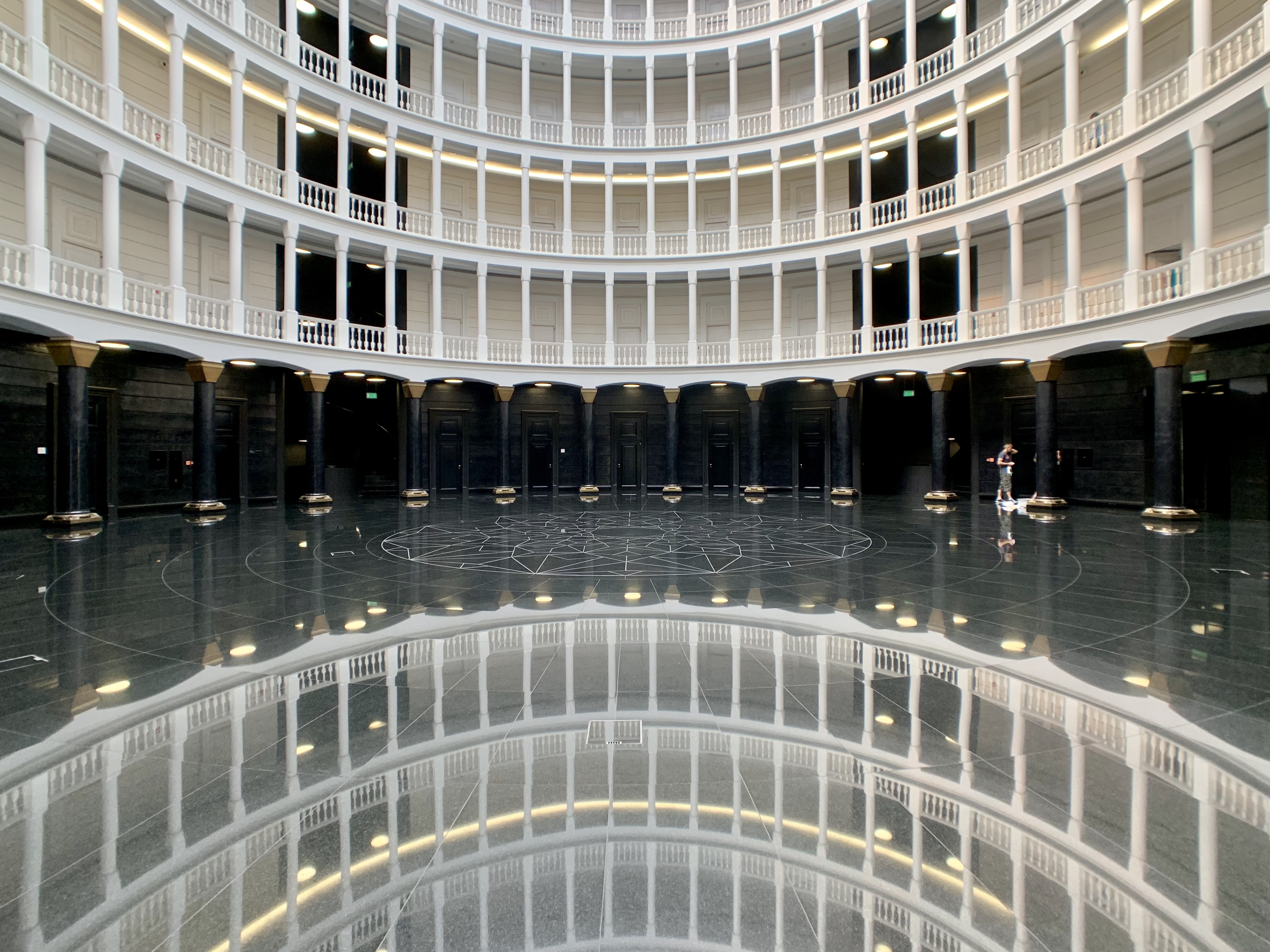
Internal circular patio with its characteristic colonnade

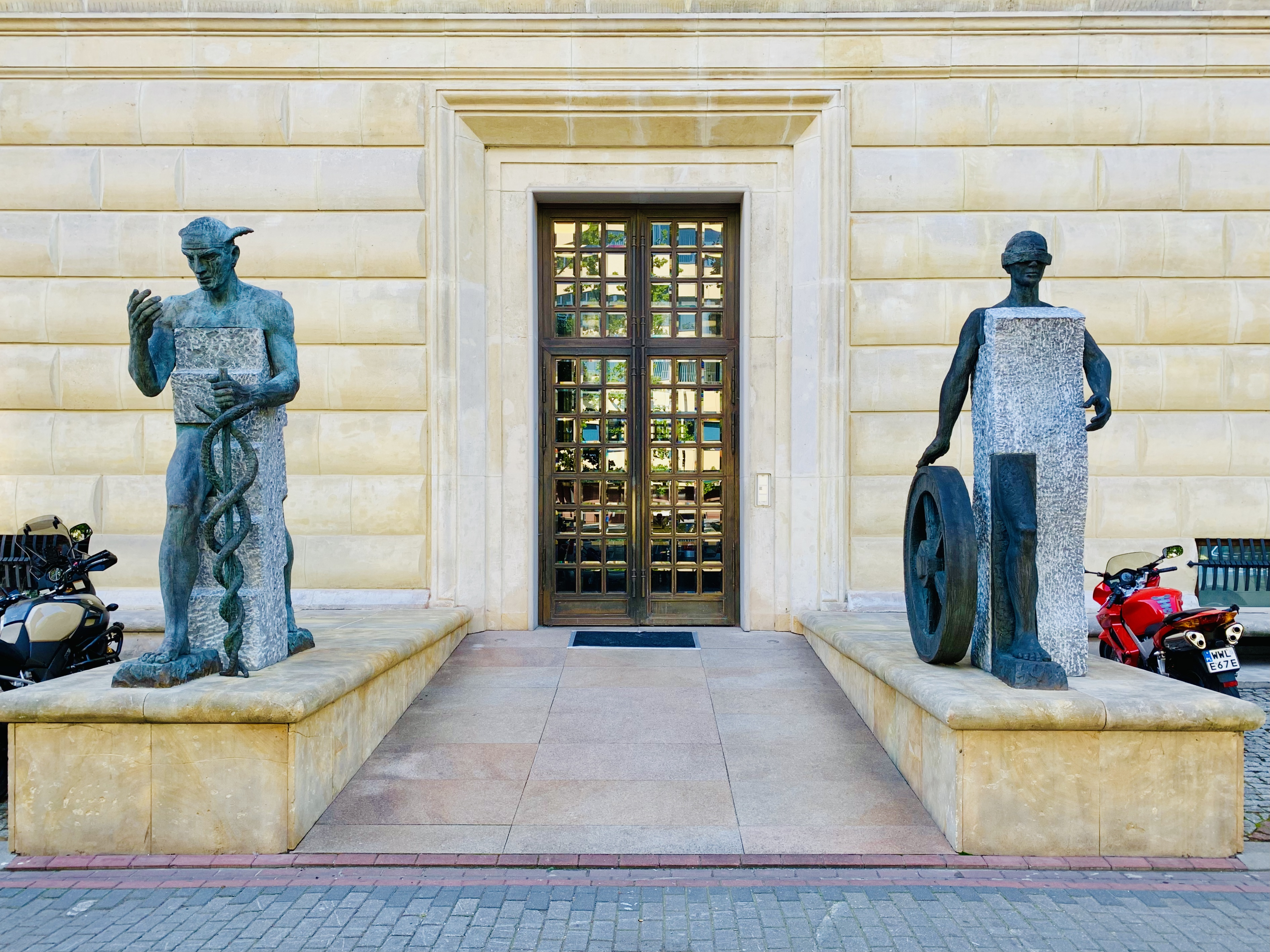
Sculptures at the northern entrance, installed in 2015
