= Dariusz Mioduski =

Polish entrepreneur and President of Legia Warsaw

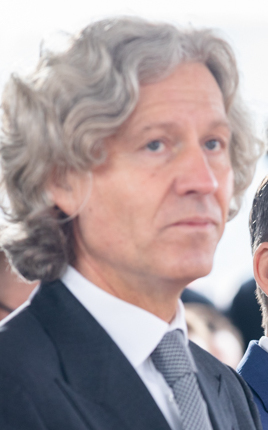
- Mioduski in 2019
- Born: 1 January 1964 (age 62); Chełmno, Poland
- Education: University of St. Thomas, Harvard University
- Occupations: Lawyer, Owner and Sports Director
- Title: Owner and President of Legia Warsaw

Dariusz Mioduski (Polish: [ˈdarjuʂ mjɔˈduskʲi]; born 1 January 1964) is a Polish lawyer, entrepreneur, and sports director.

Mioduski is the owner and president of Legia Warsaw, CEO of Radwan Investments, and Executive Board member since 2015 and vice-president of European Club Association. In 2023, he became one of five ECA members of the UEFA Club Competitions company set up by UEFA and the ECA to manage the business aspects of the UEFA club competitions.

== Life and career ==
At the age of 17, he emigrated with his parents to the USA. In 1987, he received a Bachelor of Arts degree from the University of St. Thomas in Houston, and in 1990 a Juris Doctor degree from Harvard Law School. From 1990 to 1997, he served as a partner with White & Case and Vinson & Elkins in New York, Houston and Warsaw. He then served as a partner at CMS Cameron McKenna in London until 2007. In the years 2007–2013 he was the president of the Kulczyk Investments group.

In July 2012, he joined the supervisory board of Legia Warsaw football club. Five months later, Bogusław Leśnodorski became the club's president. In January 2014, he and Leśnodorski became the owners of Legia Warsaw, buying 100 per cent of the company's shares from the ITI Group. Mioduski became the majority shareholder (80 percent). In time, 20 per cent from Mioduski was taken over by Maciej Wandzel. On 22 March 2017, he purchased the remaining forty percent of the club to become the single owner of the club from Bogusław Leśnodorski.

In 2015, he was awarded the Gold Cross of Merit by President of Poland Bronisław Komorowski.

=== AZ Alkmaar controversy ===
On the night of 5-6 October 2023, after the end of the Europa Conference League match between AZ Alkmaar and Legia Warsaw, there was a clash between Legia players and staff on one side, and AZ Alkmaar security and Dutch police on the other. A video was published online showing Dariusz Mioduski being pushed and beaten by Dutch police. As a result of the incident, two Legia players Josué Pesqueira and Radovan Pankov were arrested. They were released the next day, Josué was not charged. During a press conference on 6 October, Dariusz Mioduski called the incidents in the Netherlands "an absolute scandal," accused the Dutch media of propagating an untrue narrative and announced efforts to clarify the entire situation. On 15 December, UEFA charged AZ with a €40,000 fine for failing to provide security for the Polish side at the AZ Stadium.

== Media ==
Mioduski was involved in the Amazon Prime Video sports docuseries Legia. Do końca, which documented the club by spending time with the coaching staff and players behind the scenes both on and off the field throughout their 2022–23 season.

== Trophies won by club during presidency ==
=== Football ===
Legia:

- Ekstraklasa: 2017–18, 2019–20, 2020–21
- Polish Cup: 2017–18, 2022–23, 2024–25
- Polish Super Cup: 2025
