= Dharnai, Bihar =

Village in India

Coordinates: 25.011°N 84.976°E

Dharnai is a small village located in the district of Makhdumpur, Jehanabad in the Indian state of Bihar. It is located approximate 73 km from the state capital Patna. The postal code is 804422.

It is very close to the Patna-Gaya National Highway 22. The longitude 84.9791534999999 and latitude 25.0125063 are the geo-coordinate of the Dharnai.

== Greenpeace Dharnai solar project ==
In 2015 Greenpeace funded a project to make Dharnai India's first village powered entirely by solar energy, but little more than a year later villagers demanded and got electricity from the regular grid due to the low power availability and high cost of the solar system (which they called "fake energy").

== Demographics ==
As per the Census of 2011, Dharnai had population of 3207. Out of the total population of 3207, 1651 were males and 1556 were females. The total population of children had 534 in the age bracket of 0–6 years in which 257 were girls and 277 were boys.

== Natives ==
The people of Dharnai mostly speak Hindi & English. The natives here mostly used these two languages to communicate.

== Nearby villages ==
The surrounding villages to Dharnai are Umta, Pali, Berka, Railly, Chatiyana, Khaneta, Bela, Makhdumpur Rampur, Mananpur

== Transport ==
The nearest airport to Dharnai is Gaya which located at the distance of 23.0 km whereas Barabar railway station at the distance of 0.1 km.
