= 2015 Priya Pillai offloading =

The Priya Pillai offloading of January 2015 was an incident in India where an environmental activist was offloaded from a flight in order to prevent her from testifying internationally on the activity of a firm registered in the UK.

Later, the Ministry of Home Affairs (India) argued that her deposition before a British parliamentary committee would have been "prejudicial to national interest" In its judgment, the Delhi High Court observed that dissent "may not be palatable; even so, it cannot be muzzled."

The incident has been widely discussed in India as evidence suggesting a possible trend towards eroding Freedom of expression in India under the Bharatiya Janata Party government. International media has also been critical of the Narendra Modi Government.

== Background ==
The government was interested in promoting coal energy, and in the work of the Mahan Coal Limited, a joint venture of the UK-registered firm Essar Energy with Hindalco, to mine coal in an old sal forest area in Madhya Pradesh. Priya Pillai, who works with Greenpeace India, had been campaigning actively in Mahan for several years.

In January 2015, she was to testify before the British All-Party Parliamentary Group for Tribal Peoples chaired by Martin Horwood, which was looking at the role of Essar Power. At the airport on 11 January, immigration officials offloaded her from the flight, but no reason was given to her for this act.

Pillai wrote twice to the Secretary, Ministry of Home Affairs wishing to know the legal basis for the offloading, but received no reply. She then took the matter to Delhi High Court, with her lawyer Indira Jaising arguing that there had been a "simultaneous violation of the right to free speech, right to freedom of association and personal liberty of movement."

In an Intelligence Bureau report addressed to the Prime Minister's Office from June 2014, Greenpeace's activities were claimed to be causing negative impact on the country's economic development. In September 2014, a British greenpeace activist was deported from India despite having a valid visa. The MEA states that having a valid visa does not guarantee entry or permission to stay in the country. This policy is on par with the current international policy and that of every recognised country in the world.

=== The Government's Justification ===
The Ministry of Home Affairs was given a week to respond, but sought several extensions. Eventually, the Ministry filed an affidavit stating that the action was based on a look-out circular issued the day before her flight, at the request of the Intelligence Bureau.

The reason given was that Pillai "would project the image of Indian Government 'negatively' at the international level." The government claimed that "in-person testimony of local activists" dealing with sensitive subjects such as "religious freedom, tribal people, indigenous people, violence against women, human trafficking and dalit rights" damaged the country's reputation. This was particularly problematic since India was at least two decades behind the west in the energy sector. A "negative image" of India would "whittle down foreign direct investments”, and it was claimed that she was involved in "anti-national activities". At the same time, since the LOC is a "secret" document, it could not be shown to her.

At one point, the Assistant Attorney General Sanjay Jain told the court:

If there is an undertaking that she will not make this speech before the MPs, then the LOC will be withdrawn. There is no general curtailment of her movement.

To this remark, Pillai said that she refused to

accept any such gag offer. I was exercising my fundamental right... If I accept that the government has a right to dictate what I can and can’t say, then India and all Indians would lose something priceless – our absolute right to free speech. I cannot and will not accept that.

Justice Shakdher wanted to know why the government had singled out an individual citizen. "The Indian state is not powerless. You have a plethora of trained diplomats doing a commendable job of protecting national interests. I don’t see how the state cannot meet the challenge posed."

== Judgment ==
In February, the Delhi High court expunged the ban on travel for Pillai, In his judgement, justice Rajiv Shakdher observed:

The point in issue is, why must the State interfere with the freedom of an individual, as long as the individual concerned operates within the ambit of laws framed by the legislature.

The core aspect of democracy is the freedom of an individual... The individual should be able to order his or her life any way he or she pleases, as long as it is not violative of the law... Amongst the varied freedoms conferred on an individual (i.e., the citizen), is the right of free speech and expression, which necessarily includes the right to criticise and dissent. Criticism, by an individual, may not be palatable; even so, it cannot be muzzled.

Many civil right activists believe that they have the right, as citizens, to bring to the notice of the State the incongruity in the developmental policies of the State. The State may not accept the views of the civil right activists, but that by itself, cannot be a good enough reason to do away with dissent.

Therefore... there was no basis for the respondents to issue an LOC qua the petitioner. That being so, the decision taken to detain the petitioner at the airport on 11.01.2015, in my opinion, was illegal being violative of the Ms Pillai's right under Article 21 and 19(1)(a) of the Constitution.

While the judgment states that the process by which Look-Out Circulars (LOC) are issued is not "enacted law", it did not strike it down.

=== Media Speculation on reasons ===
What was surprising about the incident that it was issued despite many earlier instances where the courts had clearly stated that the right to issue LOC must be exercised with caution. In 2010, Justice S Muralidhar of the Delhi high court stated that "The power to suspend, even temporarily, a passport of a citizen, the power to issue an LOC, the power to offload a passenger and prevent him or her from travelling are all extraordinary powers, vested in the criminal law enforcement agencies by the statutory law. These are powers that are required under the law, to be exercised with caution and only by the authorities who are empowered by law to do so and then again only for valid reasons."

Thus, there was much media discussion regarding the motives for the action. It was seen as a continuation of harassment to activists involved in the Mahan Coal area.

=== Accusation of totalitarian tendencies ===
However, a broader issue was whether India was moving towards more restrictive views on personal liberty and freedom of speech, as in totalitarian regimes such as China. Former Attorney General Indira Jaysing said that "The government, it seems is misreading the mandate in the Lok Sabha as being a mandate to crush dissent." An editorial in the Statesman called it "another attempt at Fascist-authoritarianism". A columnist in Firstpost saw a broader tendency:

Unfortunately, it’s not a benign mistake by the intelligence officials or the home ministry, but the reflection of a tendency of authoritarianism. There are already reports that the government is getting ready to crack down on several civil society organisations and reportedly, there is even a "hit-list". It’s certainly part of a bigger plan.

In a column in The Guardian, Aditya Chakrabortty remarked on lack of action from the Prime Minister in such incidents:

An environmentalist invited by British MPs to testify on abuse by mining firms was yanked from her London flight just before take-off. Just as with the Gujarat pogrom, the prime minister has no direct part to play in any of this – rather he fosters the environment that makes it all possible.
