= Greenpeace India foreign funding dispute =

Funding dispute between Greenpeace and India

The Greenpeace India foreign funding dispute was a series of actions taken by the Government of India against Greenpeace India between 2014 and 2019 under the Foreign Contribution (Regulation) Act, 2010, and the litigation that followed. In June 2014, the Ministry of Home Affairs directed the Reserve Bank of India to hold foreign remittances to the organization following an Intelligence Bureau report on foreign-funded non-governmental organizations. In April 2015, the ministry suspended Greenpeace India's FCRA registration and froze its bank accounts, and in September 2015 it cancelled the registration. The Delhi High Court and the Madras High Court stayed or reversed several of the government's orders, and in November 2015 the Tamil Nadu Registrar of Societies cancelled the organization's society registration.

== Background ==
Greenpeace India is registered as a society in Tamil Nadu and held registration under the Foreign Contribution (Regulation) Act, 2010. Registration allowed for it to receive foreign donations, with about 30 percent of its income coming from international donors. In June 2014, an Intelligence Bureau report on foreign-funded non-governmental organizations was submitted to the Prime Minister's Office. It named Greenpeace among more than twenty organizations and stated that their activities had reduced national GDP by 2 to 3 percent. That report was leaked to the media. A second Intelligence Bureau report dealing only with Greenpeace India was submitted a few weeks later. It alleged collusion with the organization's foreign funders and recommended that its permission to receive foreign funds be cancelled.

== History ==
In April 2015, Greenpeace India's FCRA registration was suspended for 180 days and its bank accounts frozen. The Indian government stated that an audit had found unreported transactions by Greenpeace. This included opening five accounts to receive foreign funds without disclosing them to the government, while merging foreign and domestic contributions. On May 27, 2015, the Delhi High Court allowed Greenpeace India to use two domestic accounts for its day-to-day functioning. In June 2015, the Tamil Nadu Registrar of Societies inspected the organization's Chennai office and issued a notice asking why its society registration should not be cancelled.

In September, 2015, the ministry cancelled Greenpeace India's FCRA registration on nine grounds, including under-reporting of foreign contributions. Greenpeace petitioned the Madras High Court, stating that the ministry had not furnished the evidence behind the grounds. The court granted an eight-week interim stay of the cancellation.

In November 2015, the Tamil Nadu Registrar of Societies cancelled Greenpeace India's society registration.

In August 2016, the ministry granted Greenpeace India a renewal certificate under the FCRA valid for five years. The renewal was cancelled several months later in a suo motu revision. The Madras High Court stayed the cancellation. In April 2023, the court recorded in the 2015 petition that the registration had been renewed from November 2016 and that the cancellation of the renewal remained stayed.

As of 2019, Greenpeace India continued to operate on domestic donations at about half its previous staff and scale.
