= Domino Effect (TV series) =

Polish documentary series

- Created by: Dominika Kulczyk
- Presented by: Dominika Kulczyk
- Country of origin: Poland
- No. of series: 8
- No. of episodes: 62

Production
- Running time: 25 minutes

Original release
- Network: TVN
- Release: 2 March 2014 – 2 May 2021

Efekt Domina or Domino Effect is a Polish documentary series produced by TVN and Kulczyk Foundation since 2014. Its author Dominika Kulczyk reaches places affected by poverty, natural disasters and various social problems, offering support to organizations working for local communities. Through the stories presented in the series, Dominika Kulczyk presents examples of activities based on development assistance, partnership and volunteering.

The program has been broadcast every spring since 2014 on Sundays at 11:00 am (1st-6th season) and at 11:30 am (since 7th season) in TVN station.
