= Stary Browar =

Polish commerce and art center

Coordinates: 52.402°N 16.928°E

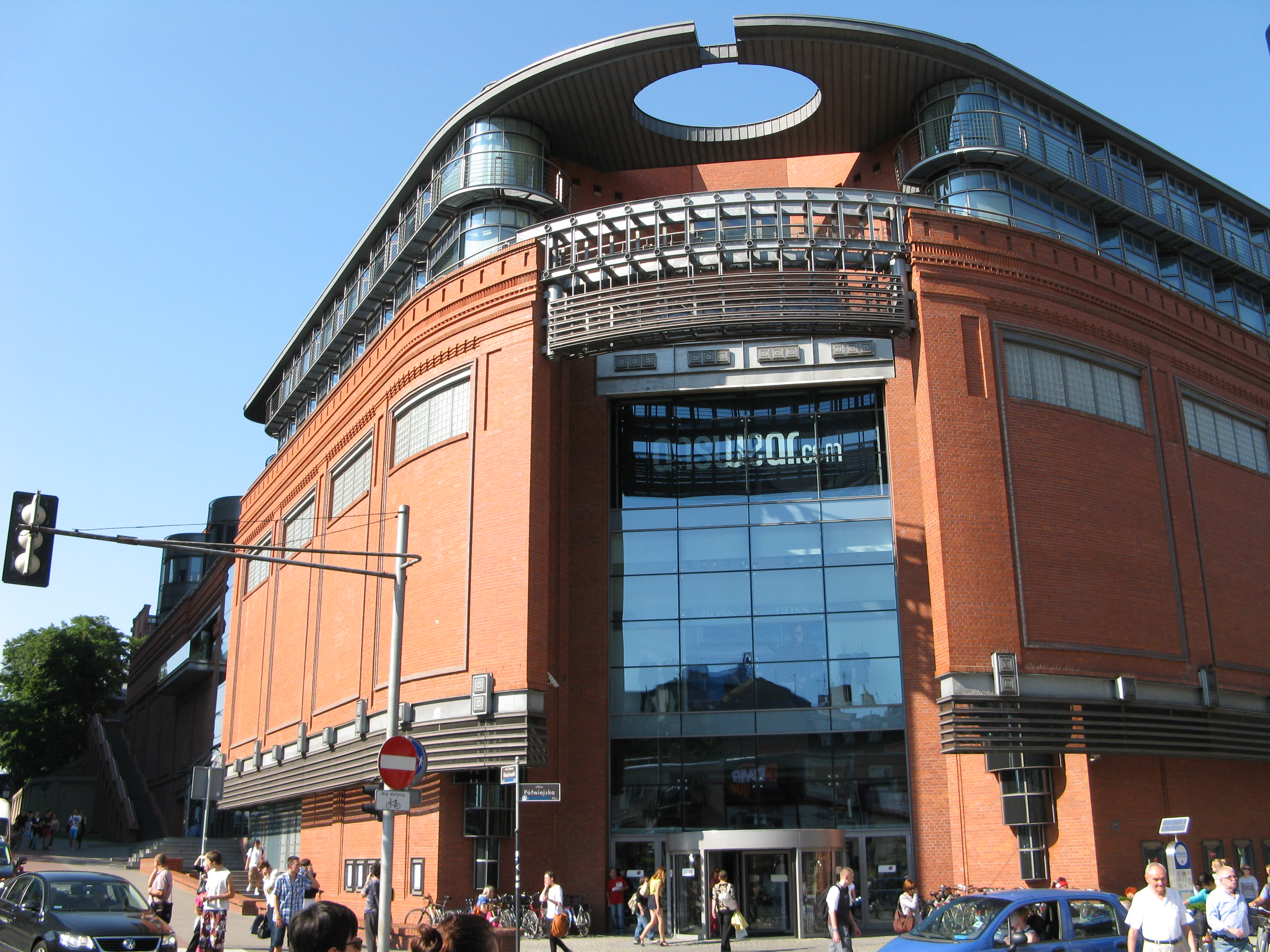
Stary Browar

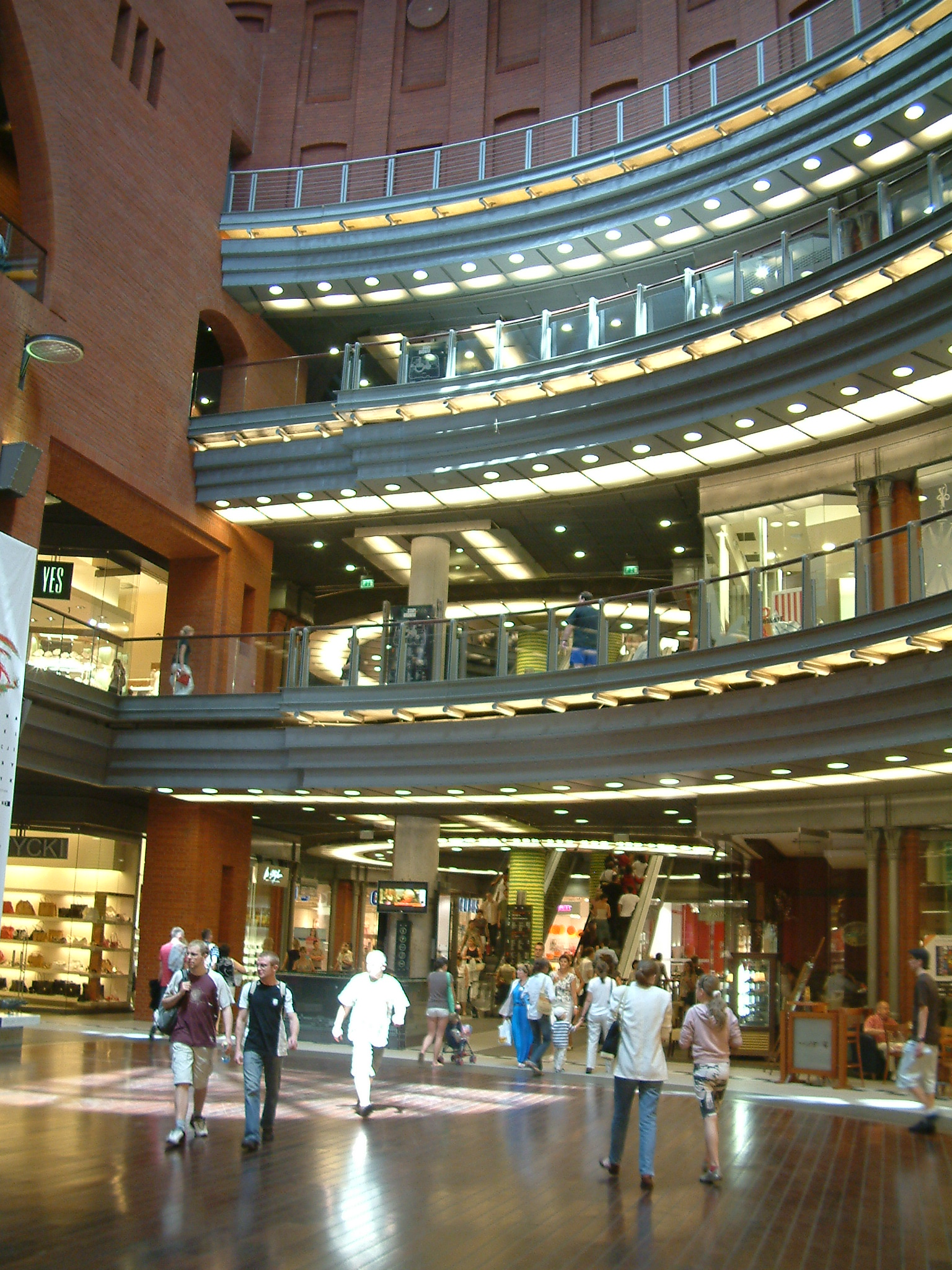
Stary Browar Interior

Stary Browar Shopping, Arts and Business Center is a commerce and art center, opened in November 2003, located in the center of Poznań, Poland at 42 Półwiejska Street. The center is a combination of retail space and an art gallery. The shopping center is adjacent to a Class A high-rise office complex. The total area of the center is around 130 000 m^{2}. The Old Brewery is home to around 210 stores and restaurants. Underground the building there is a Tier III data center operated by Beyond.pl. The building was designed on the basis of a historic factory - the former Brewery Huggerów - by Studio ADS. The investor was Fortis, a company owned by Grażyna Kulczyk. Since 2015 it belongs to Deutsche Asset & Wealth Management, which current name is Deutsche Asset Management. The décor was designed by stage designer Ryszard Kaja. It is notable for preserving the original architecture and style.

== History ==
Grażyna Kulczyk's effort to build the Museum of Contemporary and Performance Arts at Stary Browar was rejected.

== Awards ==
- 2003 Gold Pencil in Architecture presented by Radio Merkury and Voice of Wielkopolska.
- International Council of Shopping Centers Best Shopping Center in the World in the medium-sized commercial buildings category. Prize awarded on 9 December 2005 during a gala celebration in Phoenix in Arizona.
- International Council of Shopping Centers award for the best shopping center in Europe in the category of medium-sized commercial buildings.

== Expansion of the Old Brewery ==
The new wing of the Old Brewery, similar size to the already existing portion opened March 11, 2007. The new wing has six storeys including three underground levels. A parking lot for 1200 cars was built under the building. The courtyard between the two parts of the Old Brewery was enclosed, so that is also used in the winter.

== Controversy ==
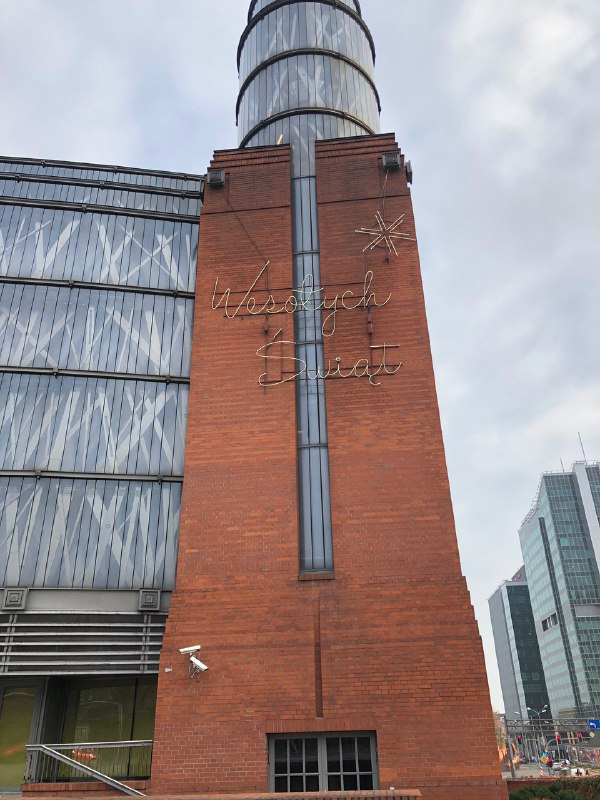
Decoration for Christmas

In March 2008 the district court found the Mayor of Poznań Ryszard Grobelny guilty of causing the city budget to lose over PLN 7 million as a result of the sale of the Old Brewery property. According to the Public Prosecutor's Office the site was worth more than PLN 13 million. Officials subject to the President sold the parcel of land as a park without registering it as a shopping center development. A sentence has been waived by the Court of Appeal on November 27, 2008. Tadeusz Dziuba, Wielkopolska governor, argued that the new wing of the Old Brewery was built in breach of contract.

== Gallery ==
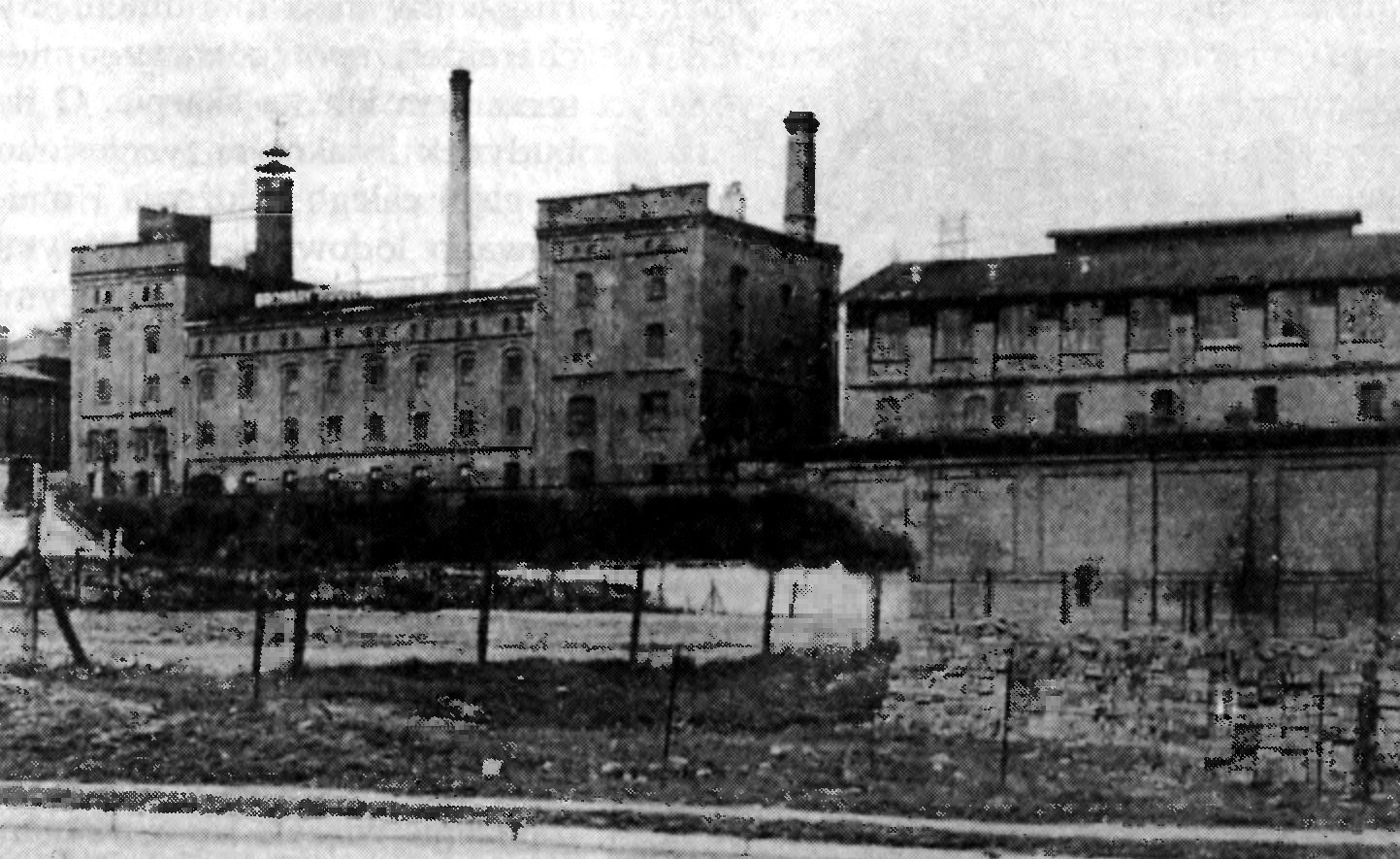
Hugger Brewery dating back to 1876 in 1930

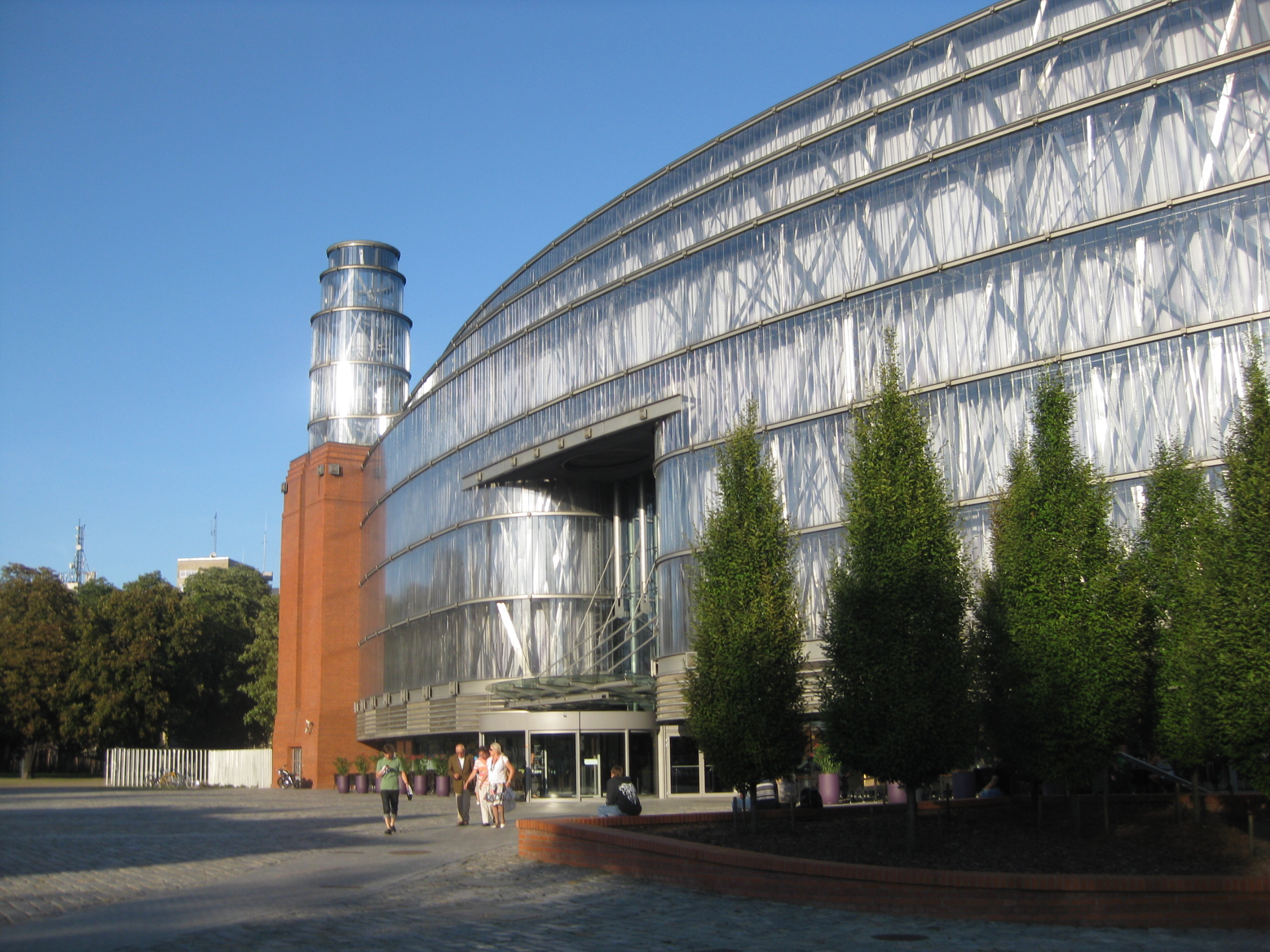
New wing of the Stary Browar

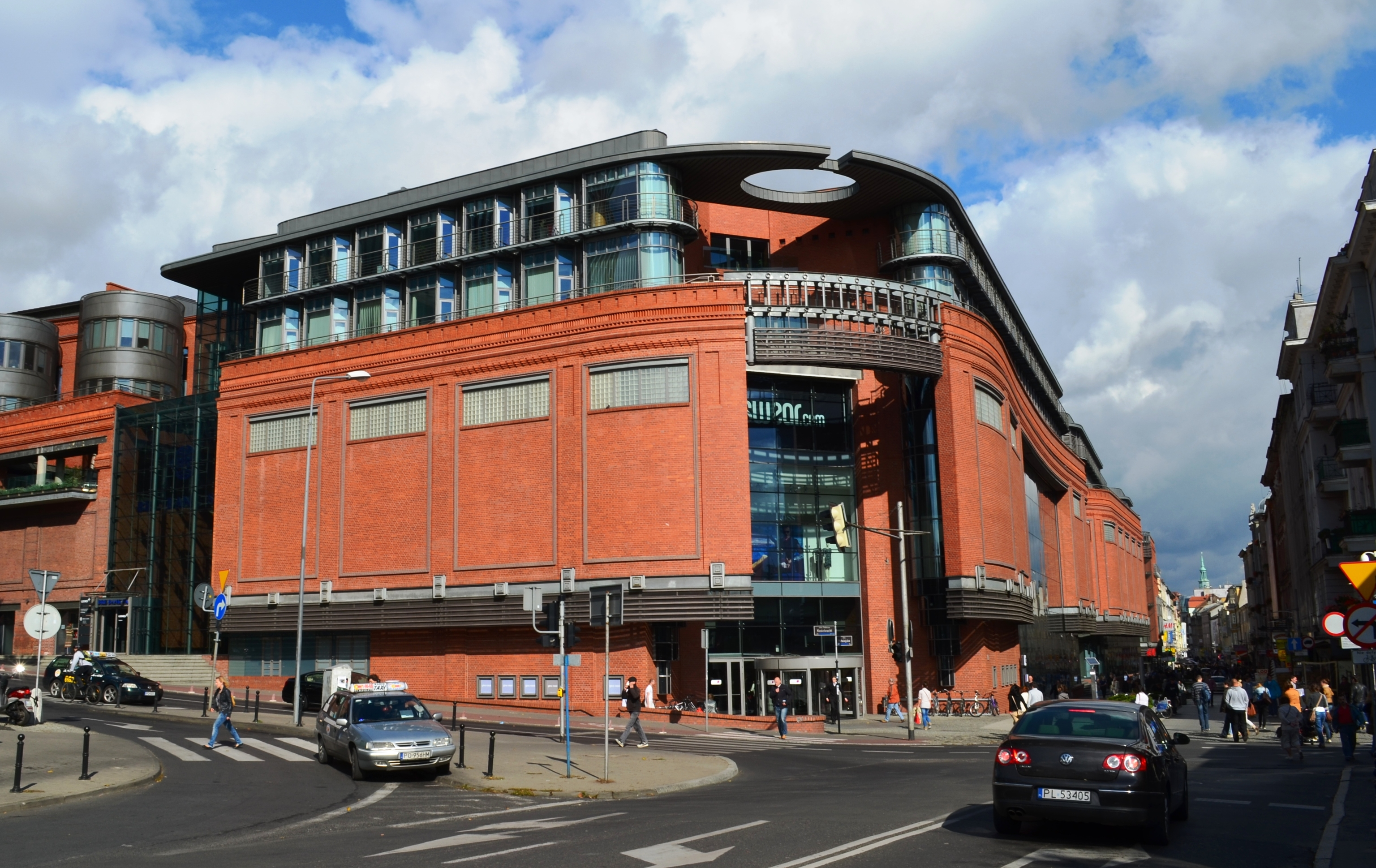
Main entrance to the Stary Browar

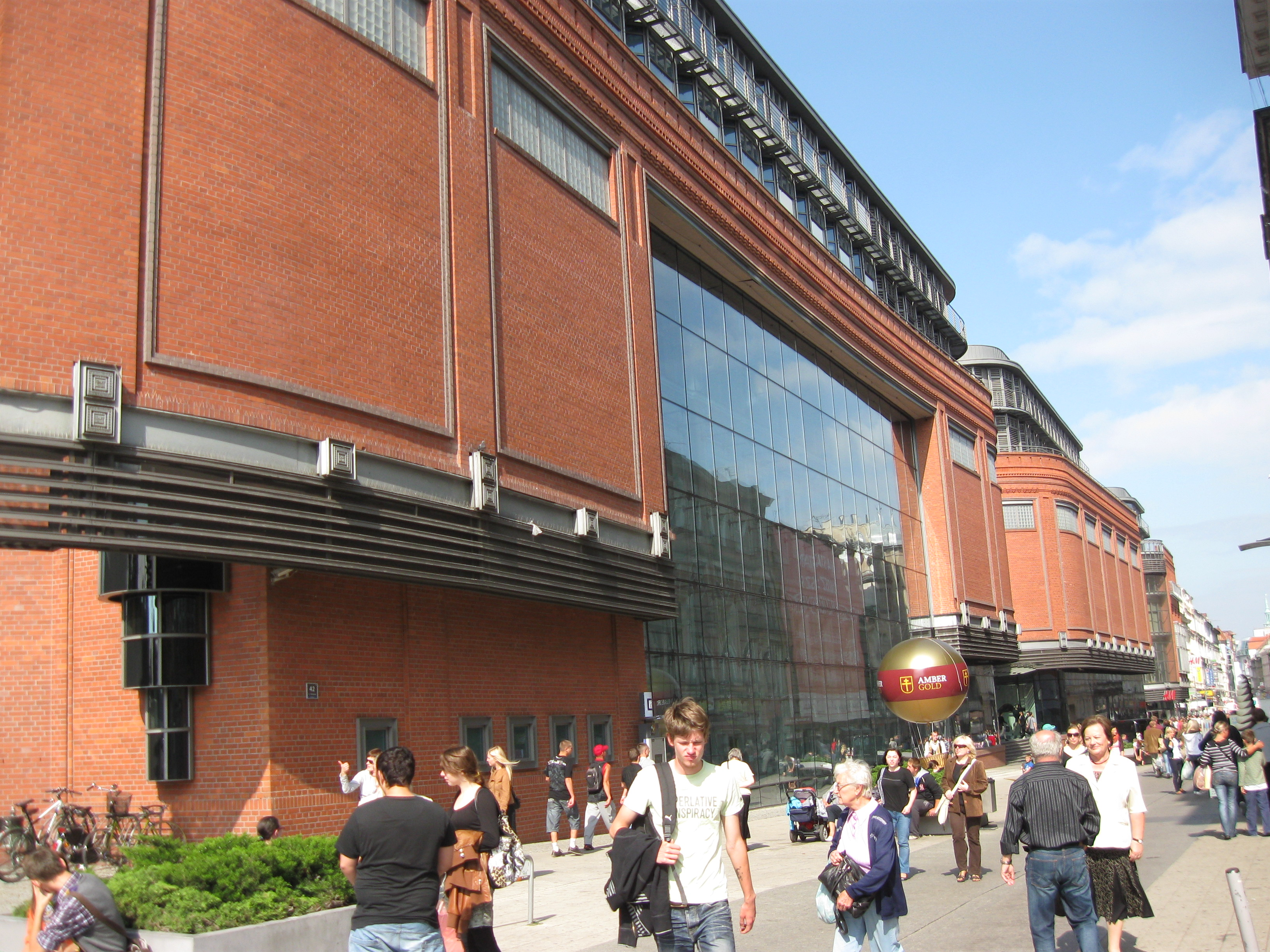
The Stary Browar from Półwiejska Street

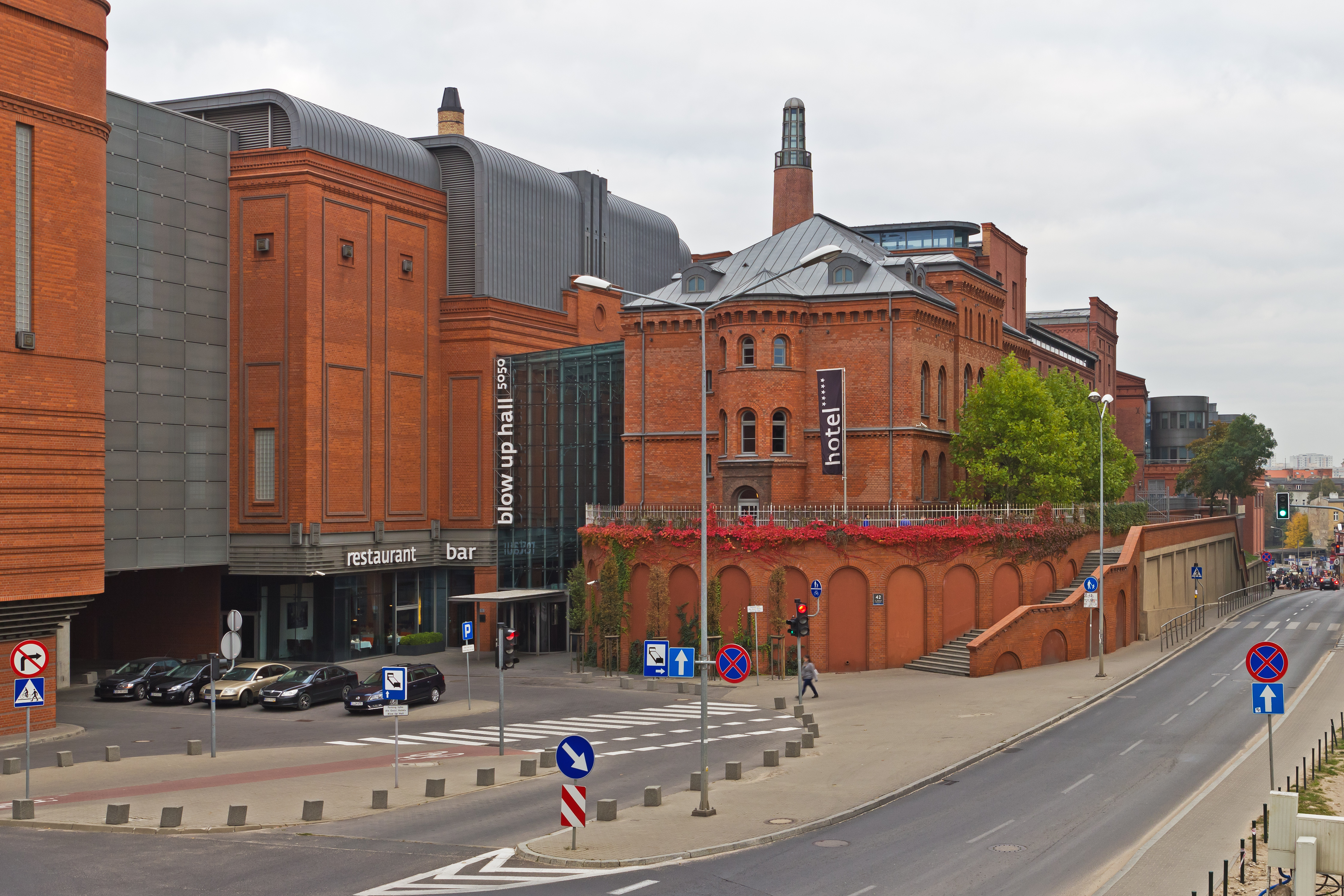
Stary Browar, view from the south

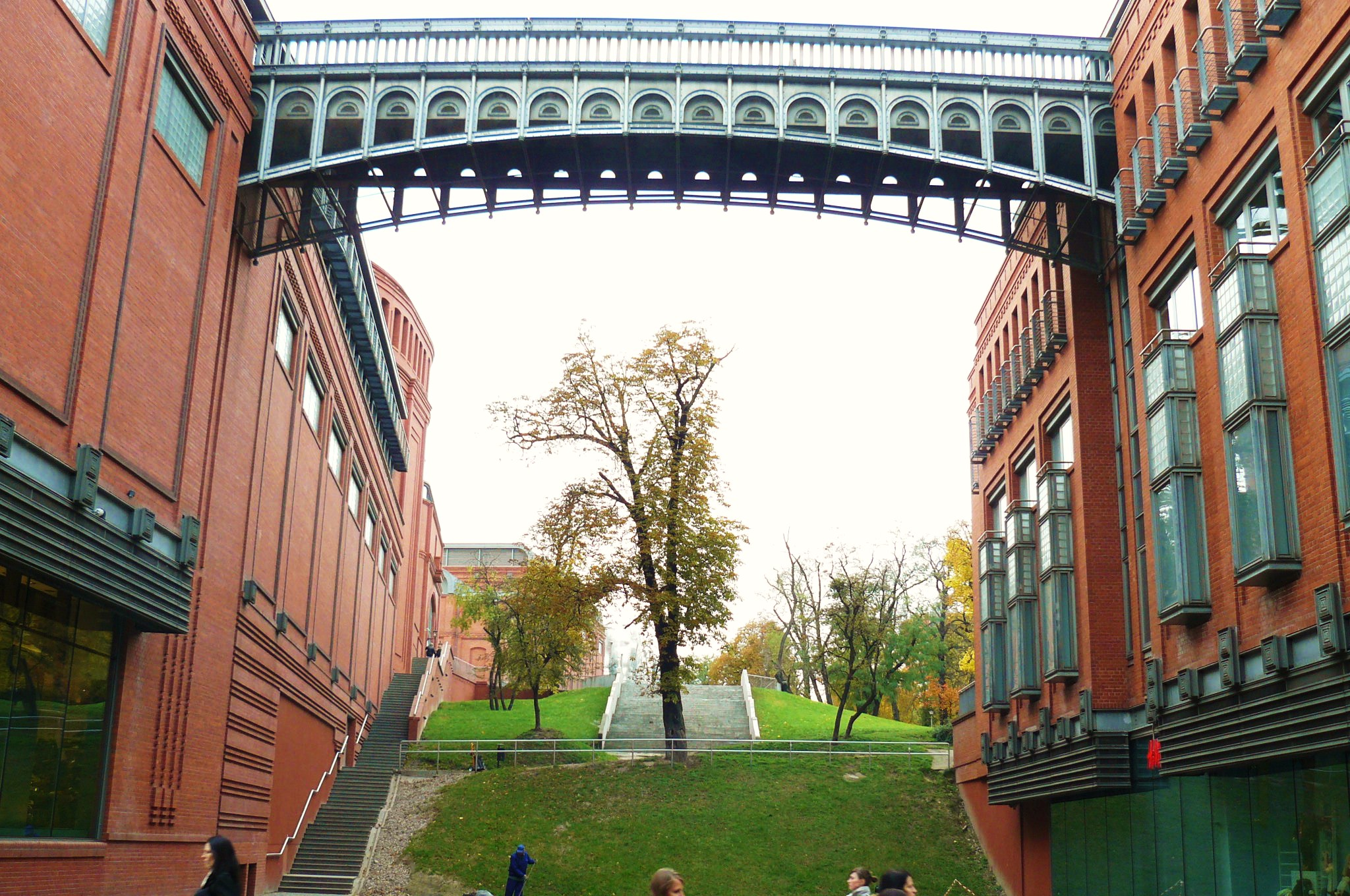
Dąbrowski Park near Stary Browar

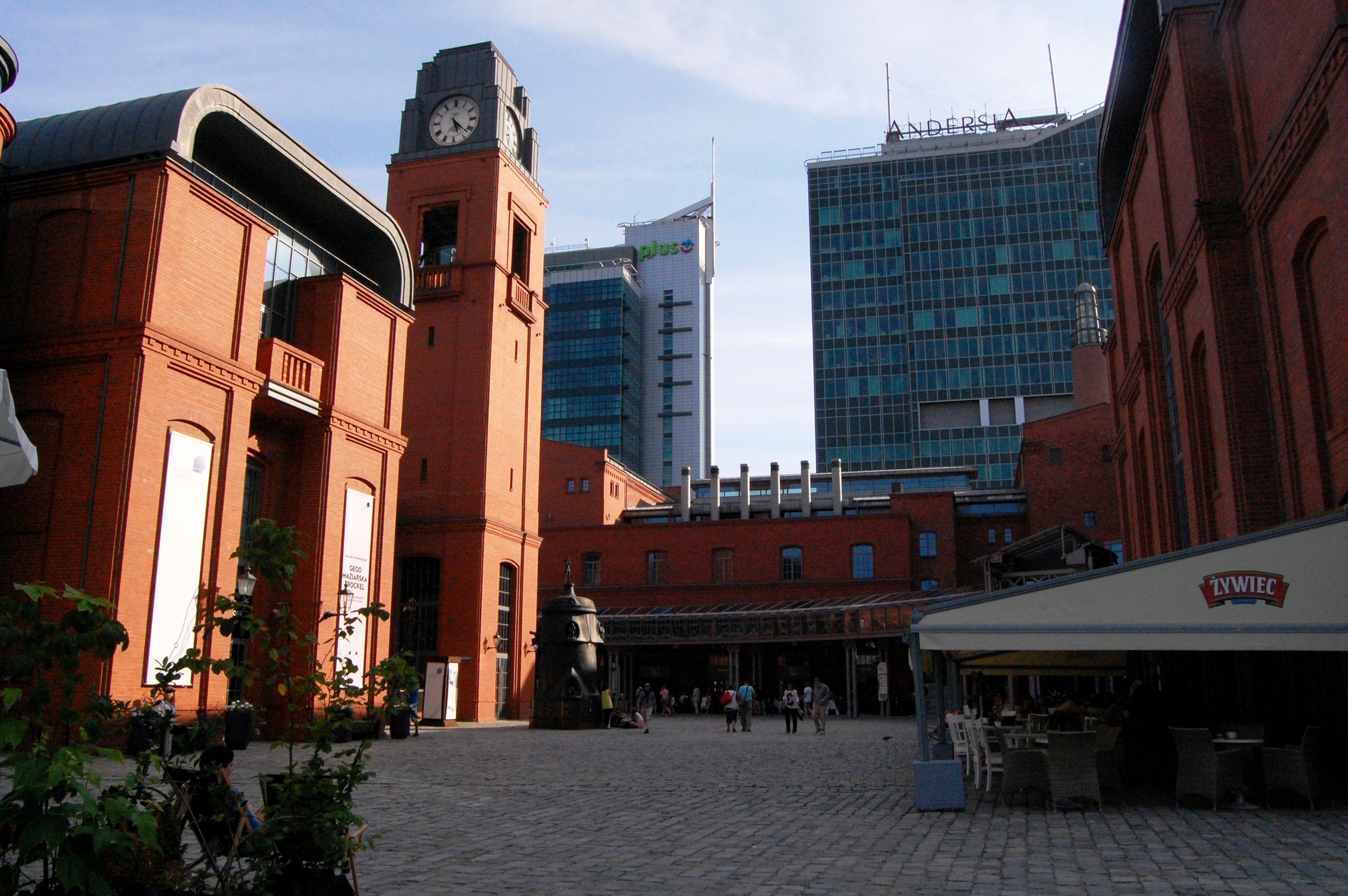
Stary Browar Clock Tower

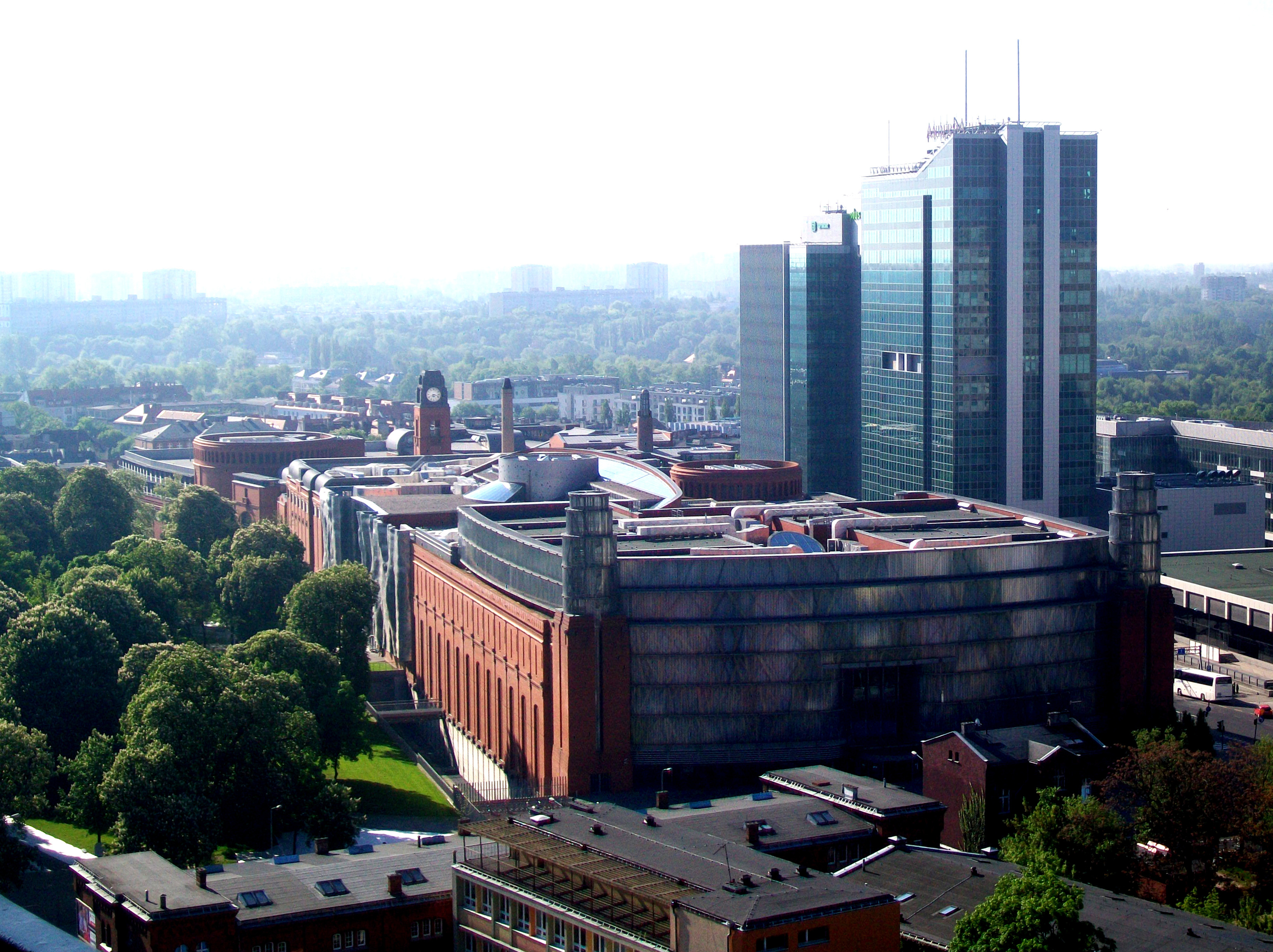
A view of Stary Browar from the 13th floor of Collegium Altum of the University of Economics

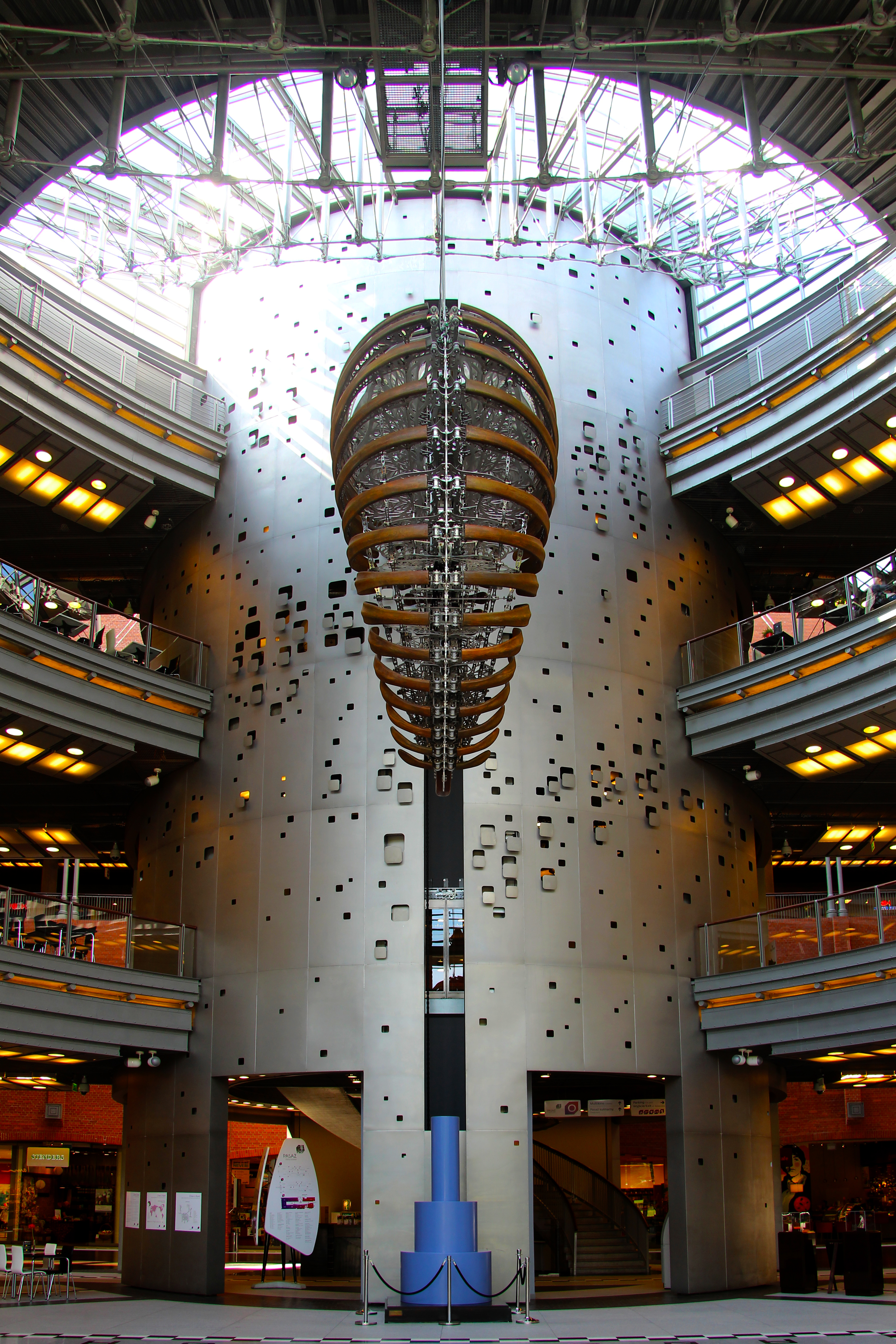
Interior of Stary Browar

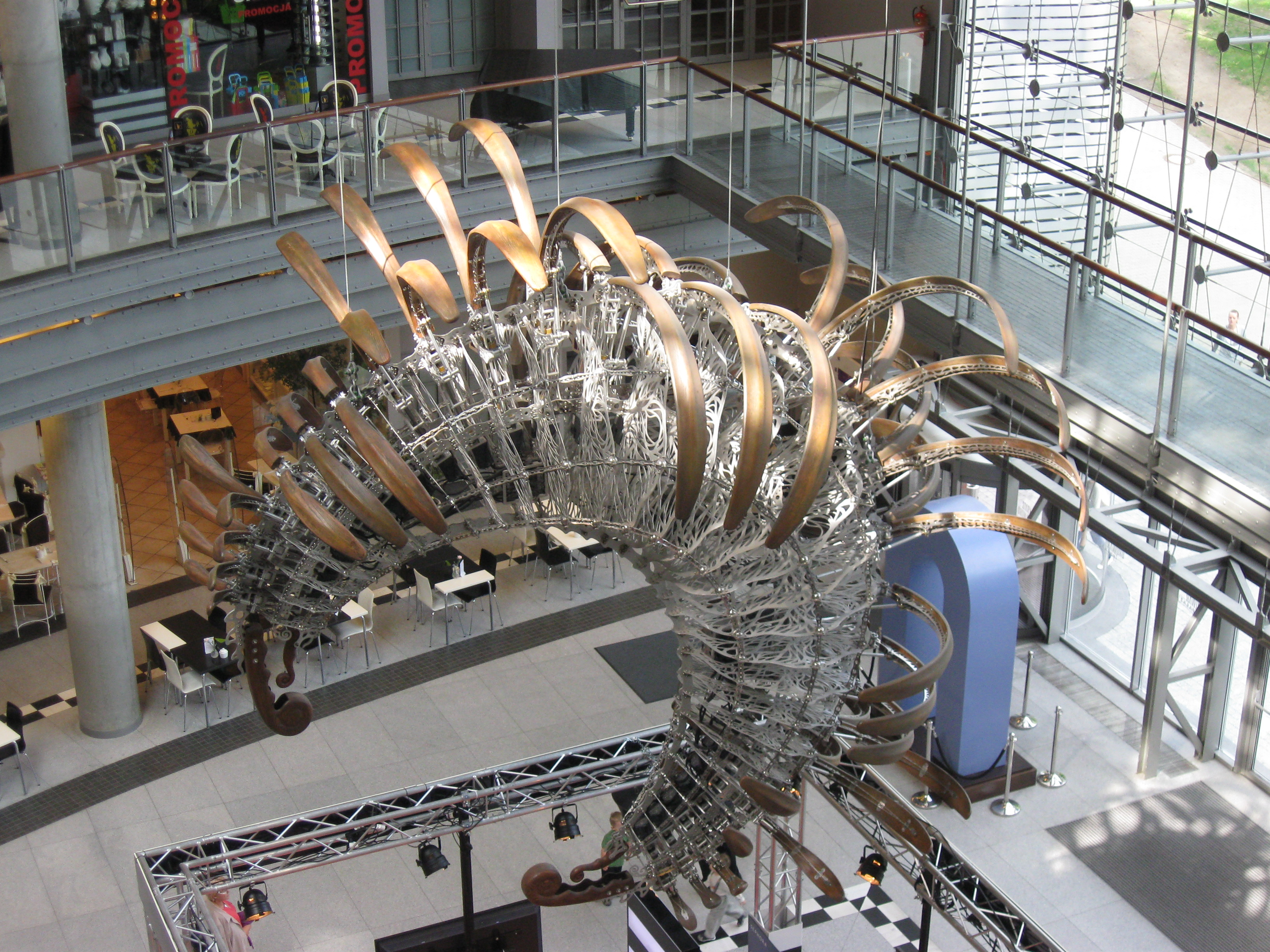
Stary Browar, Interior
