= Sebastian Kulczyk =

Polish businessman (born 1980)

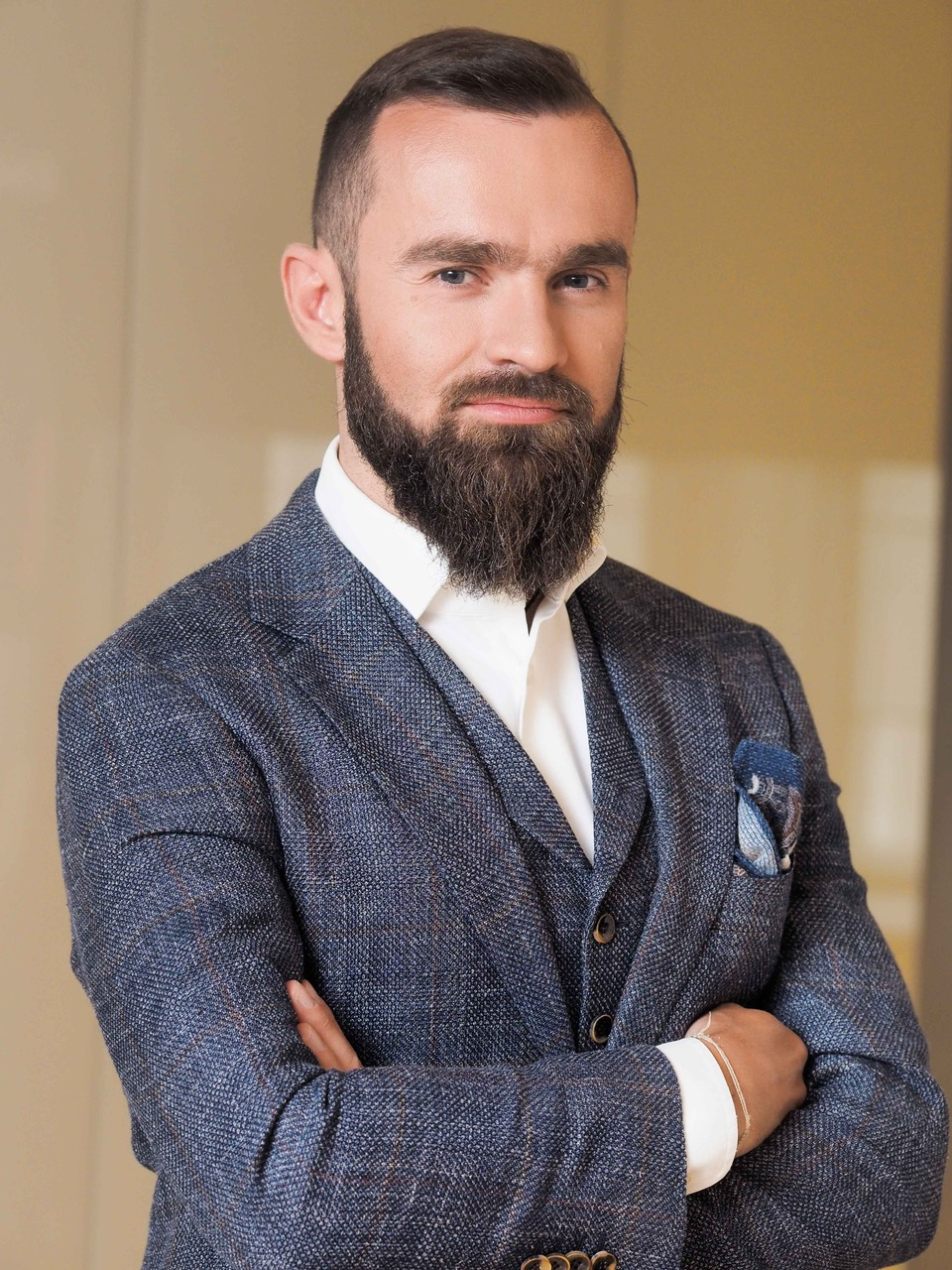
- Sebastian Kulczyk
- Born: 16 November 1980 (age 45); Poznań, Poland
- Education: Adam Mickiewicz University
- Occupation: Businessman
- Spouse: Katarzyna Jordan (m. 2010, divorced)
- Parent(s): Grażyna Kulczyk; Jan Kulczyk
- Relatives: Dominika Kulczyk (sister)

Sebastian Tomasz Kulczyk (born 16 November 1980) is a Polish billionaire businessman, and the son of Jan Kulczyk, who was the richest man in Poland, and Grażyna Kulczyk. He is president of Kulczyk Investments and specializes in the new technology sector. As of August 2024, his net worth was estimated at US$1.6 billion.

== Early life ==
He graduated from the Karol Marcinkowski High School No. 1 in Poznań, and the Adam Mickiewicz University in Poznań, majoring in management and marketing. He has also studied at the London School of Economics.

== Career ==
At age 19, Kulczyk received hundred thousand PLN from his parents and started network of Internet cafes called e24.pl, but he failed.

He then went on to establish an interactive marketing agency GoldenSubmarine.

From 2009 to 2010, he worked for Lazard investment bank in London, and at the digital media unit of Sony BMG in New York.

In December 2013, after returning from US, he became president of Kulczyk Investments, a company that was the foundation of his father's business, replacing Dariusz Mioduski who was in charge of the company from 2008. Jan Kulczyk delegated management to his son a year and a half before he died.

He is the founder of Manta Ray VC, which is investing in the new technology sector. He initiated a number of projects focused on supporting Polish startups. He is also the originator of InCredibles accelerating program, and serves as President of Jutronauci project's chapter.

His initiative has led to the emergence of Singularity University in Poland for the first time.

In 2015, he became the chairman of the supervisory board of chemical company CIECH.

== Personal life ==
On 5 June 2010, in Antibes, France, he married Katarzyna Jordan (daughter of Polish businessman Krzysztof Jordan). They have since divorced. His sister is Dominika Kulczyk.
