= Kulczyk Investments =

Luxembourg investment company

Kulczyk Investments Societe Anonyme
- Formerly: Kulczyk Investment House
- Company type: Private
- Industry: Investment
- Founded: Luxembourg (2007)
- Founder: Jan Kulczyk
- Headquarters: Luxembourg
- Area served: Europe, North America, Africa, Middle East, Asia
- Key people: Sebastian Kulczyk, CEO; Dominik Libicki, COO; Mariusz Nowak, CFO; Łukasz Rędziniak, board member, Jarosław Sroka, board member
- Subsidiaries: Kulczyk Holding
- Website: www.kulczykinvestments.com

Kulczyk Investments SA (former Kulczyk Investment House SA) is an international investment company established in 2007 by Polish businessman Jan Kulczyk. The company has operations in sectors including energy, infrastructure, chemicals, and mineral resources. Its activities in Poland are managed through Kulczyk Holding SA.

== History ==
The company was founded in 2007 by Jan Kulczyk. In November 2008, the company announced a change of name from Kulczyk Investment House to Kulczyk Investments.

The name of the company comes from the name of the businessman and founder of Kulczyk Holding, Jan Kulczyk, who died on July 29, 2015, and served as chairman of the Supervisory Board of Kulczyk Investments until his death.

== Business sectors ==
=== Energy ===
Polenergia owns operating onshore and offshore wind projects in Poland.

As a result, consolidation of assets of Polenergia Holding and Polish Energy Partners in August 2014, a new public company Polenergia SA was formed. The merger resulted in the creation of a private energy group. At the same time, the international Chinese fund CEE Equity Partners holds a 15.99% share in Polenergia.

In March 2018, Polenergia signed an agreement with Statoil to develop offshore wind farms in the Baltic Sea.

In August 2018, Dominika Kulczyk, who has a 50.2% stake in Polenergia SA, announced a tender offer to acquire remaining 49.8% stake in the company.

== Sponsorship activities ==
Kulczyk Investments is widely known from numerous sponsorship and CSR activities:

- Museum of the History of Polish Jews – a 20 million PLN donation from Kulczyk Holding for the permanent exhibition „1000 years of the history of Polish Jews”;
- Polish Olympic Committee – strategic sponsor;
- Ryszard Kapuściński Award – patron award;
- Malta Fundacja – main sponsor of Malta Festival Poznań;
- Grand Theatre – Polish National Opera – sponsorship agreement and funding of special projects;
- Arnold Szyfman Polish Theatre (Warsaw) – patron celebrations of the 100th anniversary of the Polish Theatre;
- The Krzysztof Penderecki European Centre for Music – financial support for the construction of the centre;
- Art Yard Sale – patron of the organization of art fair;
- Stanisław Moniuszko Grand Theatre, Poznań – support for Umberto Giordano's opera "Andrea Chenier and outdoor presentation of the opera" Carmen "by Georges Bizet;
- Henryk Wieniawski Musical Society – Kulczyk Foundation as a patron of the Society supports its activities, including preparations for the International Henryk Wieniawski Violin Making Competition and the International Henryk Wieniawski Violin Competition;
- The National Philharmonic in Warsaw – support in the organization of the series of concerts and events under the name „A Tribute to Arthur Rubinstein”.
- The Studio Theatre – sponsorship of HD transmissions from the Metropolitan Opera in New York Shows;
- The Jan Wejchert Award of the Polish Business Roundtable – Kulczyk Holding patron of the prize;
- Kulczyk Foundation – established in 2013 by Grażyna Kulczyk, dr Jan Kulczyk and Dominika Kulczyk. The objective of the Foundation is helping the poorest people by supporting transparent and efficient development projects in Poland and abroad. Through education, Kulczyk Foundation draws the attention of people and enterprises to the fact that helping the poorer countries and communities is one of the important means of development on the global scale. The Foundation helps the non-governmental organizations to operate professionally, increase their effectiveness and expand operations. It delivers not only financial support but also the know-how to efficiently change the reality;
- CEED Institute – founded by Jan Kulczyk in 2010, is an international think-tank aimed at promoting the achievements and the economic potential of Central and East European countries. The objective of the CEED Institute is the dissemination of ideas and projects intended to improve the efficiency and competitiveness of the CEE region. President Lech Wałęsa is the honorary ambassador of the CEED Institute;
- Green Cross Poland – in 2010, on the initiative of Jan Kulczyk, the Polish branch of Green Cross was launched for dialogue among business, administration, NGOs and academic centres. GCPL takes part in environmental protection projects related to green economy, green cities and clean water;
- The Lech Wałęsa Institute – Kulczyk Investments is the strategic partner of the Lech Wałęsa Institute. The institute has been established to bring together many social groups around the never-ageing ideas of state decentralisation, ethics in politics and necessity to nurture the tradition of independence. Creation of an expert platform supporting Lech Wałęsa allowed him to work for the benefit of Poland, both home and abroad;
- RESPECT Index – Kulczyk Investments has developed the methodology and co-created the RESPECT Index – the first stock exchange index of responsible companies in Central Europe. The publication of the index at the Warsaw Stock Exchange has commenced in November 2009 and initiated the development of the idea of responsible capital investments in Poland. In 2011, Kulczyk Investments has transferred the rights to the RESPECT Index to the Warsaw Stock Exchange. The index is still being developed and constitutes a tangible and a long-lasting asset created by the Kulczyk Investments specialists.
