= Dominika Kulczyk =

Polish businesswoman and sinologist (born 1977)

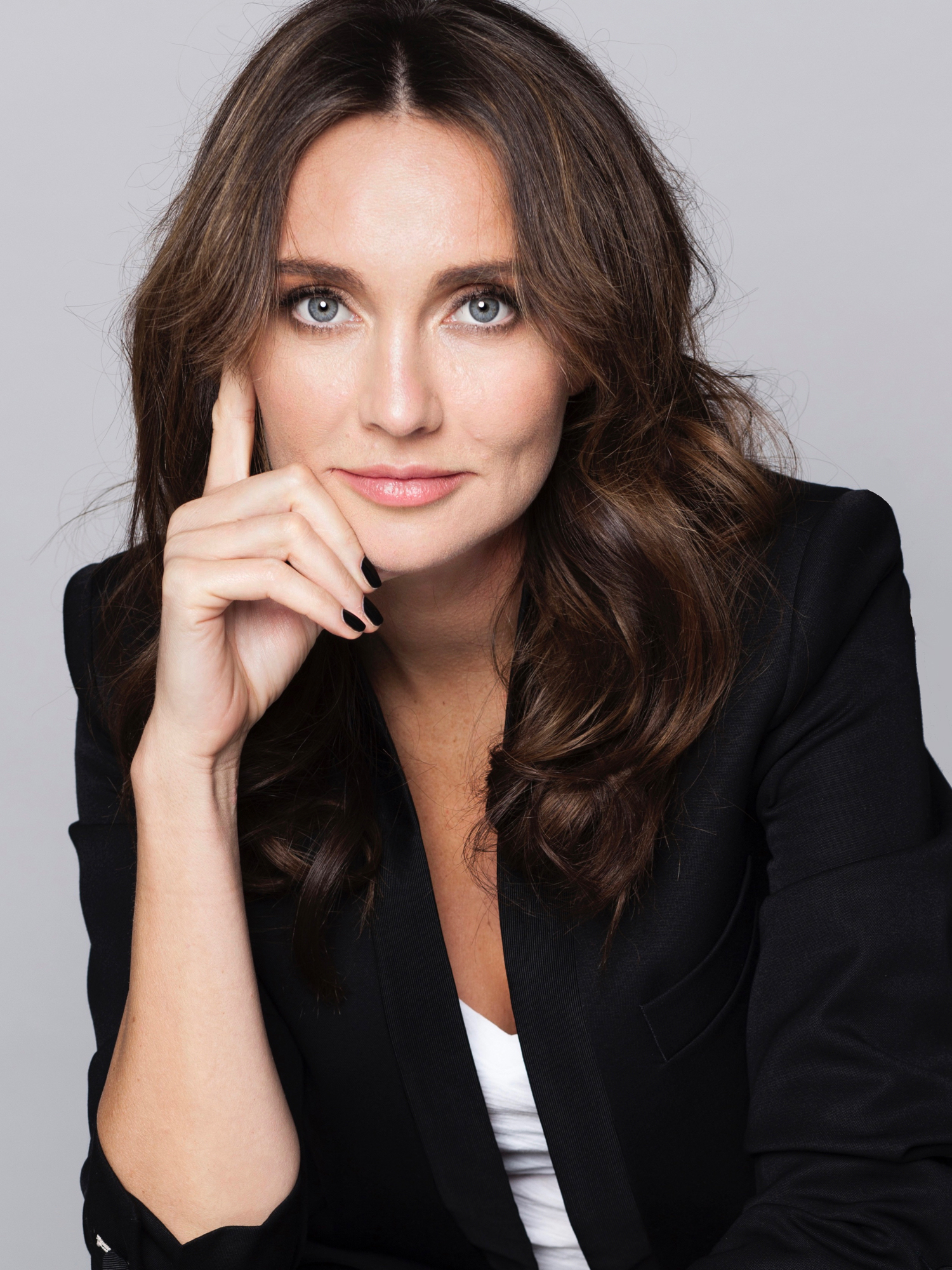
- Born: 30 July 1977 (age 48); Poznań, Poland
- Education: Adam Mickiewicz University
- Occupation: Businesswoman
- Spouse: Jan Lubomirski-Lanckoroński (m. 2001; div. 2013)
- Children: 2
- Parent(s): Grażyna Kulczyk; Jan Kulczyk
- Relatives: Sebastian Kulczyk (brother)

Dominika Kulczyk (born 30 July 1977) is a Polish billionaire businesswoman, and the daughter of Jan Kulczyk, who was Poland's richest man. She is the co-founder and president of the Kulczyk Foundation, chair of the supervisory board of Kulczyk Holding, chair of the supervisory board of Polenergia SA, and co-founder of the Values Consulting Group. She is the author of a TV series, the Domino Effect. As of August 2022, her net worth was estimated at US$1.9 billion.

== Early life ==
Dominika Kulczyk is the daughter of Grażyna Kulczyk and Jan Kulczyk, and sister of Sebastian Kulczyk.

She graduated from the Karol Marcinkowski Secondary School in Poznań. She is a graduate in Sinology from the Department of Oriental Studies, and in Political Sciences from the Faculty of Political Science and Journalism at Adam Mickiewicz University in Poznań. Between 1999 and 2000, she attended a course on Mandarin Chinese at two Chinese universities, Huadong Shifan University and Peking University. After her studies, she continued her education at the London Institute, and completed a course on strategic philanthropy organized by the Rockefeller Foundation.

== Career ==
Kulczyk is a co-founder and president of the Kulczyk Foundation, a philanthropic organization cooperating with Polish and international non-governmental organizations (NGOs).

In 2006, together with Jacek Santorski, she founded the Values Consulting Group, which specializes in training on the psychology of business and is involved in the project of the Academy of Leadership Psychology, co-organized by the Warsaw University of Technology.

Between 2010 and 2017, Kulczyk was president of the Polish branch of Green Cross International. In June 2013, she joined the supervisory board of Kulczyk Investments. In the holding company established by her father, Kulczyk was responsible for activities within the scope of corporate social responsibility (CSR and CSI) and international communication.

Following the death of their father in 2015, Kulczyk inherited her father's shares in Polenergia SA, with his interests in other companies left to her brother Sebastian. In 2016, she benefited from the sale of the family's shares in SABMiller.

Until June 2018, she was the chair of Kulczyk Investments' supervisory board.

Between 2013 and 2016, she was the vice-president of Polish Olympic Committee, and is now an adviser to their president.

In July 2018, she became the majority shareholder of Polenergia SA, and the chair of its supervisory board.

In 2022, her foundation bought Marie Curie's summer house in Saint-Remy-les-Chevreuse, which had been put up for sale. She plans to open there the House of Sisterhood, a place where outstanding women who followed in the footsteps of Curie would meet and work together as well as be presented with awards in recognition for their achievements.

== Personal life ==
Kulczyk was married to Jan Lubomirski-Lanckoroński from 2001 to 2013, when they divorced. They have two children together. She lives in Warsaw, Poland. In February 2020, she was reported to have paid £57.5 million for a house in Knightsbridge, London.
