= Grażyna Kulczyk =

Polish investor, art collector and philanthropist

- Grażyna Kulczyk in 2021
- Born: 5 November 1950 (age 74); Poznań, Poland
- Education: Adam Mickiewicz University
- Occupation(s): lawyer, investor, art collector
- Spouse: Jan Kulczyk (div. 2006)
- Children: Dominika Kulczyk, Sebastian Kulczyk

Grażyna Maria Kulczyk (Polish pronunciation: [ɡraˈʐɨna ˈkult͡ʂɨk]; born 5 November 1950) is a Polish lawyer, investor, art collector and philanthropist. In 2015, she was awarded the Knight's Cross of the Order of Polonia Restituta for her contributions to Polish culture and the promotion of Polish art.

== Education and career ==
She graduated in law and administration from the Adam Mickiewicz University in Poznań. Upon finishing her studies, she began to work in the Civil Law Institute at her alma mater. After a few years, she resigned and decided to pursue a career in business.

She is a supporter of contemporary art, avant-garde choreography and new technology and start-ups. She is particularly engaged in supporting entrepreneurship among women as well as the equal presence of women in STEM. She joined the board of the Modern Women's Fund Committee of the Museum of Modern Art, New York in 2015, and has been a board member of Museum of Modern Art in Warsaw for almost 10 years. In 2017, ARTnews magazine recognized her as one of the Top 200 Collectors in the world.

Kulczyk was married to late billionaire Jan Kulczyk with whom she had two children, Dominika (born 1977) and Sebastian (born 1980). They divorced in 2006.

In 2022, her net worth was estimated at PLN 1.9 billion (US$ 387 million) according to Wprost magazine, making her the fourth richest woman in Poland.

== Muzeum Susch ==
Muzeum Susch, founded by Kulczyk, opened on 2 January 2019, in Susch, Switzerland. It predominantly features works by renowned Polish avant-garde and contemporary artists such as Monika Sosnowska, Magdalena Abakanowicz, Piotr Uklański, Mirosław Bałka, Zofia Kulik, Paulina Olowska and Joanna Rajkowska.

== Art Stations Foundation / Stary Browar Nowy Taniec ==
Since 2004, Kulczyk's Art Stations Foundation by Grażyna Kulczyk has been providing support to develop contemporary choreography through its performative programme based in Poznań, under the name Stary Browar Nowy Taniec / Old Brewery New Dance. Stary Browar Nowy Taniec is located at the Stary Browar complex in Poznan.

== See also ==
- List of Poles
