= Central and Eastern Europe Development Institute =

Poland-based think tank

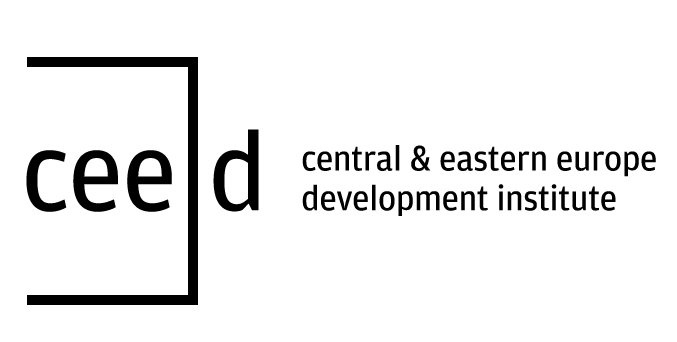

Central and Eastern Europe Development Institute (CEED) is an institute created to demonstrate and underline the investment and development potential of Central and Eastern European countries (Bulgaria, Croatia, Czech Republic, Estonia, Hungary, Latvia, Lithuania, Poland, Romania, Slovakia and Slovenia). CEED Institute sets up standards for regional cooperation and promotes values of free market economy, modernization, innovation and competitiveness. CEED Institute has been founded by Dr. Jan Kulczyk, Polish entrepreneur.

The institute is also supported by the key entrepreneurs from Central and Eastern Europe, the CEED Institute Programme Board, among others: Zdeněk Bakala - Czech businessman and financier who co-founded BXR, Sandor Demjan chairman of TriGranit, Indrek Neivelt an Estonian banker, Arūnas Šikšta - the Chairman of the Advisers group on the State controlled company's restructuring programme for the Prime minister office of the Republic of Lithuania, Former CEO & Managing Director TEO LT AB. President Lech Wałęsa is the honorary ambassador of the CEED Institute.
