= Jan Kulczyk =

Polish businessman (1950–2015)

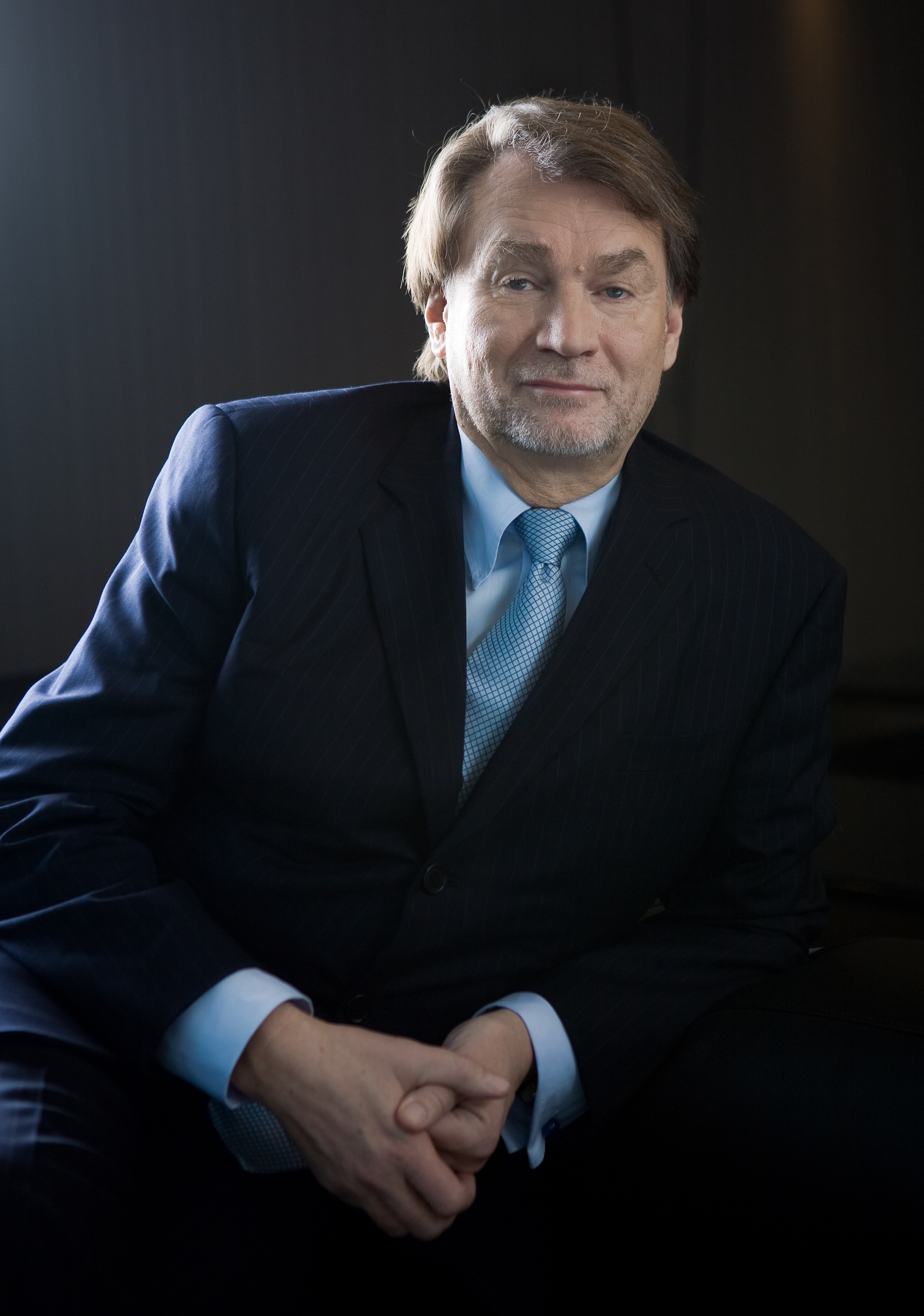
- Kulczyk in 2009
- Born: 24 June 1950; Bydgoszcz, Poland
- Died: 29 July 2015 (aged 65); Vienna, Austria
- Resting place: Jeżycki Cemetery, Poznań, Poland
- Education: Adam Mickiewicz University; Poznań University of Economics
- Occupation: Businessman
- Spouse: Grażyna Kulczyk
- Children: Sebastian Kulczyk; Dominika Kulczyk
- Parent: Henryk Kulczyk

Jan Jerzy Kulczyk (24 June 1950 – 29 July 2015) was a Polish billionaire businessman. He was the founder and owner of Kulczyk Holding (headquartered in Warsaw) and an international investment house Kulczyk Investments (former name: Kulczyk Investment House) with headquarters in Luxembourg and offices in London and Kyiv, Ukraine. According to Forbes, Kulczyk was the richest Pole at the time of his death.

== Education ==
Kulczyk graduated from VI Jan i Jędrzej Śniadeccy Secondary School in Bydgoszcz in 1968. He studied law at the Adam Mickiewicz University in Poznań and foreign trade at the Poznań University of Economics and Business (then: Academy of Economics in Poznań). He received a doctorate in political sciences and international law in 1975. He was also a researcher at the Institute for Western Affairs in Poznań, where he dealt with German issues (member of the Institute's honorary committee).

== Business career ==
In 1981, Kulczyk founded his first company with money from his father Henryk. The Interkulpol joint-venture was one of the first international trade companies formed in Poland since the second world war. In 1988, Kulczyk became the official Volkswagen dealer in Poland. His first large-scale deal was a PLN 150-million (35.7 million euros) sale of 3,000 Volkswagen cars delivered to the Polish police and the security services in the early 1990s. In 1991, Kulczyk Holding a limited liability company was founded. In 1993, the company changed its legal form into a joint-stock company. Kulczyk held the post of the chairman of the supervisory board.

The completed investments in his portfolio included: Telekomunikacja Polska (a 47.5% share in the years 2000–2005, held by a consortium comprising Kulczyk Holding and France Telecom (of which Kulczyk Holding held a 13.6% share); Polska Telefonia Cyfrowa (a 4.8% share in 1993–1999 in partnership with Deutsche Telekom); TUiR Warta Property Insurance Company (a nearly 70% share held in 1996–2006. All of the shares were stock-bought, except for a 19.8% share acquired from the State Treasury in a public tender); PTE Warta Pension Manager (a 50% share in 2000–2005); PKN Orlen (a nearly 5% share in 2001–2005). Polish oil refinery

In 2007, Kulczyk reorganized the Kulczyk Holding Group into Kulczyk Investment House, later known as Kulczyk Investments.

Kulczyk invested in energy, oil and gas, infrastructure, real estate and brewery sectors. His company Kulczyk Investments has 40% share in Neconde Energy Limited, an oil production in Nigeria, 3.49% in San Leon Energy (oil and gas exploration and production), 33.72% in Loon Energy Corporation (a company holding an oil exploration and production licenses in Colombia and Peru), 50.76% in Serinus Energy (an oil and gas exploration and production company operating in Ukraine, Tunisia and Romania) and 9.73% share in Ophir Energy (an oil and gas exploration and production company operating in Africa). Kulczyk Investments portfolio includes also a 15.4% share in Strata Limited, a company focused on development of mining projects in Africa and a 25% share in Centar, a company exploring for natural resources in Afghanistan and other countries in Central Asia and Africa.

In 2010, in cooperation with Silverstein Properties Inc., Kulczyk Silverstein Properties was founded as a joint-venture company specializing in development of commercial real estate projects in Central Europe.

In 2009, company traded a 28% share in Kompania Piwowarska for a 3% share in SABMiller – the world's second biggest beer producer.

Kulczyk Investments holds a 24% share in Autostrada Wielkopolska, a 40% share in Autostrada Wielkopolska II and a 45% share of Autostrada Eksploatacja through subsidiary companies. He also held a 58.42% share in Pekaes SA.

Kulczyk Investments created Polenergia, Poland's first private energy group with regional scope, operating in the sectors of energy generation, distribution and trading from conventional and unconventional sources. In 2011, the Kulczyk Group acquired a 100% share in Nowa Sarzyna Power Plant.

After Kulczyk's death in July 2015, his children became his successors. Dominika Kulczyk, as the vice-president of the supervisory board of Kulczyk Investments, is responsible for international relations and the CSR projects. Sebastian Kulczyk has been serving as the Kulczyk Investments CEO since December 2013, and in August 2015, he took his dead father's place in the supervisory board of Ciech S.A.

=== Other activities ===
Kulczyk was the co-founder of the Polish Business Roundtable. He was also the Honorary Chairman of the German – Polish Chamber of Commerce.

Since June 2006, he was member of the Green Cross International Board of Directors – a UN-affiliated organization focused on ecological safety. Since 6 October 2007, he held the position of the chairman of the board.

He was also the President of the Council for Supporting the Scientific Research at the Adam Mickiewicz University in Poznań, a long-term member of the Board of the National Museum of Poznań as well as member of the Church Economic Board. In addition, he was also member of the International Governors Board affiliated with the Peres Center for Peace.

In February 2008, he was incorporated into confraternity of the Order of Saint Paul.

In 2010, he founded the CEED Institute, a think-tank promoting the development of Central and Eastern Europe region.

In 2012, he donated PLN 20 million (4.76 million euros) to the Museum of the History of Polish Jews to co-found its core exhibition. It was the largest one-time donation ever made in Poland.

In March 2014, he founded the Council of Polish Investors in Africa, an initiative formed to support Polish companies in establishing business relations on the African markets. The Council consists of representatives of the largest Polish companies and enterprises investing on this continent, including Ursus, Navimor, Asseco, Kulczyk Investments, Polpharma, Grupa Azoty, Krezus and Lubawa.

=== Controversy ===
In 2004, Kulczyk was associated with the Orlen Scandal. The parliamentary investigative commission report stated that Kulczyk could have considerable influence over operations and human resources politics of PKN Orlen, incommensurable to the share he held. Moreover, the report stated that Kulczyk met with the former KGB resident in Poland, Vladimir Alganov.

Regarding the Orlen investigation, the proceedings at the Prosecutors’ Office in Katowice commenced and the parliamentary investigative commission was appointed. Kulczyk was heard as a witness by the prosecutor's office four times (the last one in April 2008) and submitted extensive explanation to the parliamentary investigative commission. Due to lack of evidence, the Prosecutor's Office discontinued the proceedings.

Kulczyk was also linked to the so-called Kulczyk Park affair. The Poznań city officials were accused of underrating the land value in the city center, where Kulczyk's wife carried out the Old Brewery investment.

== Personal life and death ==
Kulczyk was divorced with two children from his marriage with Grażyna Kulczyk: Dominika (born 1977) and Sebastian (born 1980). After the divorce, Joanna Przetakiewicz was his long-time partner.

In the years leading up to his death, Kulczyk commissioned the Lonsdaleite Estate, a new personal residence in St. Moritz, Switzerland. It was completed after his death and sold for over CHF 180 million, making it the most expensive house in Switzerland.

Kulczyk died on 29 July 2015, in Allgemeines Krankenhaus der Stadt Wien in Vienna due to postoperative complications, and was buried in the family vault at the Jeżycki cemetery in Poznań, next to his father, Henryk Kulczyk (1925–2013).

== The richest man in Poland ==
In 2012, the Forbes magazine put Kulczyk at the top of the richest businessmen in Poland ranking, with PLN 8.9 billion (2.1 billion euros). The same year, the Wprost magazine also put Kulczyk at the top of its ranking, assessing his wealth at PLN 9,7 billion. In 2013, the American edition of Forbes magazine rated Kulczyk 384th of the wealthiest people in the world, with a $3.5 billion worth fortune, making him the highest ranked Pole among the world's billionaires.

Kulczyk was top ranked 13 times at the list of the 100 richest Poles issued by Wprost. In 2007, he was ranked 12th, due to his divorce from Grażyna Kulczyk. In 2015, Forbes ranked him 418th richest man in the world ($4 billion).

== Awards and commendations ==
- Irena Sendler Award (2015)
- Officer's Cross of the Order Polonia Restituta (2015)
- Honorary Pearl of the Polish Economy in Economy category (2013)
- Friend of Nigeria (2013)
- Friend of Africa (2013)
- Patron of Culture Title (2012)
- Commander's Cross of the Order Polonia Restituta (1998)
- Kisiel Prize (1992)
