= Karahdih Halt railway station =

Railway station in Bihar

Karahdih Halt

General information
- Location: National Highway 82, Belouwa, Karahdih, Nalanda district, Bihar; India
- Coordinates: 25°04′08″N 85°25′58″E
- Elevation: 67 m (220 ft)
- System: Passenger train station
- Owner: Indian Railways
- Operator: East Central Railway zone
- Line: Bakhtiyarpur–Tilaiya line
- Platforms: 1
- Tracks: 1

Construction
- Structure type: Standard (on ground station)

Other information
- Status: Active
- Station code: KHDH
- Zone(s): East Central Railway zone
- Division(s): Danapur

History
- Former names: Bakhtiyarpur–Bihar Sharif light railway

Services
Preceding station	Indian Railways	Following station
Silao towards ?	East Central Railway zone Bakhtiyarpur–Tilaiya line	Sardar Patel Halt towards ?
Location

Karahdih Halt railway station is a halt railway station on the Bakhtiyarpur–Tilaiya line under the Danapur railway division of East Central Railway zone. It is situated beside National Highway 82 at Belouwa, Karahdih in Nalanda district in the Indian state of Bihar.
