= Silao (disambiguation) =

Silao may refer to:

== Places ==
- Silao, a city in the Mexican state of Guanajuato
  - Silao, Guanajuato, a municipality, the seat of Silao
- Silao, Nalanda, a town in Nalanda district, Bihar, India
  - Silao railway station

== People ==
- Silao Leaega (Silao Leaegailesolo) (born 1973), former Samoan rugby union player
- Silao Malo (born 1990), Samoan footballer
- Silao Vaisola Sefo (born 1979), Samoan rugby union player
