= Cheran, Nalanda =

Village in Bihar, India

Cheran
- Location in Bihar, India
- Coordinates: 25°21′40″N 85°32′32″E
- Country: India
- State: Bihar
- District: Nalanda

Area
  - Total: 3.1 km^{2} (1.2 sq mi)

Population (6500)
  - Total: 6,500
  - Density: 2,100/km^{2} (5,400/sq mi)

Languages
  - Official: Maghi, Hindi
- Time zone: UTC+5:30 (IST)
- PIN: 803110
- ISO 3166 code: IN-BR
- Nearest city: BiharSharif
- Sex ratio: 970 ♂/♀
- Literacy: 57%%
- Lok Sabha constituency: Nalanda
- Vidhan Sabha constituency: Harnaut

Cheran village is located in the Harnaut subdivision of the Nalanda district in the Indian state of Bihar. The locality is located 20 kilometers away from the sub-district headquarter Harnaut and 20 kilometers away from the district headquarter Biharsharif. According to 2009 statistics, Cheran village is also a gram panchayat.

The village covers a total area of 310 hectares. Cheran has a total population of 6100 people, of whom 3100 are males and 3000 are females. Cheran village has a literacy rate of 57.03%, of which 64.23% are males and 49.14% are females. Cheran village has approximately 1,376 houses.

Cheran is approximately 20 kilometers away from Biharsharif, which is the nearest town for all major economic activities.

The village is under the Harnaut Assembly constituency. The MLA is Hari Narayan Singh. Lok Sabha constituency is Nalanda and MP is Kaushlendra Kumar.

== People from the Village ==
Chandra Mohan Kumar
