= Rakesh Kumar Raushan =

Indian politician

Rakesh Kumar Roushan

Member of Bihar Legislative Assembly
- In office 2020 – 14 November 2025
- Preceded by: Chandrasen Prasad
- Succeeded by: Ruhel Ranjan
- Constituency: Islampur

Personal details
- Born: 2 January 1970 (age 56) Islampur, Bihar
- Party: Rashtriya Janata Dal; Communist Party Of India
- Parent: Krishan Ballabh Prasad
- Education: MA (Political Science) from Magadh University and LLB from Bihar Institute of Law Magadh University
- Occupation: Politician social work

Rakesh Kumar Roushan is an Indian politician who was elected as a member of Bihar Legislative Assembly from Islampur constituency in 2020 as a member of the Rashtriya Janata Dal. He was a member of the budget committee from 2022 - 2025.

== Political life ==
He entered politics in 2005 as member of Communist Party Of India but lost to Ramswaroop Prasad. His father represented this constituency several times.

== Legacy ==
- Krishan Ballabh Prasad

== See also ==
- Islampur, Bihar Assembly constituency
