= Nadiauna =

Village in Bihar, India

- Village
- Location in Bihar, India
- Coordinates: 25.20102°N 85.42405°E
- Country: India
- State: Bihar
- District: Nalanda
- Sub-district: Noorsarai

Area
  - Total: 2.99 km^{2} (1.15 sq mi)

Population (2011)
  - Total: 3,872
  - Density: 1,290/km^{2} (3,350/sq mi)
- Time zone: UTC+5:30 (IST)

Nadiauna is a village in Noorsarai subdistrict of Nalanda district, Bihar. As of 2011, it has a population of 3,872, in 601 households.

== History ==
Hiranand Sastri identified Nadiauna with the village of Nadivanāka identified in a copper-plate grant issued at Munger by Devapala of Bengal in the early 800s. The grant identified Nadivanāka as belonging to the naya (subdivision) of Ajapura (which Shastri identified with present-day Ajaipur), in the vishaya (province) of Rājagṛha (present-day Rajgir). In the grant, the revenues from Nadivanāka and several other villages, along with all of their attached fields, pastures, and mango and madhuka orchards, were granted tax-exempt for the upkeep of a Buddhist monastery at Nalanda that had been founded by the king Balaputra of Srivijaya.

== Demographics ==
As of 2011, Nadiauna had a population of 3,872, in 601 households. This population was 52.0% male (2,013) and 48.0% female (1,859). The 0-6 age group numbered 693 (363 male and 330 female), making up 17.9% of the total population. 549 residents were members of Scheduled Castes, or 14.2% of the total.

The 1961 census recorded Nadiauna (then part of Patna district) as having a total population of 1,490 people (754 male and 736 female), in 325 households and 294 physical houses. The area of the village was given as 739 acres and it had a primary school and a rural health centre at that point.

== Infrastructure ==
As of 2011, Nadiauna had 4 primary schools and 1 primary health sub centre. Drinking water was provided by well and hand pump; there were no public toilets. The village had a post office but no public library; there was at least some access to electricity for residential and agricultural (but not commercial) purposes. Streets were made of both kachcha and pakka materials.
