= Marahra railway station =

Railway station in Bihar

Marahra

General information
- Location: National Highway 82, Marahra, Nalanda district, Bihar; India
- Coordinates: 25°06′01″N 85°26′48″E
- Elevation: 62 m (203 ft)
- System: Passenger train station
- Owner: Indian Railways
- Operator: East Central Railway zone
- Line: Bakhtiyarpur–Tilaiya line
- Platforms: 1
- Tracks: 1

Construction
- Structure type: Standard (on ground station)

Other information
- Status: Active
- Station code: MH
- Zone(s): East Central Railway zone
- Division(s): Danapur

History
- Former names: Bakhtiyarpur–Bihar Sharif light railway

Services
Preceding station	Indian Railways	Following station
Nalanda towards ?	East Central Railway zone Bakhtiyarpur–Tilaiya line	Silao towards ?
Location

Marahra railway station is a railway station on the Bakhtiyarpur–Tilaiya line under the Danapur railway division of East Central Railway zone. It is situated beside National Highway 82 at Marahra in Nalanda district in the Indian state of Bihar.
