= Ram Swaroop Prasad =

Indian politician

Member of Parliament, Lok Sabha
- In office 2005-2009
- Preceded by: Nitish Kumar
- Succeeded by: Kaushalendra Kumar
- In office 1989-1991
- Preceded by: Vijay Kumar Yadav
- Succeeded by: Vijay Kumar Yadav
- Constituency: Nalanda, Bihar

Personal details
- Born: 5 January 1935 Hansepur, Nalanda, Bihar, British India
- Died: 2015
- Party: Janata Dal (United)
- Other political affiliations: Indian National Congress
- Spouse: Sunaina Devi

Ram Swaroop Prasad was an Indian politician who served as a Member of the 9th and 14th Lok Sabha from Nalanda Lok Sabha constituency. He also won the 1972 Bihar Legislative Assembly election from Ekangarsara Assembly constituencyi and 1985 Bihar Legislative Assembly election and October 2005 Bihar Legislative Assembly election from Islampur Assembly constituency.

== Personal life ==
He was born on 5 January 1939, in Nalanda district and married Sunaina Devi on 1 January 1951. In 2015, he died due to a heart attack at the age of 82.
