= Islampur Assembly constituency =

Islampur Assembly constituency may refer to

- Islampur, Bihar Assembly constituency
- Islampur, Maharashtra Assembly constituency
- Islampur, West Bengal Assembly constituency
