= Telhara, Nalanda district =

Telhara Telhāḍa
- village
- Location in Bihar, India
- Coordinates: 25.226334°N 85.181587°E
- Country: India
- State: Bihar
- District: Nalanda
- Gram Panchayat: Ekangarsarai

Languages
  - Spoken: Hindi, Magadhi
- Time zone: UTC+5:30 (IST)
- PIN: 801306
- Vehicle registration: BR-21
- Nearest cities: Jehanabad (22 km); Bihar Sharif (35 km); Patna (63 km)

Telhara is a village in Ekangarsarai block of Nalanda district, in Bihar. It is also the site of the Telhara monastery which dates back to the 1st-century CE.

== Buddhist monastery ==
Telhara was the site of a Buddhist monastery in ancient India. It has been mentioned as Teladhaka in the writings of the Chinese traveller Hiuen Tsang, who visited the place in the 7th century CE. It is mentioned in an inscription found at Nālandā which mentions a temple restored a man named Bālāditya, a Jyāvisa of Telāḍhaka who had emigrated from Kauśāmbī, in the eleventh year of Mahipala Deva.

It has been also mentioned in the Ain-i-Akbari as Tiladah, and is shown as one of the 46 mahals (administrative units) of the Bihar sarkar. Telhara was shown as a pargana in the maps prepared by the East India Company administration during 1842–45.

The ruins of Telhara were mentioned in an 1872 letter by A. M. Broadley, the then Magistrate of Nalanda. Broadley noted that a large number of stone and metal images were often found during the digging of graves at the top of one of the mounds. Metal images found were melted down. The State Government of Bihar started a new archaeological excavation of the site in December 2009, and later by the Bihar Heritage Development Society in 2020-2022. The work unearthed ancient pottery, antiques, and the remains of a three-storeyed structure mentioned by Xuanzang. Evidence of prayer halls and residential cells in the monastery has been found. The excavation revealed the following chronological layers:

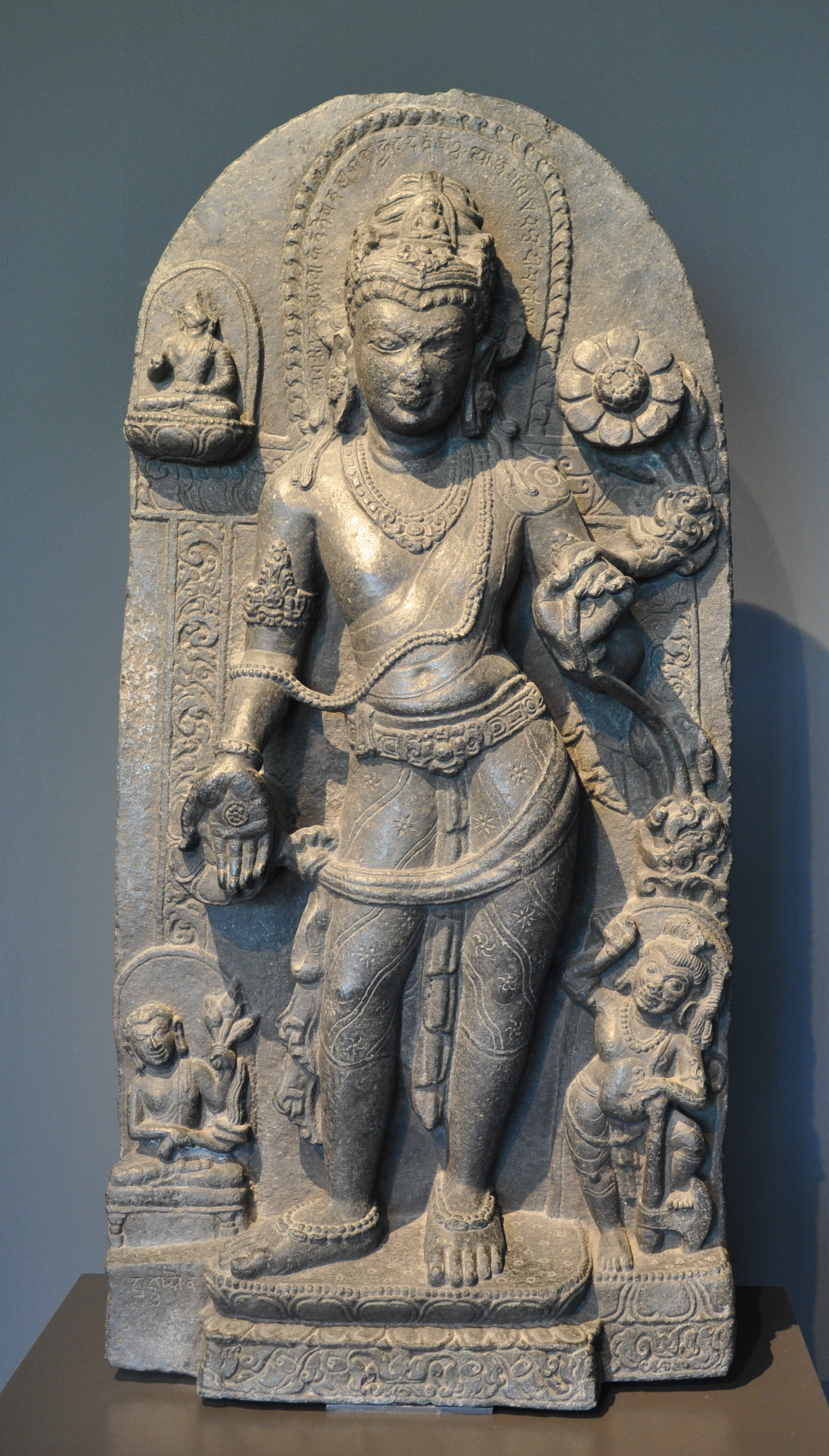
Bodhisattva Lokeshvara from Telhara, new at Rietberg Museum

1. Northern Black Polished Ware (circa 6th century BCE to 2nd Century BCE)
2. Kushan (2nd Century BCE to 4th century CE)
3. Gupta (4th to 6th century CE)
4. Early Medieval (mid 6th century CE to 13th century CE )
5. Medieval (13th century CE to mid-18th century CE )
6. Colonial (18th century to mid-20th century CE)

A number of sculptures from the site had been moved to museums during the British Raj. The Indian Museum in Kolkata houses the Maitreya and the twelve-armed Avalokiteswar images from Telhara. A Pala sculpture from the site is present at the Rietberg Museum in Zurich. Telhara has a mosque, which is said to have been built with the materials carried from the ruins of the Buddhist monastery. One pillar contained an inscription that mentions the place-name Telāḍhaka.

Remains of an ancient university (Mahavihara) on the site were unearthed in 2014.

A state Museum is being established to store the artifacts found.

== Administration ==
Telhara comes under the administration of the Ekangarsarai gram panchayat. There are 5 census villages in the Telhara area:

1. Hajipur
2. Khajepura
3. Rasulpur
4. Telhara
5. Telhara Sani
