= Nalanda Lok Sabha constituency =

Constituency of the Indian parliament in Bihar

Coordinates: 25.1°N 85.5°E

Nalanda
- Lok Sabha constituency

Constituency details
- Country: India
- Region: East India
- State: Bihar
- Assembly constituencies: Asthawan; Biharsharif; Rajgir; Islampur; Hilsa; Nalanda; Harnaut
- Established: 1957

Member of Parliament
- 18th Lok Sabha
- Incumbent Kaushalendra Kumar
- Party: JD(U)
- Alliance: NDA
- Elected year: 2024
- Preceded by: Ram Swaroop Prasad

Nalanda Lok Sabha constituency is one of the 40 Lok Sabha (parliamentary) constituencies in Bihar state in eastern India. In 1957, the erstwhile Patna Central constituency was renamed as Nalanda Lok Sabha constituency.

Most Successful parties from Nalanda Lok Sabha
1. JDU (7 Times) (41.2%)
2. INC(5 Times) (29.4%)
3. CPI (2 time) (11.8%)
4. Samta Party (2 time) (11.8%)
5. Janata Party (1 time) (5.88%)

== Assembly segments ==
Presently, Nalanda Lok Sabha constituency comprises the following seven Vidhan Sabha (legislative assembly) segments:

#	Name	District	Member	Party	2024 lead
171	Asthawan	Nalanda	Jitendra Kumar	JD(U)	JD(U)
172	Biharsharif	Nalanda	Sunil Kumar	BJP	JD(U)
173	Rajgir (SC)	Nalanda	Kaushal Kishore	JD(U)	JD(U)
174	Islampur	Nalanda	Ruhail Ranjan	JD(U)	JD(U)
175	Hilsa	Nalanda	Krishna Murari Sharan	JD(U)	JD(U)
176	Nalanda	Nalanda	Shrawan Kumar	JD(U)	JD(U)
177	Harnaut	Nalanda	Hari Narayan Singh	JD(U)	JD(U)

== Members of Parliament ==
=== 1952-1957 ===
As Patna Central Lok Sabha constituency.

Year	Name	Party
1952	Kailash Pati Sinha	Indian National Congress

=== 1957-Present ===
As Nalanda Lok Sabha constituency

Year	Name	Party
1957	Kailash Pati Sinha	Indian National Congress
1962	Siddheshwar Prasad	Indian National Congress
1967	Siddheshwar Prasad	Indian National Congress
1971	Siddheshwar Prasad	Indian National Congress
1977	Birendra Prasad	Janata Party
1980	Vijay Kumar Yadav	Communist Party of India
1984	Vijay Kumar Yadav	Communist Party of India
1989	Ram Swarup Prasad	Indian National Congress
1991	Vijay Kumar Yadav	Communist Party of India
1996	George Fernandes	Samata Party
1998	George Fernandes	Samata Party
1999	George Fernandes	Janata Dal (United)
2004	Nitish Kumar	Janata Dal (United)
2006^	Ram Swarup Prasad	Janata Dal (United)
2009	Kaushalendra Kumar	Janata Dal (United)
2014	Kaushalendra Kumar	Janata Dal (United)
2019	Kaushalendra Kumar	Janata Dal (United)
2024	Kaushalendra Kumar	Janata Dal (United)

^ by poll

== Election results ==
Vote share of Winning candidates
2024	48.88%
2019	52.45%
2014	34.93%
2009	52.65%
2006 (by-poll)	55.08%
2004	52.65%
1999	53.29%
1998	50.27%
1996	55.12%
1991	46.54%
1989	36.72%
1984	37.00%
1980	38.42%
1977	54.06%
1971	57.93%
1967	46.90%
1962	43.50%
1957	47.10%
1952	50.93%

=== 2024 ===
2024 Indian general election: Nalanda
Party	Candidate	Votes	%	±%
JD(U)	Kaushalendra Kumar	559,422	48.88	▼3.57
CPI(ML)L	Sandeep Saurav	3,90,308	34.11	New
NOTA	None of the above	19,217	1.68	▲0.86
Majority		1,69,114	14.77%	▲
Turnout		11,44,956	49.91	▲
JD(U) hold		Swing		

=== 2019 ===
2019 Indian general elections: Nalanda
Party	Candidate	Votes	%	±%
JD(U)	Kaushalendra Kumar	540,888	52.45	▲17.52
HAM(S)	Ashok Kumar Azad	2,84,751	27.61	New
IND.	Ramvilaf Paswan	21,276	2.06	
IND.	Brahamdev Prasad	16,346	1.59	
NOTA	None of the Above	8,426	0.82	▲0.23
Majority		2,56,137	24.84	
Turnout		10,31,874	48.79	
JD(U) hold		Swing		

=== 2014 ===
2014 Indian general elections: Nalanda
Party	Candidate	Votes	%	±%
JD(U)	Kaushalendra Kumar	3,21,982	34.93	▼17.72
LJP	Satya Nand Sharma	3,12,355	33.88	▲8.1
INC	Ashish Ranjan Sinha	1,27,270	13.81	▲11.44
BSP	Sanjay Kumar	23,595	2.56	▲0.1
CPI(ML)L	Shashi Yadav	19,477	2.11	
NOTA	None of the Above	5,452	0.59	
Majority		9,627	1.05	
Turnout		9,21,761	47.22	
JD(U) hold		Swing		

=== 2009 ===
2009 Indian general elections: Nalanda
Party	Candidate	Votes	%	±%
JD(U)	Kaushalendra Kumar	2,99,155	52.65	
LJP	Satish Kumar	1,46,478	25.78	
LTSD	Anil Singh	20,335	3.58	
BSP	Dev Kishore Rai	13,953	2.46	
INC	Ramswaroop Prasad	13,470	2.37	
IND.	Arun Kumar	10,676	1.88	
Majority		1,52,677	26.87	
Turnout		5,68,219	33.05	
JD(U) hold		Swing		

=== 2006 by-election ===
2006 Nalanda by-election
Party	Candidate	Votes	%	±%
JD(U)	Ramswaroop Prasad	171,592	55.08	
IND	Dr. Arun Kumar	54,859	17.61	
CPI	Gaya Singh	31,915	10.25	
IND	Ashok Prasad	23,691	7.61	
CPI(ML)L	Rameshwar Prasad	17,515	5.62	
SAP	Brahma Nand Mandal	4,778	1.53	
IND	Alanandan Paswan	3,750	1.20	
ABAS	Shiv Pratap Singh	3,409	1.10	
Majority		116,733	37.47	
Turnout				
JD(U) hold		Swing		

=== 2004 ===
2004 Indian general election: Nalanda
Party	Candidate	Votes	%	±%
JD(U)	Nitish Kumar	471,310	52.65	
LJP	Dr. Kumar Pushpanjay	368,914	41.21	
CPI(ML)L	Permanand Prasad	19,124	2.14	
BSP	Ram Prawesh Prasad	16,489	1.84	
SP	Jageshwar Yadav	4,479	0.50	
RSMD	Bajang Prasad Kesari	1,782	0.20	
SS	Shiv Shankar Prasad	886	0.10	
IND	6 Independent Candidates	12,132	1.36	
Majority		102,396	11.44	
Turnout				
JD(U) hold		Swing		

=== 1999 ===
1999 Indian general election: Nalanda
Party	Candidate	Votes	%	±%
JD(U)	George Fernandes	464,458	53.29	
CPI	Gaya Singh	358,637	41.15	
CPI(ML)L	Surendra Ram	42,612	4.89	
SJP(R)	Siwa Shankar Prasad	1,750	0.20	
IND	5 Independent Candidates	4,122	0.48	
Majority		105,821	12.14	
Turnout		878,611	74.46	
Swing to JD(U) from SAP		Swing		

=== 1998 ===
1998 Indian general election: Nalanda
Party	Candidate	Votes	%	±%
SAP	George Fernandes	444,784	50.27	
RJD	Ram Swaroop Prasad	329,114	37.20	
CPI(ML)L	Surendra Ram	51,291	5.80	
CPI	Vijay Kumar Yadav	49,539	5.60	
IC(S)	Arjun Pandey	2,356	0.27	
SS	Shivshankar Prasad	1,741	0.20	
IND	5 Independent Candidates	5,894	0.67	
Majority		115,670	13.07	
Turnout		894,028	75.89	
SAP hold		Swing		

=== 1996 ===
1996 Indian general election: Nalanda
Party	Candidate	Votes	%	±%
SAP	George Fernandes	486,703	55.12	
CPI	Vijai Kumar Yadav	318,839	36.11	
CPI(ML)L	Mitra Nand Singh	33,184	3.76	
INC	Satish Kumar	25,722	2.91	
PSSS (Note: Proutist Sarva Samaj Samiti)	Virendra Kumar	479	0.05	
IND	29 Independent Candidates	18,089	2.06	
Majority		167,864	19.01	
Turnout		890,894	75.94	
Swing to SAP from CPI		Swing		

=== 1991 ===
1991 Indian general election: Nalanda
Party	Candidate	Votes	%	±%
CPI	Vijoy Kumar Yadav	365,566	46.54	
INC	Ram Swaroop Prasad	273,695	34.84	
IPF	Mitranand Singh	69,331	8.83	
BJP	Chandrakanta Sinha	66,789	8.50	
BSP	Usha Prasad	2,355	0.30	
IND	14 Independent Candidates	6,157	0.78	
OTH	4 Other Party Candidates	1,679	0.22	
Majority		91,871	11.70	
Turnout		809,665	73.52	
Swing to CPI from INC		Swing		

=== 1989 ===
1989 Indian general election: Nalanda
Party	Candidate	Votes	%	±%
INC	Ram Saroop Prasad	256,349	36.72	
CPI	Vijoy Kumar Yadav	245,137	35.11	
BJP	Chandrakanta Sinha	119,834	17.17	
IPF	Krishna Deo Singh Yadav	66,536	9.53	
IND	7 Independent Candidates	7,066	1.01	
OTH	3 Other Party Candidates	3,200	0.46	
Majority		11,212	1.61	
Turnout		709,017	65.33	
Swing to INC from CPI		Swing		

=== 1984 ===
1984 Indian general election: Nalanda
Party	Candidate	Votes	%	±%
CPI	Vijay Kumar Yadav	230,531	37.00	
INC	Pankaj Kumar Sinha	191,060	30.67	
BJP	Vishwa Mohan Choudhary	151,100	24.25	
IND	16 Independent Candidates	50,330	8.08	
Majority		39,471	6.33	
Turnout		630,485	69.77	
CPI hold		Swing		

=== 1980 ===
1980 Indian general election: Nalanda
Party	Candidate	Votes	%	±%
CPI	Vijay Kumar Yadav	198,959	38.42	
INC(U)	Sidheshwar Prasad	136,358	26.33	
INC(I)	Ram Sharan Prasad Singh	117,433	22.68	
JP	Virendra Prasad	56,896	10.99	
IND	5 Independent Candidates	8,146	1.57	
Majority		62,601	12.09	
Turnout		525,087	64.16	
Swing to CPI from JP		Swing		

=== 1977 ===
1977 Indian general election: Nalanda
Party	Candidate	Votes	%	±%
JP	Birendra Prasad	284,684	54.06	
CPI	Vijay Kumar Yadav	143,662	27.28	
INC	Sidheshwar Prasad	81,940	15.56	
IND	4 Independent Candidates	8,746	1.66	
OTH	2 Other Party Candidates	7,618	1.45	
Majority		141,022	26.78	
Turnout		536,717	71.63	
Swing to JP from INC		Swing		

=== 1971 ===
1971 Indian general election: Nalanda
Party	Candidate	Votes	%	±%
INC	Sedheshwar Prasad	223,398	57.93	
ABJS	Shyam Sunder Prasad	93,698	24.30	
INC(O)	Ram Raj Prasad Singh	42,259	10.96	
IUML	H. Rashid	10,518	2.73	
IND	Guru Sahay Arya	5,591	1.45	
IND	Brij Nandan Yadav	5,237	1.36	
IND	Ram Prasad Singh	2,903	0.75	
BKD	Ram Naresh Sharma	2,033	0.53	
Majority		129,700	33.63	
Turnout		391,876	62.04	
INC hold		Swing		

=== 1967 ===
1967 Indian general election: Nalanda
Party	Candidate	Votes	%	±%
INC	S. Prasad	148,410	46.90	
ABJS	K. N. P. Singh	70,317	22.22	
CPI	S. A. Ahmed	57,192	18.07	
IND	B. N. Prasad	22,775	7.20	
IND	S. Mochi	17,770	5.62	
Majority		78,093	24.68	
Turnout		329,789	55.45	
INC hold		Swing		

=== 1962 ===
1962 Indian general election: Nalanda
Party	Candidate	Votes	%	±%
INC	Sidheshwar Prasad	95,883	43.50	
CPI	Vijay Kumar Yadav	58,969	26.75	
ABJS	Hari Har Prasad	40,921	18.56	
HM	Bodh Narain Prasad	13,089	5.94	
IND	Moqtazib Shah	6,622	3.00	
IND	Badro Prasad Singh	4,941	2.24	
Majority		36,914	16.75	
Turnout		228,036	50.26	
INC hold		Swing		

=== 1957 ===
1957 Indian general election: Nalanda
Party	Candidate	Votes	%	±%
INC	Kailash Pati Singh	75,835	47.10	
IND	Krishna Pd. Sinha	57,516	35.72	
IND	Bodhnarayan Prasad	16,408	10.19	
IND	Badri Pd. Singh	11,245	6.98	
Majority		18,319	11.38	
Turnout		161,004	45.97	
INC hold		Swing		

=== 1952 ===
1952 Indian general election: Patna Central
Party	Candidate	Votes	%	±%
INC	Kailash Pati Sinha	66,982	50.93	
IND	Chandrika Singh	20,581	15.65	
HM	Bodh Narayan Prasad	19,225	14.62	
Socialist	Nageshwar Prasad	17,851	13.57	
IND	Chandra Maula Prasad	6,867	5.22	
Majority		46,401	35.28	
Turnout		131,506	55.53	
INC win (new seat)				

== See also ==
- Patna Central Lok Sabha constituency
- Nalanda district
- List of constituencies of the Lok Sabha
