= Nalanda Assembly constituency =

Legislative assembly in Bihar, India

Nalanda
- Constituency No. 176 for the Bihar Legislative Assembly

Constituency details
- Country: India
- Region: East India
- State: Bihar
- District: Nalanda
- Lok Sabha constituency: Nalanda
- Established: 1977
- Total electors: 325,999

Member of Legislative Assembly
- 18th Bihar Legislative Assembly
- Incumbent Shravan Kumar
- Party: JD(U)
- Alliance: NDA
- Elected year: 2025

Nalanda is one of 243 constituencies of legislative assembly of Bihar. It is a part of Nalanda Lok Sabha constituency along with other assembly constituencies viz. Rajgir, Harnaut, Islampur, Hilsa, Asthawan and Bihar Sharif.

Most successful parties from Nalanda Assembly constituency
1. Janata Dal (United) 7 times (55.0%)
2. Samata Party 2 times (15.0%)
3. Indian National Congress 2 times (15.0%)
4. Independent 2 times (15.0%)

== Overview ==
Nalanda comprises CD Blocks Noorsarai & Ben; Gram Panchayats Nirpur, Bargaon & Surajpur of Silao CD Block; Gram Panchayats Biyavani, Maghrconstituenciesa, Dumrawan, Pachauri, Ranabigha & Meghi Nagwan of Bihar CD Block; Gram Panchayats Barnausa, Meyar, Bhui, Pilkhi, Goraur, Nahub, Pathraura & Lodipur of Rajgir CD Block.

== Members of the Legislative Assembly ==
| Election | Name | Party |
|---|---|---|
| 1977 | Shyam Sundar Prasad Singh | Indian National Congress |
| 1980 | Ram Naresh Singh | Independent politician |
| 1985 | Shyam Sunder Prasad Singh | Indian National Congress |
| 1990 | Ram Naresh Singh | Independent politician |
| 1995 | Shrawan Kumar | Samata Party |
| 2000 | Shrawan Kumar | Samata Party |
| 2005 (Feb) | Shrawan Kumar | Janata Dal (United) |
| 2005 (Oct) | Shrawan Kumar | Janata Dal (United) |
| 2010 | Shrawan Kumar | Janata Dal (United) |
| 2015 | Shrawan Kumar | Janata Dal (United) |
| 2020 | Shrawan Kumar | Janata Dal (United) |
| 2025 | Shrawan Kumar | Janata Dal (United) |

== Election results ==
Vote share of winning candidates
| 2025 | 52.77% |
| 2020 | 38.97% |
| 2015 | 44.78% |
| 2010 | 49.78% |
| Oct 2005 | 46.69% |
| Feb 2005 | 39.13% |
| 2000 | 39.45% |

=== 2025 ===
2025 Bihar Legislative Assembly election: Nalanda
| Party | Candidate | Votes | % | ±% |
|---|---|---|---|---|
| JD(U) | Shrawan Kumar | 105,432 | 52.77 | +13.8 |
| INC | kaushlendra Kumar | 72,424 | 36.25 | +26.05 |
| JSP | Kumari Poonam Sinha | 5,206 | 2.61 | |
| BJKP | Baijnath Prasad | 3,581 | 1.79 | |
| BSP | Priyadarshi Ashok | 2,498 | 1.25 | |
| NOTA | None of the above | 4,829 | 2.42 | +1.64 |
| Majority | | 33,008 | 16.52 | +7.03 |
| Turnout | | 199,789 | 61.29 | +6.61 |
| JD(U) hold | | Swing | | |

=== 2020 ===
2020 Bihar Legislative Assembly election: Nalanda
| Party | Candidate | Votes | % | ±% |
|---|---|---|---|---|
| JD(U) | Shrawan Kumar | 66,066 | 38.97 | −5.81 |
| Jantantrik Vikas Party | Kaushlendra Kumar | 49,989 | 29.48 | |
| INC | Gunjan Patel | 17,293 | 10.2 | |
| LJP | Ram Keshwar Prasad | 10,951 | 6.46 | |
| RLSP | Sonu Kumar | 5,344 | 3.15 | |
| Independent | Kumar Rajesh | 2,506 | 1.48 | |
| Bahujan Lok Dal | Mani Kumar Singh | 2,191 | 1.29 | |
| Independent | Rahul Raushan | 1,976 | 1.17 | |
| Maanavvaadi Janta Party | Sanyukta Kumari | 1,884 | 1.11 | +0.74 |
| NOTA | None of the above | 1,316 | 0.78 | −3.25 |
| Majority | | 16,077 | 9.49 | +7.64 |
| Turnout | | 169,552 | 54.68 | −2.57 |
| JD(U) hold | | Swing | | |

=== 2015 ===
2015 Bihar Legislative Assembly election: Nalanda
| Party | Candidate | Votes | % | ±% |
|---|---|---|---|---|
| JD(U) | Shrawan Kumar | 72,596 | 44.78 | |
| BJP | Kaushalendra Kumar | 69,600 | 42.93 | |
| Independent | Arunesh Kumar Yadav | 3,558 | 2.19 | |
| Independent | Sanjay Kumar | 1,678 | 1.04 | |
| BSP | Dilip Kumar | 1,583 | 0.98 | |
| NOTA | None of the above | 6,531 | 4.03 | |
| Majority | | 2,996 | 1.85 | |
| Turnout | | 162,117 | 57.25 | |
| JD(U) hold | | Swing | 10.66 | |

=== 2010 ===
2010 Bihar legislative assembly election: Nalanda
| Party | Candidate | Votes | % | ±% |
|---|---|---|---|---|
| JD(U) | Shrawan Kumar | 61532 | 49.78 | |
| RJD | Arun Kumar | 37030 | 30.63 | |
| JD(U) hold | | Swing | | |

=== 2005(October) ===
October 2005 Bihar Legislative Assembly election: Nalanda
| Party | Candidate | Votes | % | ±% |
|---|---|---|---|---|
| JD(U) | Shrawan Kumar | 37,806 | 46.69 | +7.56 |
| AIFB | Ram Naresh Singh | 33,756 | 41.69 | +9.73 |
| BSP | Vijay Kumar | 2,312 | 2.86 | +1.48 |
| CPI(ML)L | Sidheshwar Rabidas | 2,186 | 2.70 | +1.10 |
| Independent | Shiv Kumar Prasad | 1,701 | 2.10 | +0.90 |
| Independent | Paswan Ajay "Samrat" | 1,618 | 2.00 | |
| Independent | Kamla Prasad | 1,600 | 1.98 | |
| Majority | | 4,050 | 5.00 | −2.17 |
| Turnout | | 80,979 | | |
| JD(U) hold | | Swing | | |

=== 2005(feb) ===
2005 Bihar Legislative Assembly election: Nalanda
| Party | Candidate | Votes | % | ±% |
|---|---|---|---|---|
| JD(U) | Shrawan Kumar | 33,115 | 39.13 | |
| AIFB | Ram Naresh Singh | 27,045 | 31.96 | |
| RJD | Shrawan Kumar | 13,527 | 15.98 | |
| INC | Anil Kumar | 3,048 | 3.60 | |
| CPI(ML)L | Ajit Kumar | 1,355 | 1.60 | |
| BSP | Shiv Shankar Prasad | 1,169 | 1.38 | |
| Independent | Shiv Kumar Prasad | 1,012 | 1.20 | |
| Independent | Ashok Kumar | 862 | 1.02 | |
| Independent | Surendra Kumar | 809 | 0.96 | |
| Independent | Shiv Kumar Mandal | 491 | 0.58 | |
| SS | Ramkeshwar Prasad | 424 | 0.50 | |
| AD | Ram Piyare Prasad | 417 | 0.49 | |
| Independent | Satish Mahto | 406 | 0.48 | |
| Independent | Ajay Kumar | 325 | 0.38 | |
| Independent | Arvind Kumar | 313 | 0.37 | |
| Independent | Raj Kumar Paswan | 311 | 0.37 | |
| Majority | | 6,070 | 7.17 | |
| Turnout | | 84,629 | | |
| JD(U) gain from RJD | | Swing | | |

=== 2000 ===
2000 Bihar Legislative Assembly election: Nalanda
| Party | Candidate | Votes | % | ±% |
|---|---|---|---|---|
| SAP | Shrawan Kumar | 55,940 | 39.45 | |
| Independent | Ram Naresh Singh | 41,498 | 29.26 | |
| RJD | Jagdish Prasad | 33,219 | 23.43 | |
| CPI(ML)L | Umesh Kumar | 5,157 | 3.64 | |
| INC | Ratnesh Kumar | 2,221 | 1.57 | |
| NCP | Upendra Kumar | 1,492 | 1.05 | |
| Independent | Ishwar Prasad Sinha | 792 | 0.56 | |
| Akhil Bharatiya Jan Sangh | Ramawatar Prasad | 514 | 0.36 | |
| BSP | Shrawan Kumar Verma | 414 | 0.29 | |
| Independent | Vinay Prakash Verma | 188 | 0.13 | |
| RPI | Bhagwat Prasad | 170 | 0.12 | |
| AD | Anil Kumar | 121 | 0.09 | |
| Independent | Krishna Nandan Prasad | 82 | 0.06 | |
| Majority | | 14,442 | 10.19 | |
| Turnout | | 143,124 | 76.66 | |
| SAP hold | | Swing | | |

== See also ==
- Nalanda district
- List of Assembly constituencies of Bihar
