= Krishan Ballabh Prasad =

Indian politician

Member of Bihar Legislative Assembly
- In office 1977–1980
- Preceded by: Ramsharan Prasad Singh
- Succeeded by: Pankaj Kumar Sinha
- Constituency: Islampur
- In office 1990–1995
- Preceded by: Ram Swaroop Prasad
- Succeeded by: Self
- Constituency: Islampur
- In office 1995–2000
- Succeeded by: Ramswaroop Prasad
- Constituency: Islampur

Personal details
- Born: Islampur, Bihar
- Party: Communist Party of India
- Children: Rakesh Kumar Raushan
- Occupation: Politician social work

Krishan Ballabh Prasad was an Indian politician who was elected as a member of Bihar Legislative Assembly from Islampur constituency several times from 1977 to 2000, as a member of Communist Party of India.

== See also ==
- Islampur, Bihar Assembly constituency
