= Ishwarchak =

Coordinates: 25°18′44″N 85°40′9″E

Ishwarchak is a village situated in the Nalanda district of Bihar State in India.
