= Islampur, Bihar Assembly constituency =

Legislative assembly of Bihar, India

- Constituency No. 174 for the Bihar Legislative Assembly

Constituency details
- Country: India
- Region: East India
- State: Bihar
- District: Nalanda
- Established: 1951
- Total electors: 303,226

Member of Legislative Assembly
- 18th Bihar Legislative Assembly
- Incumbent Ruhel Ranjan
- Party: JD(U)
- Alliance: NDA
- Elected year: 2025

Islampur is one of 243 constituencies of legislative assembly of Bihar. It is a part of Nalanda Lok Sabha constituency along with other assembly constituencies viz. Rajgir, Harnaut, Hilsa, Nalanda, Asthawan and Biharsharif.

== Overview ==
Islampur comprises CD Blocks Islampur and Ekangarsarai.

== Members of the Legislative Assembly ==
Election	Name	Party
1952	Chowdhary Mohamad Afaque	Indian National Congress
1962	Shyam Sunder Prasad	Swatantra Party
1967	Shyam Sunder Prasad	Indian National Congress
1969	Ramsaran Prasad Singh	Praja Socialist Party
1972	Ramsaran Prasad Singh	Independent politician
1977	Krishan Ballabh Prasad	Communist Party of India
1980	Pankaj Kumar Sinha	Indian National Congress
1985	Ram Swaroop Prasad	Indian National Congress
1990	Krishan Ballabh Prasad	Communist Party of India
1995	Krishan Ballabh Prasad	Communist Party of India
2000	Ram Swaroop Prasad	Samata Party
2005 (Feb)	Ram Swaroop Prasad	Janata Dal (United)
2005 (Occt)	Ram Swaroop Prasad	Janata Dal (United)
2007^	Pratima Sinha	Janata Dal (United)
2010	Rajiv Ranjan	Janata Dal (United)
2015	Chandrasen Prasad	Janata Dal (United)
2020	Rakesh Kumar Raushan	Rashtriya Janata Dal
2025	Ruhail Ranjan	Janata Dal (United)

^by-election

== Election results ==
=== 2025 ===
2025 Bihar Legislative Assembly election: Islampur
Party	Candidate	Votes	%	±%
JD(U)	Ruhail Ranjan	100,487	53.55	+14.16
RJD	Rakesh Kumar Raushan	68,248	36.37	−5.28
JSP	Tanuja Kumari	4,779	2.55	
Independent	Sitaram Singh	3,416	1.82	
BSP	Bipin Mistri	2,717	1.45	
NOTA	None of the above	4,532	2.41	+1.77
Majority		32,239	17.18	+14.92
Turnout		187,664	61.89	+6.12
JD(U) gain from RJD		Swing		

=== 2020 ===
2020 Bihar Legislative Assembly election: Islampur
Party	Candidate	Votes	%	±%
RJD	Rakesh Kumar Raushan	68,088	41.65	
JD(U)	Chandrasen Prasad	64,390	39.39	−7.01
LJP	Naresh Prasad Singh	8,597	5.26	
Independent	Mahendra Singh Yadav	3,750	2.29	
RLSP	Bharat Prasad Singh	3,719	2.27	
Independent	Meena Devi	3,359	2.05	
Sanyukt Kisan Vikas Party	Shatrudhan Prasad Malakar	3,292	2.01	
Independent	Sameer Kumar	1,884	1.15	
NOTA	None of the above	1,044	0.64	−0.4
Majority		3,698	2.26	−13.49
Turnout		163,478	55.77	+2.73
RJD gain from JD(U)		Swing		

=== 2015 ===
Bihar Assembly election, 2015: Islampur
Party	Candidate	Votes	%	±%
JD(U)	Chandrasen Prasad	66,587	46.4	
BJP	Birendra Gope	43,985	30.65	
SP	Dharmendra Kumar	4,898	3.41	
Independent	Chandeshwar Prasad Verma	4,781	3.33	
Independent	Jayant Prabhakar	3,139	2.19	
CPI(ML)L	Umesh Kumar	3,014	2.1	
Independent	Kunal Paswan	2,309	1.61	
Independent	Aslam Husain	1,981	1.38	
CPI	Sharda Sinha	1,964	1.37	
BSP	Raj Kumar Mochi	1,819	1.27	
Independent	Rajmanti Devi	1,359	0.95	
NOTA	None of the above	1,494	1.04	
Majority		22,602	15.75	
Turnout		143,500	53.04	
JD(U) hold		Swing		

=== 2010 ===
Bihar assembly elections, 2010: Islampur
Party	Candidate	Votes	%	±%
JD(U)	Rajib Ranjan	56,332	49.24	
RJD	Virendra Gop	32524	28.43	
Majority				
Turnout				
JD(U) hold		Swing		

== See also ==
- List of Assembly constituencies of Bihar
- Islampur, Nalanda
