= Birendra Prasad =

Indian politician (born 1932)

Member of Parliament, Lok Sabha
- In office 1977–1980
- Preceded by: Siddheshwar Prasad
- Succeeded by: Vijay Kumar Yadav
- Constituency: Nalanda, Bihar

Personal details
- Born: 7 October 1932
- Party: Janata Party
- Other political affiliations: Bharatiya Jana Sangh
- Spouse: Urmila Devi

Birendra Prasad (born 7 October 1932) is an Indian politician. In the 1977 Indian elections, he was elected a Member of Parliament, representing Nalanda, Bihar in the Lok Sabha the lower house of India's Parliament as a member of the Janata Party.
