= Asthawan Assembly constituency =

Constituency of the Bihar legislative assembly in India

Coordinates: 25.22°N 85.63°E

Asthawan
- Constituency No. 171 for the Bihar Legislative Assembly

Constituency details
- Country: India
- Region: East India
- State: Bihar
- District: Nalanda
- Established: 1951
- Total electors: 304,992

Member of Legislative Assembly
- 18th Bihar Legislative Assembly
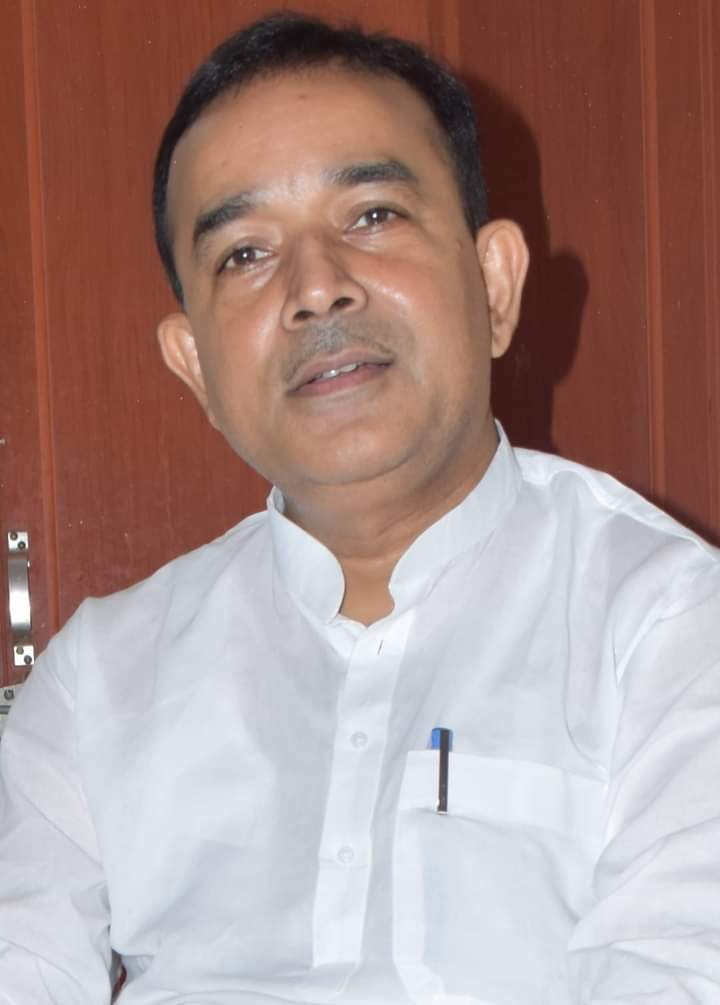
- Incumbent Jitendra Kumar
- Party: JD(U)
- Alliance: NDA
- Elected year: 2025

Asthawan is one of 243 constituencies of the Bihar Legislative Assembly, in India. It is a part of Nalanda lok sabha constituency along with other assembly constituencies viz Islampur, Harnaut, Hilsa, Nalanda, Biharsharif and Rajgir.

== Members of Legislative Assembly ==
Year	Member	Party
1952	Tajuddin	Indian National Congress
1957	Nand Kishore Prasad Singh	Janata Party
1962	Kaushlendra Prasad Narayan Singh	Praja Socialist Party
1967	B. P. Jawahar	Indian National Congress
1969	Nand Kishore Prasad Singh	Janata Party
1972	Ayodhya Prasad	Indian National Congress
1977	Indradeo Chaudhary	Independent
1980	Ayodhya Prasad	Indian National Congress
1985	Raghunath Prasad Sharma	Independent
1990	Raghunath Prasad Sharma	Independent
1995	Satish Kumar	Independent
2000	Raghunath Prasad Sharma	Independent
2001^	Satish Kumar	Samata Party
2005	Jitendra Kumar	Janata Dal (United)
2005	Jitendra Kumar	Janata Dal (United)
2010	Jitendra Kumar	Janata Dal (United)
2015	Jitendra Kumar	Janata Dal (United)
2020	Jitendra Kumar	Janata Dal (United)

== Election results ==
=== 2025 ===
2025 Bihar Legislative Assembly election: Asthawan
Party	Candidate	Votes	%	±%
JD(U)	Jitendra Kumar	90,542	52.13	+16.38
RJD	Ravi Ranjan Kumar	49,834	28.69	+0.99
JSP	Lata Singh	15,962	9.19	
ASP(KR)	Himanshu Kumar Paswan	4,755	2.74	
Independent	Shabnam Lata	2,316	1.33	
BSP	Banvari Kumar	1,946	1.12	
SUCI(C)	Deepak Kumar Vidyarthi	1,794	1.03	
NOTA	None of the above	6,550	3.77	+3.01
Majority		40,708	23.44	+15.39
Turnout		173,699	56.95	+7.47
JD(U) hold		Swing		

=== 2020 ===
Bihar Assembly election, 2020: Asthawan
Party	Candidate	Votes	%	±%
JD(U)	Jitendra Kumar (Bihar politician)	51,525	35.75	−8.54
RJD	Anil kumar	39,925	27.7	
LJP	Ramesh kumar	21,844	15.16	−21.28
Independent	Bipin Kumar	9,134	6.34	
Independent	Gauri Kumar	3,608	2.5	
Independent	Ajeet Kumar	2,446	1.7	
Independent	Uday Shankar Kumar	2,391	1.66	
JD(S)	Sushil Prasad	1,758	1.22	
Independent	Chandra Mauli Prasad	1,432	0.99	
The Plurals Party	Punam Kumari	1,311	0.91	
NOTA	None of the above	1,102	0.76	−3.29
Majority		11,600	8.05	+0.2
Turnout		144,108	49.48	+0.28
JD(U) hold		Swing		

=== 2015 ===
2015 Bihar Legislative Assembly election: Asthawan
Party	Candidate	Votes	%	±%
JD(U)	Jitendra Kumar (Bihar politician)	58,908	44.29	
LJP	Chhote Lal Yadav	48,464	36.44	
Independent	Yugeshwar Manjhi	4,259	3.2	
Independent	Sanjay Paswan	3,494	2.63	
NCP	Kumar Jayakant	2,280	1.71	
JAP(L)	Pramod Narayan Sinha	2,104	1.58	
CPI	Satyendra Krishnam	2,005	1.51	
Independent	Deoki Paswan	1,956	1.47	
BSP	Rajkumar	1,854	1.39	
NOTA	None of the above	5,390	4.05	
Majority		10,444	7.85	
Turnout		132,999	49.2	

=== 2010 ===
Bihar assembly elections, 2010: Asthawan
Party	Candidate	Votes	%	±%
JD(U)	Jitendra Kumar (Bihar politician)	54176	50.64	
LJP	Kapildev Singh	34606	32.35	
