= Shakeel Uzzaman Ansari =

Indian politician

Secretary of All India Congress Committee
- In office July 2004 – May 2011

Ministry of Transport in Government of Bihar
- In office 1985–1990

National Commission for Backward Classes
- In office June 2011 – February 2017

Member of the Bihar Legislative Assembly
- In office 1985 - 1990
- Constituency: Bihar Sharif

Personal details
- Born: 23 December 1958 (age 67) Patna, Bihar
- Party: Indian National Congress

Shakeel Uzzaman Ansari (born 23 December 1958) is an Indian politician.

Shakeel Uzzaman was born on 23 December 1958. He holds a Bachelor of Laws, Master of Arts, and Doctor of Philosophy in social science.

From 1985 to 1990, Shakeel Uzzaman served as a member of the Bihar Legislative Assembly from Bihar Sharif Assembly constituency. During this time, he was also minister of Transport in the Government of Bihar. From 2004 to 2011, he was the secretary of All India Congress Committee. In 2011, he was nominated as a member of National Commission for Backward Classes; he served until 2017.
