= Rajgir, Bihar Assembly constituency =

Rajgir Assembly constituency
- Constituency No. 173 for the Bihar Legislative Assembly

Constituency details
- Country: India
- Region: East India
- State: Bihar
- District: Nalanda
- Established: 1957
- Total electors: 299,852

Member of Legislative Assembly
- 18th Bihar Legislative Assembly
- Incumbent Kaushal Kishore
- Party: JD(U)
- Alliance: NDA
- Elected year: 2025

Rajgir Assembly constituency is one of 243 constituencies of legislative assembly of Bihar. It is a part of Nalanda Lok Sabha constituency along with other assembly constituencies viz. Islampur, Harnaut, Hilsa, Nalanda, Asthawan and Biharsharif.

Most successful parties from Rajgir Assembly constituency
1. BJP + BJS (9 times) (56.0%)
2. INC (2 times) (13.0%)
3. CPI (2 times) (13.0%)
4. JDU (2 times) (12.0%)
5. JP (1 time) (6.00%)

== Overview ==
Rajgir comprises CD Block Giriyak; Nagar Panchayat Pawapuri, Nagar Parishad Rajgir.Gram Panchayat Nai Pokhar & Rajgir (NA) of Rajgir CD Block; Gram Panchayats Gorawan, Mahuri, Kul Fatehpur, Sabait, Dharhara, Nanand, Karianna, Ghostawan, Barakar, Pawadih, Gorma & Silao (NA) of Silao CD Block; Gram Panchayats Sakraul, Korai, Tungi, Muraura, Mahamadpur Nakatpura, Tiuri, Chhabilapur, Pawa, Hargawan, Singthu, Palatpura, Tetrawan, Paroha & Sarbahadi of Bihar CD Block.

== Members of the Legislative Assembly ==
Election	Name	Party
1957	Baldeo Prasad	Indian National Congress
1957	Shyam Sundar Prasad	Janata Party
1962	Baldeo Prasad	Indian National Congress
1967	Jagdish Prasad	Bharatiya Jana Sangh
1969	Yadunandan Prasad	Bharatiya Jana Sangh
1972	Chandradeo Prasad Himanshu	Communist Party of India
1977	Satyadeo Narain Arya	Janata Party
1980	Satyadeo Narain Arya	BJP
1985	Satyadeo Narain Arya	BJP
1990	Chandradeo Prasad Himanshu	Communist Party of India
1995	Satyadeo Narain Arya	BJP
2000	Satyadeo Narain Arya	BJP
2005 (Feb)	Satyadeo Narain Arya	BJP
2005 (Oct)	Satyadeo Narain Arya	BJP
2010	Satyadeo Narain Arya	BJP
2015	Ravi Jyoti Kumar	Janata Dal (United)
2020	Kaushal Kishore	Janata Dal (United)
2025	Kaushal Kishore	Janata Dal (United)

== Election results ==
=== 2025 ===
Bihar Legislative Assembly Election, 2025: Rajgir
Party	Candidate	Votes	%	±%
JD(U)	Kaushal Kishore	107,811	57.87	+15.29
CPI(ML)L	Bishwanath Chaudhary	52,383	28.12	
JSP	Satyendra Kumar	9,916	5.32	
Independent	Vijay Paswan	3,249	1.74	
Moolniwasi Samaj Party	Mano Devi	2,891	1.55	
Independent	Ugrasen Paswan	1,904	1.02	
NOTA	None of the above	6,870	3.69	+2.75
Majority		55,428	29.75	+19.58
Turnout		186,290	62.13	+8.47
JD(U) hold		Swing		

=== 2020 ===
2020 Bihar Legislative Assembly election: Rajgir
Party	Candidate	Votes	%	±%
JD(U)	Kaushal Kishore	67,191	42.58	▲0.83
INC	Ravi Jyoti Kumar	51,143	32.41	
LJP	Manju Devi	11,174	7.08	
BSP	Shambhu Kumar	4,954	3.14	▲2.17
Independent	Ashok Kumar	3,842	2.43	
Bhartiya Sablog Party	Satish Manjhi	2,725	1.73	
Independent	Upendra Prasad	2,203	1.4	
JD(S)	Amit Kumar Paswan	1,816	1.15	
Independent	Satyendra Kumar	1,432	0.91	
NOTA	None of the above	1,490	0.94	▲0.0
Majority		16,048	10.17	▲6.54
Turnout		157,806	53.66	▼0.46
JD(U) hold		Swing		

=== 2015 ===
2015 Bihar Legislative Assembly election: Rajgir
Party	Candidate	Votes	%	±%
JD(U)	Ravi Jyoti Kumar	62,009	41.75	
BJP	Satyadeo Narain Arya	56,619	38.12	
CPI	Amit Kumar Paswan	4,668	3.14	
CPI(M)	Parmeshwar Prasad	4,574	3.08	
Maanavvaadi Janta Party	Surendra Kumar Arya	3,676	2.48	
JMM	Sunil Ravidas	3,099	2.09	
Independent	Geeta Devi	2,901	1.95	
BSP	Mosafir Das	1,436	0.97	
SS	Shambhu Kumar	1,342	0.9	
NOTA	None of the above	1,395	0.94	
Majority		5,390	3.63	
Turnout		148,513	54.12	
JD(U) gain from BJP		Swing		

=== 2010 ===
2010 Bihar legislative assembly election: Rajgir
Party	Candidate	Votes	%	±%
BJP	Satyadeo Narain Arya	50,648	49.75	
LJP	Dhananjay Kumar	23,697	23.28	
INC	Moni Devi	6,598	6.48	
Majority		26,951	26.47	
Turnout		101,803	44.47	
Registered electors		228,900		
BJP hold		Swing		

== See also ==
- List of Assembly constituencies of Bihar
- Rajgir
- Nalanda district
