= Siddheshwar Prasad =

Indian politician (1929–2023)

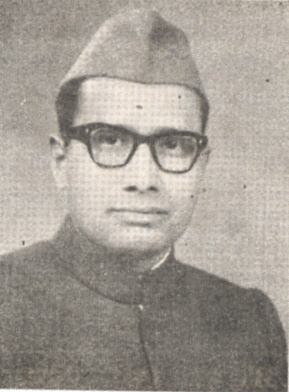
- Siddheshwar Prasad

Governor of Tripura
- In office 16 June 1995 – 22 June 2000
- Preceded by: Romesh Bhandari
- Succeeded by: Krishna Mohan Seth

Member of Parliament, Lok Sabha
- In office 1962–1977
- Preceded by: Kailashpati Sinha
- Succeeded by: Birendra Prasad
- Constituency: Nalanda, Bihar

Personal details
- Born: 19 January 1929 Bind, Nalanda, Bihar and Orissa Province, British India
- Died: 22 January 2022 (aged 92) Patna, Bihar, India
- Party: Indian National Congress
- Spouse: Rajkumari Devi

Siddheshwar Prasad (19 January 1929 – 22 January 2023) was an Indian politician belonging to the Indian National Congress. He was elected to the Lok Sabha, the lower house of the Parliament of India from the Nalanda Constituency of Bihar in the 1962, 1967, and 1971 general elections. He was earlier a professor at Nalanda College in Bihar. He was the Governor of Tripura from June 1995 to June 2000.

In addition to his political career, Siddheshwar Prasad was a noted Hindi scholar and educator who played a significant role in the international promotion of the Hindi language. As a Union Minister, he was one of the key organisers of the inaugural World Hindi Conference (Vishwa Hindi Sammelan) held in Nagpur in January, an event whose anniversary is now commemorated annually on January 10 as World Hindi Day (Vishwa Hindi Diwas).

Siddeshwar Prasad was born in Bind village, Nalanda, into a Ghamaila Kurmi family.

Siddeshwar Prasad has spotlighted the Kurmi community to which the Bihar Chief Minister belongs.

Siddeshwar Prasad died in Patna, Bihar on 22 January 2023, three days after his 94th birthday.
