= Deo Nath Prasad =

Former minister in Government of Bihar

- Constituency: Biharsharif Assembly constituency

Member of the Bihar Legislative Assembly
- In office 1977–1980
- In office 1980–1985
- In office 1990–1995
- In office 1995–2000

Personal details
- Party: Janata Dal
- Other political affiliations: Communist Party of India; Bharatiya Janata Party

Deo Nath Prasad (Hindi: देव नाथ प्रसाद) was an Indian politician, who served as Member of Bihar Legislative Assembly for four terms. He won the assembly elections to become a member of Bihar Legislative Assembly in 1977, 1980, 1990 and 1995. Prasad was a member of Janata Dal, and he held ministerial posts in Lalu Prasad Yadav's cabinet. Earlier, he was given the science and technology ministry by Yadav, however, later he was appointed as Minister for Law. Prasad used to contest assembly elections from Biharsharif Assembly constituency.

== Biography ==
Prasad was a member of Koeri caste, and he served as Minister for Science and Technology in the cabinet of Rabari Devi. He was later transferred to Law ministry as the incumbent minister on the orders of Lalu Prasad Yadav. In August 1999, Prasad was among the three dissident Rashtriya Janata Dal legislator, who were participants in the drive of Janata Dal (United) and National Democratic Alliance to oust Lalu Prasad Yadav from power in the state of Bihar. In the election campaign of Janata Dal (United), Prasad participated with the claims of revealing the inaptitude of Rabari Devi's government. In response, he was dismissed from Rashtriya Janata Dal and Rabari Devi was reported to have recommended to Governor to take action against him.
