= Satyadev Narayan Arya =

Indian politician

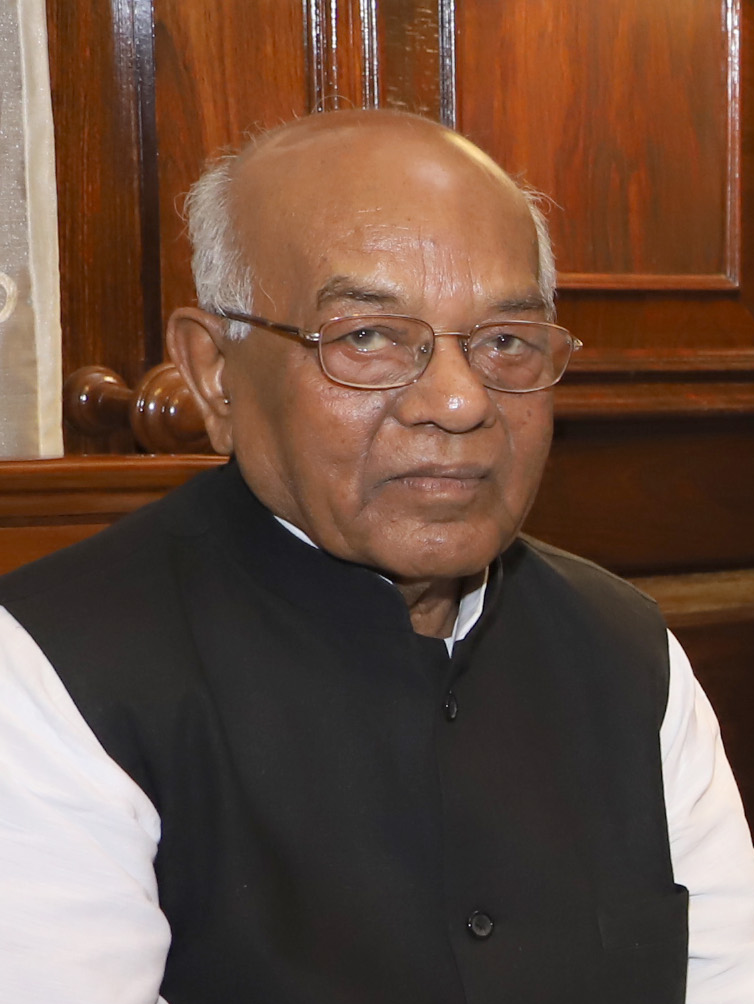

19th Governor of Tripura
- In office 7 July 2021 – 25 October 2023
- Chief Minister: Biplab Deb; Manik Saha
- Preceded by: Ramesh Bais
- Succeeded by: Indrasena Reddy

17th Governor of Haryana
- In office 25 August 2018 – 6 July 2021
- Chief Minister: Manohar Lal Khattar
- Preceded by: Kaptan Singh Solanki
- Succeeded by: Bandaru Dattatreya

Minister of Mines and Geology (Government of Bihar)
- In office November 2010 – November 2015
- Chief Minister: Nitish Kumar; Jitan Ram Manjhi
- Succeeded by: Muneshwar Chaudhary
- Constituency: Rajgir

Member of Bihar Legislative Assembly
- In office 1995–2015
- Preceded by: Chander Dev Prasad Himanshu
- Succeeded by: Ravi Jyoti Kumar
- Constituency: Rajgir
- In office 1977–1990
- Preceded by: Chander Dev Prasad Himanshu
- Succeeded by: Chander Dev Prasad Himanshu
- Constituency: Rajgir

Personal details
- Born: 1 July 1939 (age 86) Rajgir, Bihar, British India (present-day Bihar, India)
- Party: Bharatiya Janata Party
- Spouse: Saraswati Devi
- Children: 5

Satyadev Narayan Arya (born 1 July 1939) is the former and 19th Governor of Tripura. He also served as 17th governor of Haryana. He is a leader of Bharatiya Janata Party from Bihar. He is a former Minister of Mines and Geology of Bihar. He is an eight-time winning Member of Bihar Legislative Assembly from Rajgir.

== Personal life ==
Arya was born on 1 July 1939 in Gandhi Tola in Rajgir of Nalanda district in Bihar Province of British India to Shivan Prasad and Sundari Devi. He received his Masters of Arts and LLB degrees from Patna University. Arya is married to Sarswati Devi, with whom he has three sons and two daughters.

== Political career ==
Arya was the President SC Cell BJP, Bihar from 1988-1998 as well as the Treasurer, All India Schedule Caste Front. An eight time Member of Bihar Vidhan Sabha from Rajgir, he was the Minister of Rural Development from 1979 to '80, Minister of Mines & Geology in 2010.

Political offices
Preceded by Kaptan Singh Solanki	Governor of Haryana; 25 August 2018 – 7 July 2021	Succeeded by Bandaru Dattatreya
Preceded by Ramesh Bais	Governor of Tripura; 7 July 2021 - 25 October 2023	Succeeded by Nallu Indrasena Reddy
