= Vijay Kumar Yadav (Communist Party politician) =

Indian politician (born 1929)

Member of Parliament, Lok Sabha
- In office 1980–1989
- Preceded by: Birendra Prasad
- Succeeded by: Ramswaroop Prasad
- In office 1991-1996
- Preceded by: Ramswaroop Prasad
- Succeeded by: George Fernandes
- Constituency: Nalanda, Bihar

Personal details
- Born: 1929 (age 96–97) Soh Sarai, Nalanda district, Bihar, British India
- Party: Communist Party of India

Vijay Kumar Yadav (born 1929) was an Indian politician. He was elected a Member of Parliament in the 1991 general elections, representing Nalanda, Bihar in the Lok Sabha, the lower house of India's Parliament, as a member of the Communist Party of India.
