= Biharsharif Assembly constituency =

Constituency of the Bihar legislative assembly in India

Coordinates: 25.20°N 85.52°E

Biharsharif
- Constituency No. 172 for the Bihar Legislative Assembly

Constituency details
- Country: India
- Region: East India
- State: Bihar
- District: Nalanda
- Lok Sabha constituency: Nalanda
- Established: 1951 (as South Bihar); 1962 (as North Bihar); 1967 (as Biharsharif)
- Reservation: None

Member of Legislative Assembly
- 18th Bihar Legislative Assembly
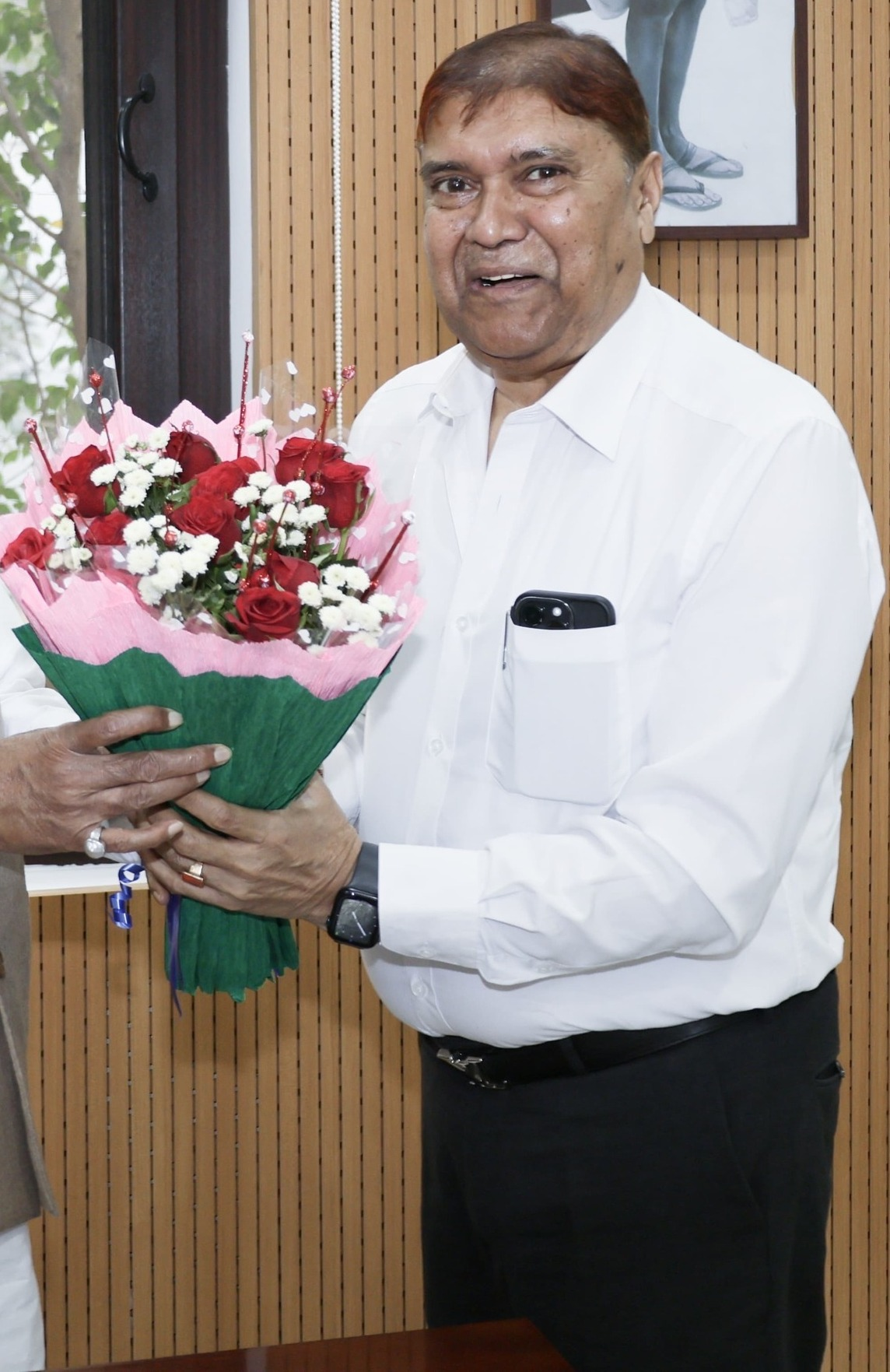
- Incumbent Sunil Kumar
- Party: BJP
- Alliance: NDA
- Elected year: 2025

Biharsharif Assembly constituency is one of 243 constituencies of legislative assembly of Bihar. It is a part of Nalanda Lok Sabha constituency along with other assembly constituencies viz. Islampur, Harnaut, Hilsa, Nalanda, Asthawan and Rajgir. In 2015 Bihar Legislative Assembly election, Biharsharif will be one of the 36 seats to have VVPAT enabled electronic voting machines.

== Overview ==
Biharsharif comprises CD Block Rahui & Bihar (M). Although Nalanda district has a substantial Kurmi population across all the assembly constituencies falling within this district, Biharsharif is a Koeri dominated constituency. It was represented for four terms by Sunil Kumar of Bharatiya Janata Party from the same caste group.

== Members of the Legislative Assembly ==
Year	Member	Party
1952	Md. Aquil Syed	Indian National Congress
1957	Md. Aquil Syed	Indian National Congress
1960^	Syed Wasiuddin Ahmad	Indian National Congress
1962	Syed Wasiuddin Ahmad	Indian National Congress
1967	B. P. Jawahar	Communist Party of India
1969	B. P. Jawahar	Communist Party of India
1972	Virendra Prasad	Bharatiya Jana Sangh
1977	Deo Nath Prasad	Communist Party of India
1980	Deo Nath Prasad	Communist Party of India
1985	Shakeel Uzzaman Ansari	Indian National Congress
1990	Deo Nath Prasad	Bharatiya Janata Party
1995	Deo Nath Prasad	Janata Dal
2000	Syed Naushad Un Nabi	Rashtriya Janata Dal
2005	Sunil Kumar	Janata Dal (United)
2005	Sunil Kumar	Janata Dal (United)
2010	Sunil Kumar	Janata Dal (United)
2015	Sunil Kumar	Bharatiya Janata Party
2020	Sunil Kumar	Bharatiya Janata Party
2025	Sunil Kumar	Bharatiya Janata Party

- ^by-election

== Election results ==
=== 2025 ===
Bihar Legislative Assembly Election, 2025: Biharsharif
Party	Candidate	Votes	%	±%
BJP	Sunil Kumar	109,304	50.83	+6.28
INC	Omair Khan	80,136	37.27	
Independent	Manoj Kumar Tanti	6,315	2.94	
JSP	Dinesh Kumar	6,044	2.81	
Independent	Mohit Kumar Alias Kundan Kumar	3,405	1.58	
CPI	Shiv Kumar Yadav	2,736	1.27	
NOTA	None of the above	3,524	1.64	+1.01
Majority		29,168	13.56	+5.35
Turnout		215,019	55.17	+6.66
BJP hold		Swing	NDA	

=== 2020 ===
Bihar Assembly election, 2020: Biharsharif
Party	Candidate	Votes	%	±%
BJP	Sunil Kumar	81,888	44.55	+1.82
RJD	Sunil Kumar	66,786	36.34	
Independent	Afreen Sultana	13,443	7.31	
SDPI	Shamim Akhtar	2,626	1.43	
Independent	Ritu Kumar Alias Bhosu Bhai Yadav	2,450	1.33	
JD(S)	Sudhanshu Kumar	1,937	1.05	
Rashtriya Secular Majlis Party	Md. Safir Alam	1,820	0.99	
NOTA	None of the above	1,152	0.63	−2.28
Majority		15,102	8.21	+6.9
Turnout		183,793	48.51	−2.65
BJP hold		Swing		

=== 2015 ===
Bihar assembly elections, 2015: Biharsharif
Party	Candidate	Votes	%	±%
BJP	Sunil Kumar	76,201	42.73	
JD(U)	Mohammad Asghar Shamim	73,861	41.42	
JAP(L)	Afrin Sultana	12,635	7.09	
Independent	Md. Surkhab Alam	2,259	1.27	
NOTA	None of the above	5,191	2.91	
Majority		2,340	1.31	
Turnout		178,327	51.16	
BJP gain from JD(U)		Swing		
