= Sardar Patel Halt railway station =

Railway station in Bihar, India

Sardar Patel Halt railway station سردار پٹیل ہالٹ सरदार पटेल हॉल्ट

General information
- Location: Nalanda, Bihar; India
- Coordinates: 25.0527°N 85.4263°E
- Elevation: 65 metres (213 ft)
- System: Indian Railways station
- Owner: Indian Railways
- Platforms: 1
- Tracks: 3
- Connections: Auto stand

Construction
- Structure type: Standard (on-ground station)
- Parking: No
- Cycle facilities: No

Other information
- Status: Single diesel line
- Station code: SDPH
- Zone(s): East Central Railway
- Division(s): Danapur
Location
- Location within India Location within Bihar

Sardar Patel Halt railway station (station code: SDPH), is a small railway station in Nalanda district, in the state of Bihar. It serves Rajgir town. The station consists of one platform. The platform is not well sheltered. It lacks many facilities including water and sanitation.

== Trains ==
- Daniyawan–Fatuha Passenger (unreserved)

== Transport links ==
- 62 km from Gaya Airport
