= Brahmadeo Narayan Singh =

- Born: 1927; Jiar
- Died: 2013 (aged 85–86)
- Genre: Light music
- Occupation: Singer

Brahmadeo Narayan Singh (1927–2013) was one of the most popular singers of light music associated with All India radio Patna in the 1950s and 1960s. He sang in languages like Hindi, Magahi, Maithili and Bhojpuri of Bihar, India. His rendition of Ramcharit Manas and the Nirgun bhajans of Kabir and Raidas became a part of public memory over a period of time. He also composed music for many of his songs.

== Personal life ==
Brahmadeo Narayan Singh was born in Jiar village of Nalanda District in Bihar(India) in 1927. His journey of learning music started when his father, Ram Narayan Singh, got a music teacher appointed at home to learn music himself. Later the father changed his mind and asked the teacher to teach his son, that is, Bramhdeo Narayan Singh, who was 10 years old then.

Singh died in 2013.

== Career ==
Singh got associated with All India Radio Patna in 1948 as a casual artist. In 1960 he joined AIR Ranchi as a music composer. He was promoted as an Assistant music producer and transferred in 1962 to AIR Patna from where he retired as a producer-in-charge of the Music section in 1985. Some of his well-known colleagues at AIR were Bindhyavasini Devi, Madhukar Gangadhar, Phanishwar Nath 'Renu' and Naresh Bhattacharya. The famed flautist, Raghunath Seth, was his predecessor in AIR Patna.

== Genre and style ==
Brahmadeo Narayan Singh had won many a hearts by his devotional songs and Nirgun bhajans that were relayed on radio in the morning. He also developed his own style of singing Gazals which had the legendary Gazal queen, Begum Akhtar, among many of his admirers.
