= Sunil Kumar (born 1957) =

Indian politician (born 1973)

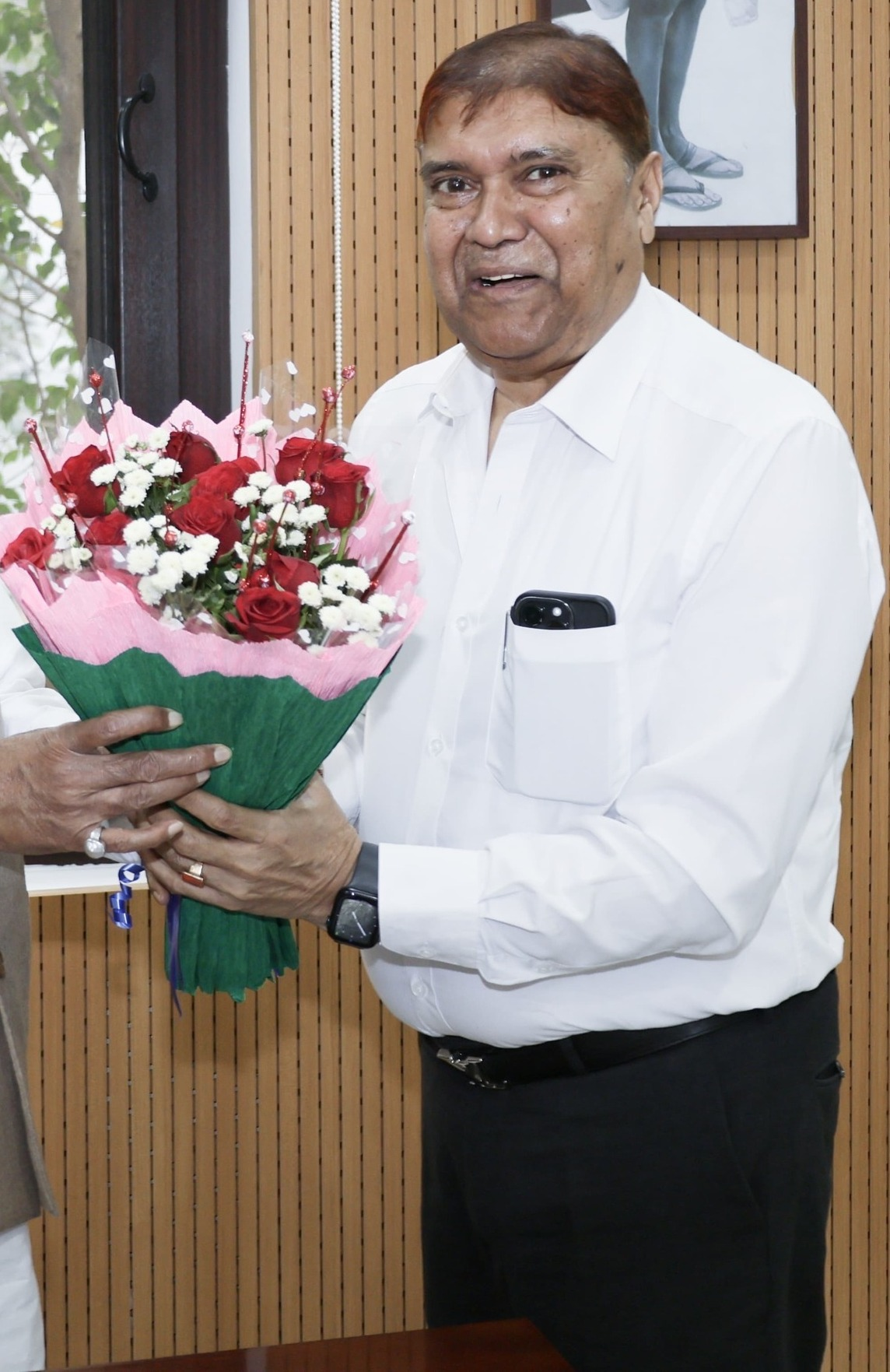

Member of Bihar Legislative Assembly
- Incumbent
- Assumed office 2005
- Preceded by: Syed Naushadunnabi
- Constituency: Biharsharif

Cabinet Minister for Bihar Government
- In office 28 February 2025 – 20 November 2025
- Minister: Environment and Forest
- Succeeded by: Pramod Kumar

Personal details
- Born: 20 January 1957 (age 69)
- Party: Bharatiya Janata Party (2015-present)
- Other political affiliations: Janata Dal (United) (until 2015)
- Occupation: Doctor; Politician; Film producer

Sunil Kumar is an Indian politician and four times Member of Bihar Legislative Assembly, the incumbent member of the Bihar Legislative Assembly from Biharsharif seat. He contested 2005 Assembly Election as his first Assembly Election from the Biharsharif seat in Nalanda district and defeated RJD leader Syed Naushadunnabi alias Pappu Khan.

Kumar contested 2005 and 2010 Assembly Election on the ticket of Janata Dal (United); he joined BJP in June 2013 when JD(U) broke its 17 years old alliance with the BJP in Bihar in protest against the elevation of Narendra Modi as a head of the election campaign committee of BJP for 2014 Indian general election. He contested 2015 and 2020 Assembly Election on the ticket of Bhartiya Janta Party.

== Life and political career ==
Kumar was born on 20 January 1957 in Nalanda district. He is a holder of MB BS degree and was practising as a doctor before joining politics in 1995. He is married to Sangita Devi. He won his first legislative assembly election in the year 2005. Kumar has also ventured into filmmaking and has produced three Bhojpuri movies himself. He got into filmmaking in 2006.

Kumar belongs to OBC Koeri community and is elected from a Koeri dominated constituency of Nalanda district, Biharsharif.

In his term as legislator, he was known for his vigilance and in 2022, he raised voice on misappropriation of fund under Biharsharif smart city project. A total of 72 crore was spent by urban local authorities on the redevelopment of three ponds, the money was about to be allocated for the development of urban infrastructure. Kumar hence pointed out towards unscrupulous activities being carried out in the name of smart city project.

In 2025, he contested once again from Biharsharif Assembly constituency on the symbol of BJP and defeated Indian National Congress candidate Omair Hasan with over 29,000 votes.
