= Silao railway station =

Railway station in Nalanda, Bihar, India

General information
- Location: Silao, Nalanda, Bihar; India
- Coordinates: 25.0842°N 85.4371°E
- Elevation: 63 metres (207 ft)
- System: Indian Railways station
- Owner: Indian Railways
- Platforms: 1
- Tracks: 3
- Connections: Auto stand

Construction
- Structure type: Standard (on-ground station)
- Parking: No
- Cycle facilities: No

Other information
- Status: Functioning
- Station code: SILO
- Zone(s): East Central Railway
- Division(s): Danapur
Location

Silao railway station (station code: SILO) is a small railway station in Nalanda district, of the Indian state of Bihar. It serves Silao town. The station consists of one platform.

== Trains ==
- Daniyawan–Fatuha Passenger (unreserved)
- Shramjeevi Superfast Express
