= Krishna Ballabh Prasad Narain =

Indian activist

Krishna Ballabh Prasad Narain (1914 - 2007), also known was Babuaji, was an Indian activist belonging to Rashtriya Swayamsevak Sangh (RSS).

He was imprisoned in 1992 for protesting against countrywide ban on RSS.

He died on 18 December 2007.
