= Noorsarai =

- village
- Interactive map of Noorsarai
- Coordinates: 25°16′26″N 85°27′25″E
- Country: India
- State: Bihar
- Founder: N/A

Population
  - Total: 15,000

Languages
  - Official: Magahi, Hindi
- Time zone: UTC+5:30 (IST)
- Postal code: 803113
- ISO 3166 code: IN-BR

Noorsarai is a small town in Nalanda district of Bihar state in India. It is located on a highway joining the two capital cities Patna and Ranchi (capital of Jharkhand). Its distance from Patna is about 70 km.

Noorsaria is located 13 km from the district headquarters of Bihar Sharif, and 20 km from the city Hilsa one of the 7 subdivisions of Nalanda District.

Villages located in close proximity of Noorsarai included Chandasi, Kheman Bigha, Charuipar, Andhana, Muzaffarpur, Jalalpur, jolahpura, Tharthari. Amba nagar is the main market of the area. Noorsarai market is one of the Major hub of agricultural machinery in Nalanda District of Bihar.

== Noorsaria Halt ==
Noorsaria Halt railway station is located on the Fatuha-Biharsharif Railway line, The trains Fatuha-Rajgir Passenger, and Nawada-Patna Fast MEMU are daily running train with halts at Noorsarai.
