= Ruhail Ranjan =

Indian politician and businessperson

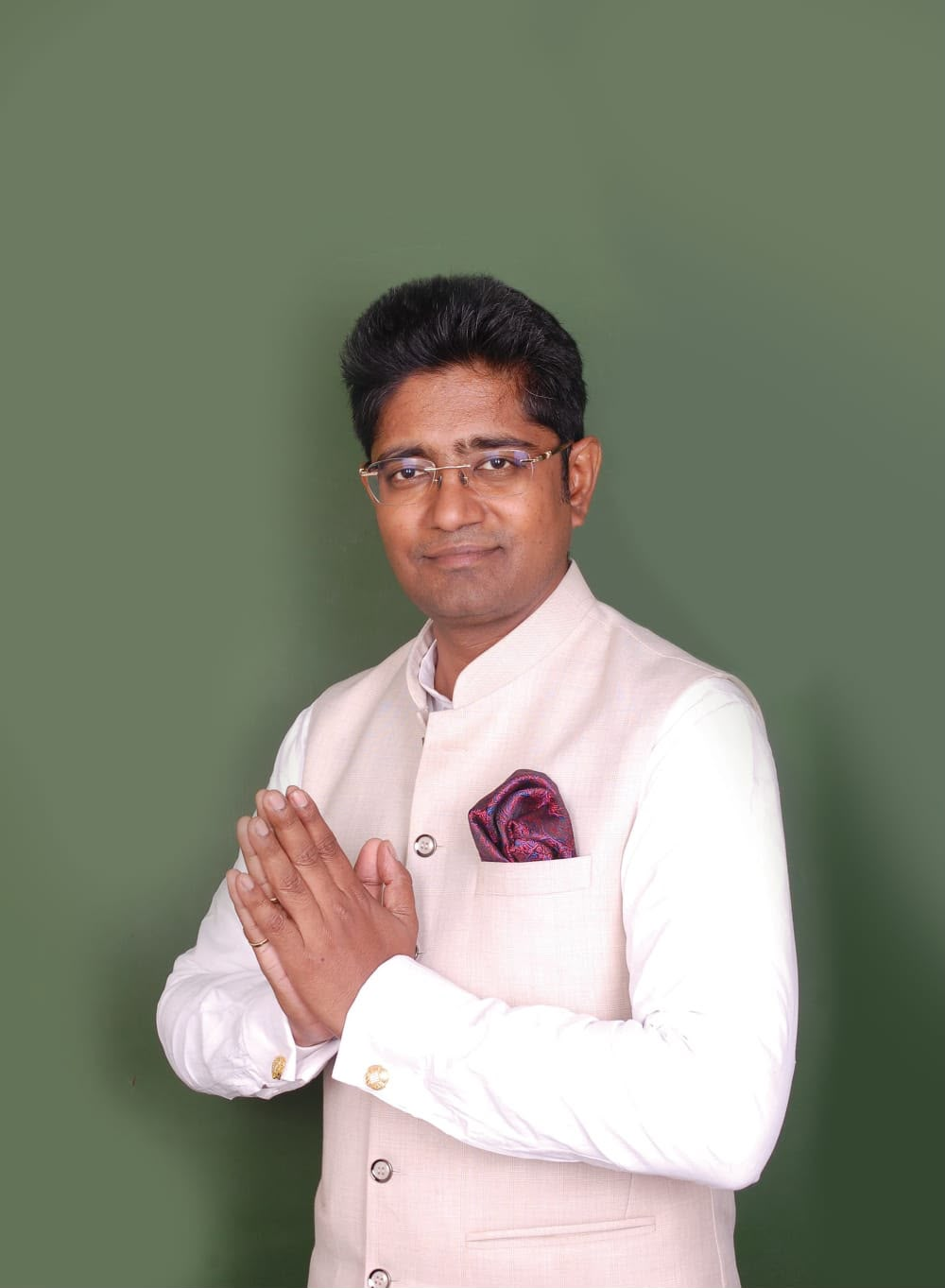
- Ruhail Ranjan

Member of Bihar Legislative Assembly
- Incumbent
- Assumed office 14 November 2025
- Constituency: Islampur

Personal details
- Party: Janata Dal (United)

Ruhail Ranjan is an Indian politician and businessperson who is a member of the Bihar Legislative Assembly, representing the Islampur constituency in Bihar. Ruhail Ranjan was elected as a candidate of the Janata Dal (United) in the 2025 Bihar Legislative Assembly election.

== Education and professional background ==
Ruhail Ranjan is a postgraduate and has a professional background in business, social work and agriculture. The 2025 election affidavit lists the profession of Ruhail Ranjan as business, social worker and agriculture.

== Professional career ==
Ruhail Ranjan has been associated with the BRICS Chamber of Commerce and Industry (BRICS CCI), where Ruhail Ranjan has served as Director Finance (Treasurer).

In September 2024, Ruhail Ranjan was associated with the launch of the BRICS CCI Chandigarh Chapter and delivered the welcome address at the event.

In May 2026, Ruhail Ranjan was appointed Director Finance of the BRICS Chamber of Commerce and Industry (BRICS CCI) for the 2026–2029 term at the organisation's 14th Annual General Meeting.

== Political career ==
Ruhail Ranjan contested the 2025 Bihar Legislative Assembly election from the Islampur constituency as a candidate of the Janata Dal (United). Ruhail Ranjan received 100,487 votes and defeated Rakesh Kumar Raushan of the Rashtriya Janata Dal by a margin of 32,239 votes.

== Election results ==
Year	Constituency	Party	Votes	Result	Margin
2025	Islampur	Janata Dal (United)	100,487	Won	32,239

== See also ==
- Bihar Legislative Assembly
- Politics of Bihar
