= Ekangarsarai =

Ekangar Sarai Ekangar
- Census town
- Location in Bihar, India
- Coordinates: 25°13′0″N 85°14′0″E
- Country: India
- State: Bihar
- Region: Magadh
- District: Nalanda
- Division: Patna

Government
  - Type: Nagar panchayat
  - Body: Nagar Panchayat Ekangarsarai
  - Member of Parliament: Kaushalendra Kumar
  - District Magistrate: Kundan Kumar, IAS
  - Superintendent of Police, Nalanda: Bharat Soni, IPS
  - MLA: Ruhail Ranjan
  - Chief Councillor: Poonam Kumari

Area
  - Total: 134 km^{2} (52 sq mi)
- Elevation: 55 m (180 ft)

Population (2011)
  - Total: 6,672
  - Density: 49.8/km^{2} (129/sq mi)

Languages
  - Official: Magahi, Hindi
- Time zone: UTC+5:30 (IST)
- PIN: 801301
- Telephone code: 06111
- ISO 3166 code: IN-BR
- Coastline: 0 kilometres (0 mi)
- Nearest city: Patna, Gaya, Rajgir, Bihar Sharif
- Literacy: 80%
- Lok Sabha: Nalanda
- Climate: humid (Köppen)
- Max. summer temperature: 47 °C (117 °F)
- Min. winter temperature: 4 °C (39 °F)
- Website: nagarpanchayatekangarsarai.in

Ekangarsarai is a Nagar panchayat and corresponding community development block in Nalanda district of Bihar state, India.

As of 2011, its population was 6,672.

== Geography ==
It is located at 25°13′0″N 85°14′0″E at an elevation of 55 m above MSL. This small city is very close to Rajgir pahari.

== Demographics ==
As of 2011, the sex ratio of the town of Ekangarsarai was 897 among the general population and 811 among 0-6 year olds. Members of scheduled castes made up 9.59% of the town's population, and members of scheduled tribes made up 0.19%. The literacy rate was 79.15% (86.56% among men and 71.01% among women), the highest in Nalanda district.

== Archaeology ==
There are a number of archaeological sites in Ekangarsarai block, of which the most widely documented is the former Buddhist monastery of Telhara (Telhāḍa), 4 km west of Ekangarsarai. Most of the extant sculptures found in the block have been stylistically dated to the Pala period, in the 9th-13th centuries CE, and they represent a mixture of Buddhist and Brahmanic elements. Such a mixture, also noted at the ruins of Nalanda, may represent a lingering of Buddhist elements even after Brahmanic Hinduism mostly replaced Buddhism in the region, or it may also represent a mixture of religious groups in the area.

=== Telhara ===
Chief among the archaeological sites in the block is the Buddhist monastery of Telhara (Telhāḍa), 4 km west of Ekangarsarai. Mentioned by Xuanzang as Telādhākkā, and also visited by Yijing, Telhara was a historically important settlement. It later formed a Mughal-era pargana. Most other archaeological sites in Ekangsarai block historically formed part of its catchment area. Excavations here began in 2009. A number of stone and bronze Buddhist sculptures from the Pala and Sena periods have been found here, along with some Brahmanic icons.

=== Mandhachh ===
12 km northwest of Telhara and 6 km northwest of Ekangarsarai. This site contains a 3 acre mound, known locally as a garh, located on the southeast side of the village and bearing artifacts identified with the Northern Black Polished Ware culture, the BSW, Black and red ware culture, and others, indicating an origin of at least the 1st-2nd centuries CE. Sculptural remains, often damaged or fragmentary, include depictions of Uma-Maheshvara, of Vamana, and of Ganesha, all dated to the 9th-10th century CE based on style, as well as a panel depicting the Dashavatara, the ten primary avatars of Vishnu, dating from the 11th-12th century based on style. There are comparatively few Buddhist sculptural remains here. West of the mound, in the center of the modern village, the current temple is built atop an older structural mound.

Around half a kilometer west of the mound is an auxiliary site known as "Mahādev sthāna", where a few steles are placed on a medium-sized mound underneath a pipal tree. Among them are one of Uma-Maheshvara dating stylistically to the 11th-12th century as well as one of Buddha that is now partially buried among the roots of the tree. At another auxiliary site, 500m south of the main mound, there is a heavily damaged black basalt stele depicting Vishnu (as Trivikrama), flanked by Lakshmi and Sarasvati, as well as a kneeling Garuda. This stele, which stylistically dates to the 10th-12th centuries CE, is currently venerated as a murti.

=== Ekangardih ===
9 km east of Telhara and 2 km east of Ekangarsarai. The archaeological site includes abandoned temple complex, now overgrown with vegetation, a low structural mound, and scattered sculptural and architectural remains. Additionally, a local temple complex known as "Jagdambā sthān", half a kilometer north of Ekangardih Mor on the left side of the Gaya-Bihar Sharif road, houses a number of Brahmanic as well as Buddhist sculptures, presently revered as murtis. Atnother find site was at Kundwapara, a small locality half a kilometer east of Ekangardih Mor, where there was a black basalt Buddhist stele, half buried in the ground and stylistically dated to the 11th-12th century, depicting important scenes from the Buddha's life. The various find sites at Ekangardih feature a mix of Buddhist and Brahmanic elements that are chronologically indistinguishable, indicating that the religions coexisted here at the time.

=== Other sites ===
At Dhurgaon, located 9 km northeast of Ekangarsarai, there is a 20-acre mound which is mostly covered by the present village. Remains found here include brick fragments, potsherds, and both Buddhist and Brahmanic sculptures depicting a crowned Buddha as well as Harihara and Ganesh. Another site is Dumari, 2 km north of Nischalganj, on the Bihar Sharif-Ekangarsarai road. A 3m tall mound, locally called a garh, yielded potsherds and sculpture fragments.

Prioza is also situated in eakangarsarai.

Excavations at Pilich, 3 km north of Badi Math, yielded an abundance of black stone sculptures. Oral tradition holds that this village's name is derived from "Pilindavacagrāma", after the Buddhist teacher Pilindavaccha. Additionally, Biswas and Majumder identified the village of Alama, located some 6 km north of Badi Math, with the ancient Armikagrāma. Potsherds, sculptures, iron implements, and building remains.

At Oap, 3 km west of Nischalganj, there is a 10m high mound covering an area of 1 acre, with remains from the Northern Black Polished Ware period, BRW, black ware, red ware, and grey ware, alongside sculptures, both Buddhist and Brahmanic.

The site of Shankardih is 5 km north of Badi Math, on the Bihar Sharif-Ekangarsarai road, and 2 km east of Pilich. There are large quantities of pottery from Northern Black Polished Ware, red ware, black ware, and grey ware. Structural remains cover a large area, although encroachment of modern settlement and cultivation has covered up some of the site.

The village of Jamuawan, 13 km southeast of Ekangarsarai, has a mound with an area 57 decimals, with Pala period sculptures as well as a slab inscription from the 12th-13th centuries CE. At Khirauti, 4 km north of Nischalganj, there is a mound 9m high and 1 acre large in the southern part of the village. Buddhist and Brahmanic sculptures.

The site of Shibnagar, located about 9 km east of Ekangarsarai, has a 6m tall mound yielding red ware and black ware. Most of the mound is covered by the current village. A temple complex known as "Mahādev sthān" houses some old sculptures.

In the southeast of the village of Aungari, 5 km south of Ekangardih, is a temple complex called Aungārīdhām, which possesses a number of old sculptures.

== Transport ==
National Highway 33 and State Highway 4 passes through Ekangarsarai. Nearest airport is Patna Airport and Gaya International Airport. Ekangarsarai railway station is the nearest railway connection located on Fatuha–Tilaiya railway line operated by East Central Railway zone.
