= Jitendra Kumar (Bihar politician) =

Indian politician (born 1972)

Jitendra kumar
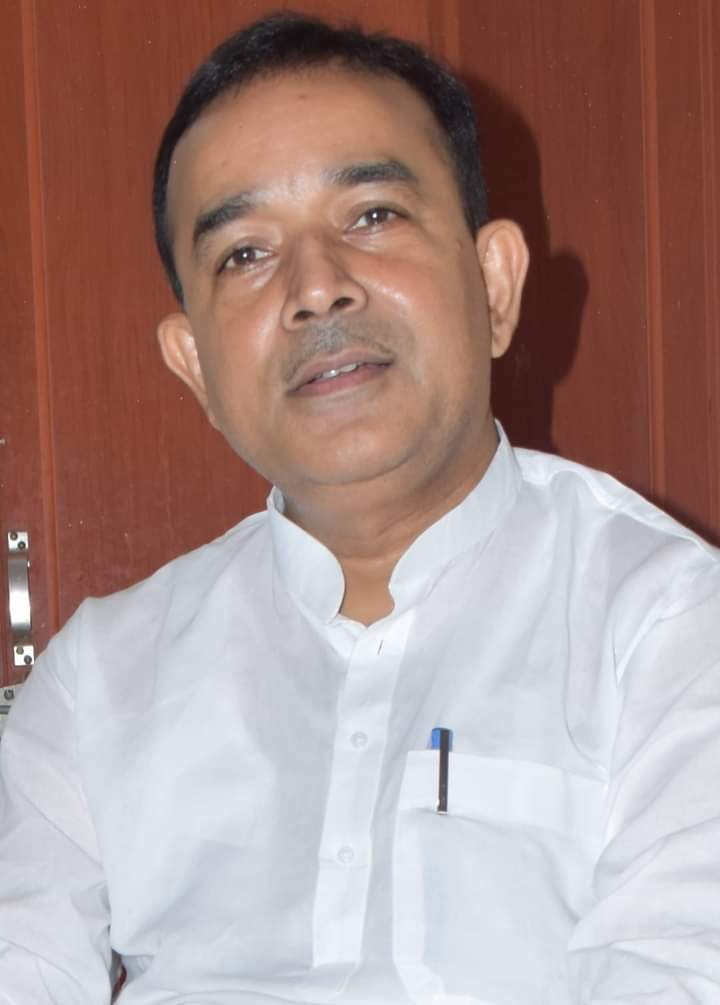
- Kumar in 2022

Member of Bihar Legislative Assembly
- Incumbent
- Assumed office February 2005
- Preceded by: Satish Kumar
- Constituency: Asthawan

Personal details
- Born: 25 May 1972 (age 54) Asthawan, Nalanda, Bihar, India
- Party: Janata Dal (United)
- Children: 1 Son and 1 daughter
- Parent: Ayodhya Prasad (Father)
- Education: P.hd and M.A. (Magadh University)
- Occupation: Business and Politician

Jitendra Kumar (born 1972) is an Indian politician from Bihar who was elected as an MLA five times, from Asthawan Assembly constituency, in Nalanda District. He won the 2020 Bihar Legislative Assembly election representing Janata Dal (United).

== Early life and education ==
Kumar is from Asthawan, Nalanda district, Bihar. His father Ayodhya Prasad was also represented Asthawan two times in 1972 and 1980.He completed his doctorate in 2003 at Magadh University. Earlier, he did his M.A. at the same university in 1994.

== Political career ==
Kumar won from Asthawan Assembly constituency representing Janata Dal (United) in the 2020 Bihar Legislative Assembly election. He polled 51,525 votes and defeated his nearest rival, Anil Kumar of Rashtriya Janata Dal, by a margin of 11,600 votes.

He first became an MLA winning the February 2005 Bihar Legislative Assembly election from Asthawan Assembly constituency representing Janata Dal (United) and also clinched the October 2005 Bihar Legislative Assembly election defeating 2005 Bihar Legislative Assembly election independent candidate Puspanjay, by a margin of 15,486 votes. He retained the seat for JD(U) winning the 2010 Bihar Legislative Assembly election.At that time, he had defeated the powerful leader of his time and former M.L.C. Kapildev Singh of L.J.P., by a margin of 19,570 votes. He won for the third time in the 2015 Bihar Legislative Assembly election defeating Chhote Lal Yadav of Lok Janshakti Party by a margin of 10,444 votes.
