= Chandra Mohan Kumar =

Ophthalmic anaesthetist

Professor Chandra Mohan Kumar
- Born: Chandra; 24 June 1948 (age 78); Cheran Village, Bihar, India
- Occupation: Anaesthetist
- Known for: Britain’s Top Doctor under the anesthesia category

Chandra Mohan Kumar (born 24 June 1948) is an Indian ophthalmic anaesthetist. He worked as a consultant anaesthetist at James Cook University Hospital in Middlesbrough and later as a senior consultant at Khoo Teck Puat Hospital in Singapore.

He has done work on fasting guidelines, ophthalmic anaesthesia, elderly anaesthesia, local anaesthesia, endocrine anaesthesia, oral anesthesia and airway management.

In 2010, he was named Britain's Top Doctor under the anesthesia category by The Times newspaper.

== Early life and education ==
He was born on 24 June 1948 in Cheran Village, Bihar, India. He attended high school in Harnaut, Bihar. Later, he enrolled in Bihar National College, Patna University, in order to complete intermediate studies.

A graduate of Prince of Wales Medical College, Patna, which is now known as Patna Medical College Hospital (PMCH), he received his MBBS degree in 1973. From 1976 to 1979, he worked at the Bihar Military Hospital, Patna as a Civil Assistant Surgeon.

After arrival in England in 1979, he was enrolled in the Faculty of Anesthesia at the Royal College of Surgeons in England, London and received DARCS (Diploma in Anaesthesia). Further, he received higher degrees, FFARCS from the Faculty of Anaesthesia, Royal College of Surgeons in Ireland in 1984, MSc. (Medical Informatics) from the University of Teesside, Middlesbrough, UK in 1997, FRCA (Fellow of the Royal College of Anaesthetists in 2001, London), EDRA (European Diploma in Regional Anaesthesia in 2010 by the European Society of Regional Anaesthesia, Brussels). He was conferred honorary FAMS (Fellow of Academy of Medicine Singapore) in 2022.

== Career ==
Upon completion of his MBBS, he served as a house officer and senior house officer in various medical sub-specialties at PMCH between 1973 and 1976. In 1976, he worked as a Civil Assistant Surgeon at the Bihar Military Police Hospital in Patna.

Upon moving to the United Kingdom in 1979, he joined the National Health Service (NHS). He worked in the position of Registrar in Anaesthesia in Sunderland and Middlesbrough between 1982 and 1984. Later, he held the position of Senior Registrar in Anaesthesia at Newcastle and Middlesbrough from 1984 to 1987. The Royal College of Surgeons in Ireland awarded him the designation of Fellow of the Faculty of Anaesthetists, Royal College of Surgeons (FFARCS) in 1984.

He later became a Consultant Anaesthetist at James Cook University Hospital, Middlesbrough. In 2001, he received FRCA (Fellow, Royal College of Anaesthetists, London). Additionally, he was offered Honorary Professor for running MSc in Evidence Based Anaesthesia Practice at School of Health, University of Teesside, Middlesbrough, UK (2004–2014). He retired from NHS in March 2011 and moved to Singapore and appointed as Senior Consultant Anaesthetist in Khoo Teck Puat Hospital. He is also a visiting professor at Newcastle University Medical School in Malaysia.

== Awards ==
- Top Britain Doctors in the anaesthesia category in 2010.
- Platinum 2010 Award presented by the Advisory Committee of Clinical Excellence Award, Department of Health to a practicing UK consultant in the National Health Service.
- Lifetime achievement award by the British Ophthalmic Anaesthesia Society in 2010.

== Books & publications ==
Chandra has published more than 200 research papers and edited/authored more than 8 books. He has h-index of 27, I index of 61. His research garnered more than 2520 citations and Research Interest Score of 1061.

Here is list of his published books:

Jaichandran, V V; Kumar, Chandra M; Jagadeesh, V (2018). Principles and Practice of Ophthalmic Anaesthesia. India: Jaypee Digital. p. 375. ISBN 9789386261236.

Principles and Practice of Ophthalmic Anaesthesia, ISBN 9789386261236. Editor: Jaichandra VV, Kumar Chandra M, Jagadeesh V Publisher: Jaypee Brothers Medical Publishers (P) Ltd Jaypee https://www.jaypeedigital.com/book/9789386261236 DOI: 10.5005/jp/books/14237

Oxford Anaesthesia Library Anaesthesia for the Elderly Patient, ISBN 9789386261236. Editor: Chris Dodds, Chandra Kumar, Frederique Servin Publisher: Oxford University Press, 2nd Edition https://doi.org/10.1093/med/9780199234622.002.0004

Oxford Textbook of Anaesthesia for the elderly, ISBN 9780199604999. Editor: Dodds C, Kumar Chandra M, Veering B. Publisher: Oxford University Press, https://doi.org/10.1093/med/9780199604999.001.0001

Oxford Handbook of Ophthalmic Anaesthesia, ISBN 9780199604999. Editor: Chandra Kumar, Chris Dodds, Steven Gayer Publisher: Oxford University Press https://doi.org/10.1093/med/9780199591398.001.0001

Oxford Textbook in Anaesthesia, Anaesthesia for Maxillofacial Surgery, ISBN 9780199564217. Editor: Ian Shaw, Chandra Kumar, Chris Dodds Publisher: Oxford University Press https://doi.org/10.1093/med/9780199564217.001.0001

Oxford Anaesthesia Library Anaesthesia for the Elderly Patient, ISBN 978-0-19-923524-7, 2008 Editor: Chris Dodds, Chandra Kumar, Frederique Servin Publisher: Oxford University Press, 1st Edition https://doi.org/10.1093/med/9780199234622.002.0004

Gastrointestinal and Colorectal Anesthesia, ISBN 0-8493-4073-X. Editor: C. M. Kumar M. Bellamy Publisher: Informa Healthcare, New York, USA https://doi.org/10.1093/bja/aem349

Practical Guide to Clinical Procedures and Common Emergencies, ISBN 9026519710, 9789026519710. Editor: Chandra M Kumar, Chriss Dodds Publisher: Taylor and Francis

Clinical Teaching: A guide to teaching practical Anaesthesia, Editor: David Greaves, Chris Dodds, Chandra M. Kumar, Berend Mets Publisher: Swets & Zeitlinger, The Netherlands https://www.routledge.com/Clinical-Teaching-A-Guide-to-Teaching-Practical-Anaesthesia/Dodds-Greaves-Kumar-Mets/p/book/9789026519413

Ophthalmic Anaesthesia, ISBN 9789026519413. Editor: Kumar Chandra, Dodds Chris, Fanning Gary Publisher: Swets & Zeitlinger https://www.researchgate.net/publication/311648814_Ophthalmic_Anaesthesia
