= Kaushalendra Kumar =

Indian politician

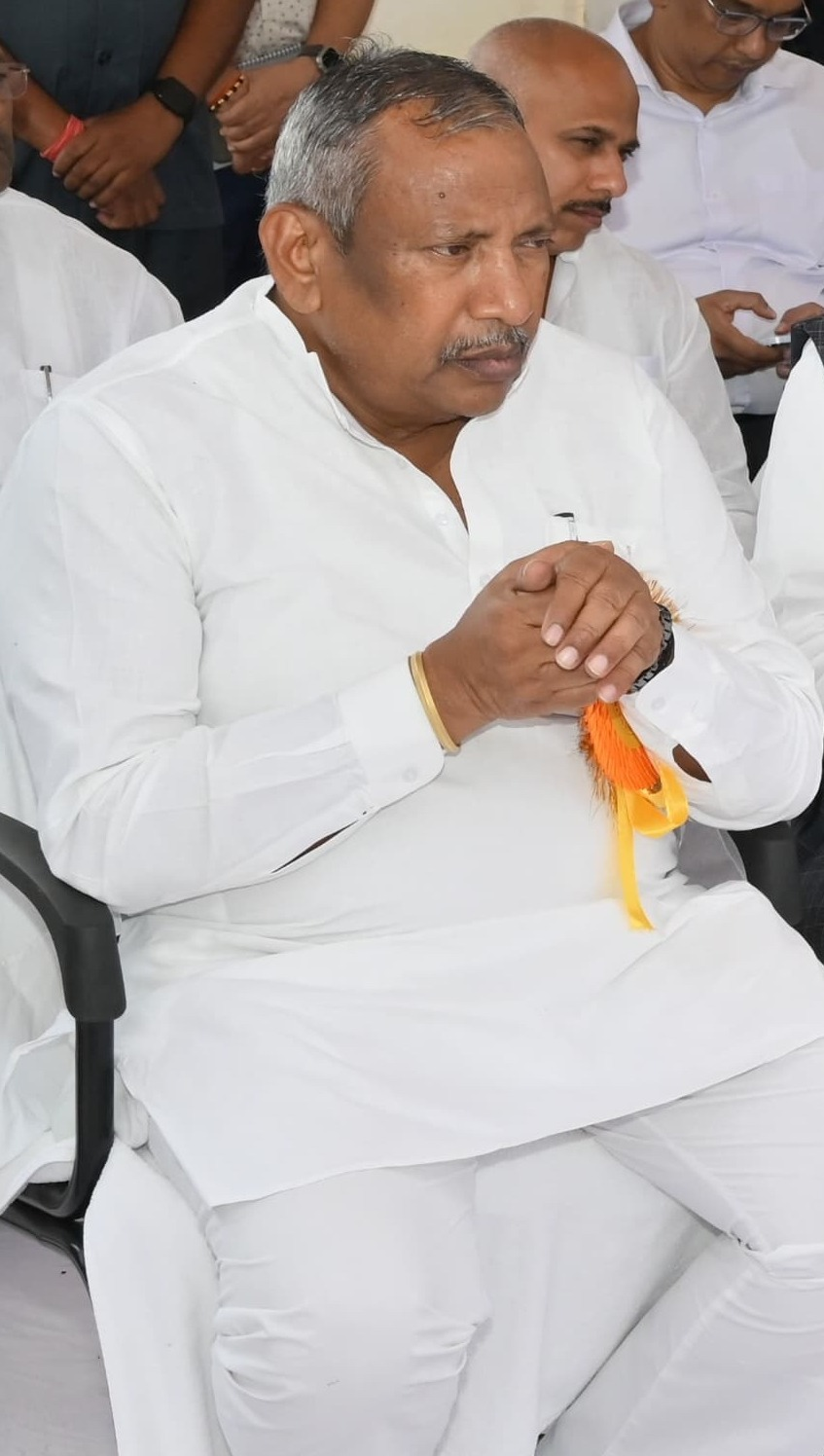

Member of Parliament, Lok Sabha
- Incumbent
- Assumed office 16 May 2009
- Preceded by: Ram Swarup Prasad
- Constituency: Nalanda

Personal details
- Born: 13 January 1959 (age 67) Village Haidarchak, Nalanda district, Bihar
- Party: Janata Dal (United)
- Spouse: Raveena kumari
- Children: 2 sons and 1 daughter

Kaushalendra Kumar (born 13 January 1959) is a Member of Parliament for the Nalanda constituency of the India Lok Sabha. He is a representative of the Janata Dal (United) party. He was first elected to the Lok Sabha in the 2009 Indian general election, when he succeeded and was nominated by Nitish Kumar in the constituency. He again won the Nalanda seat in the 2014 Indian general election. He won by a narrow margin of 9,627 votes. In the 2019 general election, he got a record 540,888 votes and defeated his nearest rival by 256,137 votes.

== Personal life ==
He is a supporter of agrarian and social reform. His father was a farmer. Kaushalendra Kumar is married to Raveena Kumari in 1979. The couple has two sons. His wife is a District Council member from Nalanda.

== See also ==
- Nitish Kumar
- Nalanda District
- Janata Dal (United)
- Kapildeo Singh
- RCP Singh

== Education ==
He took his education from S.P.M. College Nalanda, Magadh University. He has a Bachelor of Arts. He also has an Agriculture Education from Kisan College, Sohsarai, Nalanda.

Party political offices
Preceded by Ram Sundar Das	Leader of the Janata Dal (United) Party in the 16th Lok Sabha; 2014–present	Incumbent
