= Islampur, Nalanda =

City in Bihar, India (District-Nalanda)

Islampur
- Town
- Location in Bihar, India
- Coordinates: 25.15°N 85.2°E
- Country: India
- State: Bihar
- District: Nalanda

Government
  - Type: Nagar parishad
  - Body: Nagar Parishad Islampur
  - Chairman: Kiran Devi
  - Member of Legislative Assembly: Ruhail Ranjan
- Elevation: 63 m (207 ft)

Population (2011)
  - Total: 53,243

Languages
  - Spoken: Magahi, Hindi
- Time zone: UTC+5:30 (IST)
- PIN: 801303
- Telephone code: 06111
- ISO 3166 code: IN-BR
- Vehicle registration: BR-21
- Literacy: 75.38
- Lok Sabha constituency: Nalanda (29)
- Vidhan Sabha constituency: Islampur (174)
- Website: islampurmunicipal.com

Islampur is a town and Notified area in Nalanda district in the Indian state of Bihar. It is a city council and no of ward is 26 here.

== Geography ==
Islampur is located at 25.15°N 85.2°E. It is situated 65 km (40 mi) from Patna, the capital of Bihar state. It has an average elevation of 63 m (207 ft).

Islampur is not categorized as a city; politically and demographically it lies between a town and a village, and is therefore called a notified area. It has a municipal council, called Nagar Palika Now Upgradeded to Nagar Parisad (including Bardih, Kobil, Kasimpur, Bardih Math and Khedan Bigha village) in India, and is also known as Islampur Nagar Parisad. There are many villages like Bouri Dih, Sherthua, Patanbiha, and Pirbigha are connected with this town.

== Transport ==
Islampur is well connected to Patna, the state capital, by roads and railway lines. Islampur railway station had a narrow gauge railway line since 1922, which was recently converted to a broad gauge line. Islampur is connected directly to New Delhi by the Magadh Express. A new train, the Hatia-Islampur Express, is also running. Currently two express trains and three passenger trains Patna-Islampur and Fatuha-Islampur Passenger(Formerly Buxar-islampur fast passenger) run on this track. It is also well connected from Gaya, Rajgir and Biharsharif Nalanda by road. Bus fare are normally 50 rupees per head from Biharsharif and to Rajgir 60 rupee which is not too much fare, so people need a public transport for budget fare.

== Demographics ==
As of 2011 India census, Islampur is a Nagar Parishad city in district of Nalanda, Bihar. The Islampur city is divided into 19 wards for which elections are held every 5 years. The Islampur Nagar Parishad has population of 43,211 of which 18,356 are males while 17,285 are females as per report released by Census India 2011.

Population of Children with age of 0–6 is 6201 which is 17.40% of total population of Islampur (NP). In Islampur Nagar Parishad, the female sex ratio is 942 against state average of 918. Moreover, the child sex ratio in Islampur is around 947 compared to Bihar state average of 935. literacy rate of Islampur city is 75.36% higher than the state average of 61.80%. In Islampur, male literacy is around 81.83% while the female literacy rate is 68.48%.

Islampur Nagar Parishad has total administration over 6,088 houses to which it supplies basic amenities like water and sewerage. It is also authorized to build roads within Nagar Parishad limits and impose taxes on properties coming under its jurisdiction. With economic growth, new businesses are setting up in the area. Vehicle dealerships have opened and a four-lane highway is under construction to Rajgir. Durga Puja, Deepavali, Holi, Chhath Puja and Ram Navami are the most popular Hindu ritual festivals. Moharram is the most popular Muslim festival.
