= Silao, Nalanda =

Silao Nalanda Silao
- city of sweets
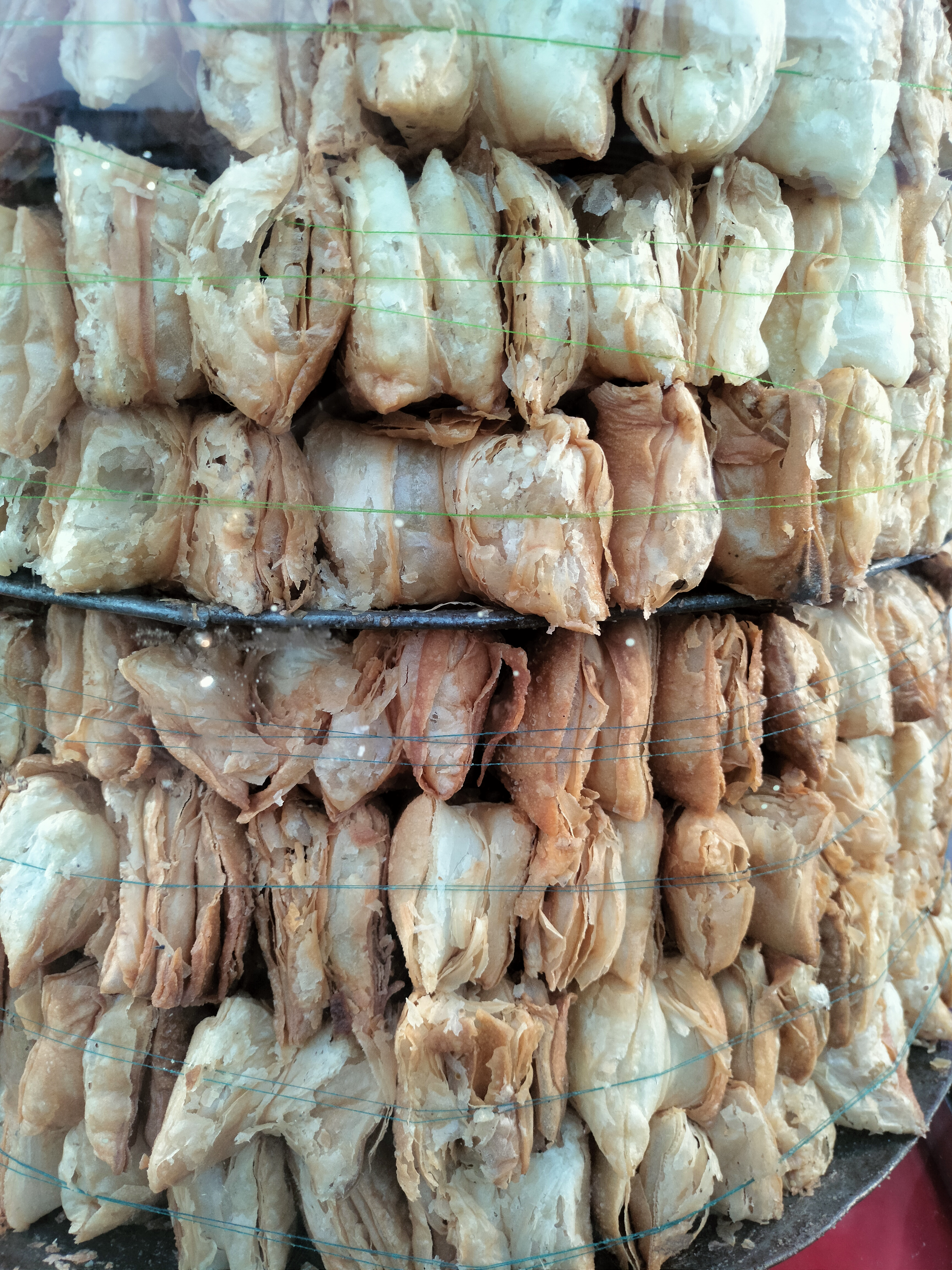

- Location in Bihar, India
- Coordinates: 25.081°N 85.428°E
- Country: India
- State: Bihar
- District: Nalanda
- Elevation: 60 m (200 ft)

Population (2011)
  - Total: 25,618

Languages
  - Official: Magadhi, Hindi
- Time zone: UTC+5:30 (IST)
- ISO 3166 code: IN-BR

Silao is a city and a notified area in Nalanda district in the Indian state of Bihar. It is known for the excellent Khaja made by its Halwais. It is also the headquarters of a Block, a small administrative unit, by the same name.

== Geography ==
Silao is located at 25.081°N 85.428°E. It has an average elevation of 60 metres (196 feet).

== Demographics ==
As of 2001 India census, Silao had a population of 20,177. Males constitute 52% of the population and females 48%. Silao has an average literacy rate of 52%, lower than the national average of 59.5%: male literacy is 60%, and female literacy is 43%. In Silao, 19% of the population is under 6 years of ag

== Economy ==
Banks

- Allahabad Bank
- Madhya Bihar Gramin Bank
- State Bank of India
- Punjab National Bank
- Sub Post Office
- Kisan market, silao
- Union Bank of India
