= Nalanda district =

District in Bihar, India

Coordinates: 25°12′00″N 85°31′12″E

- District
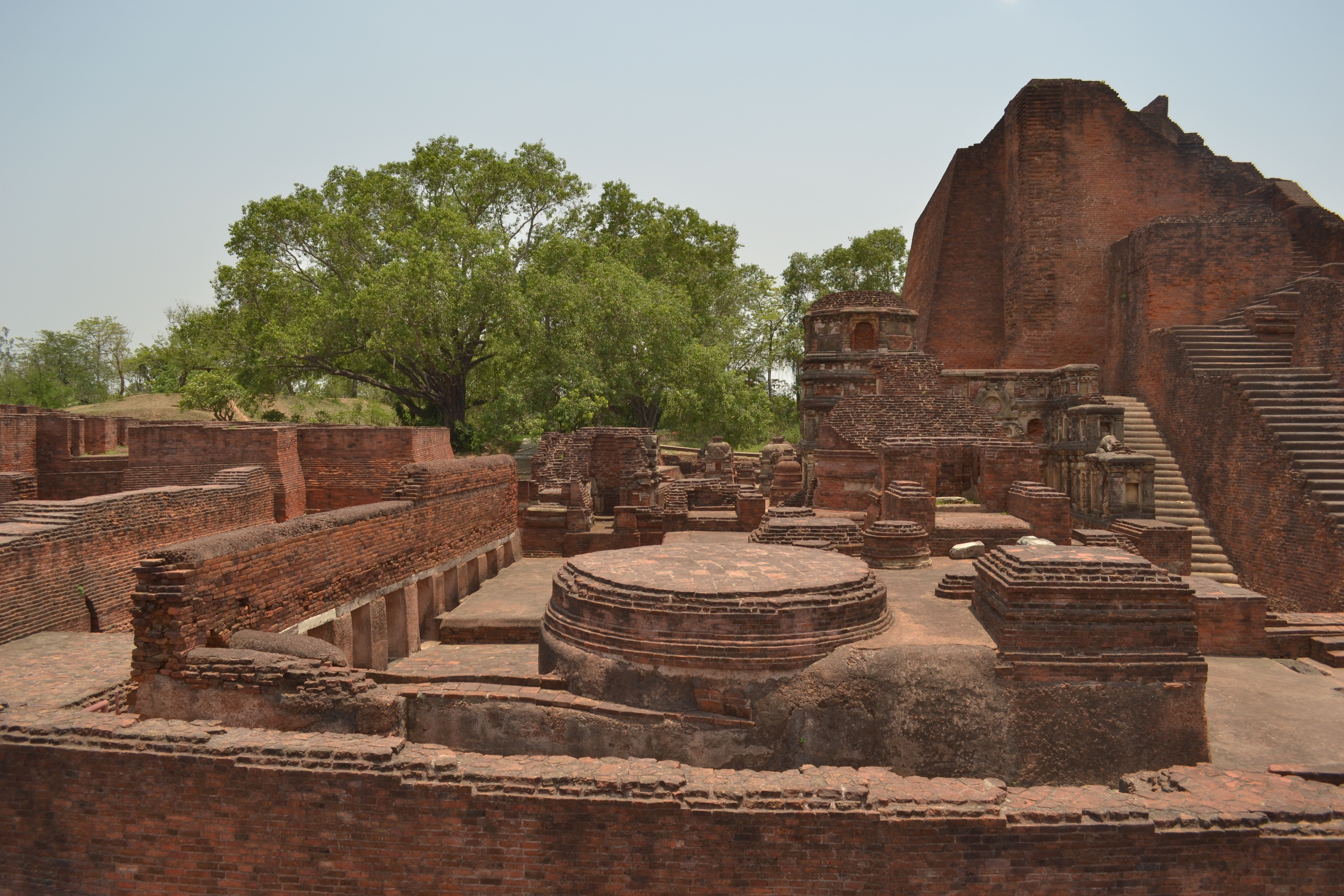
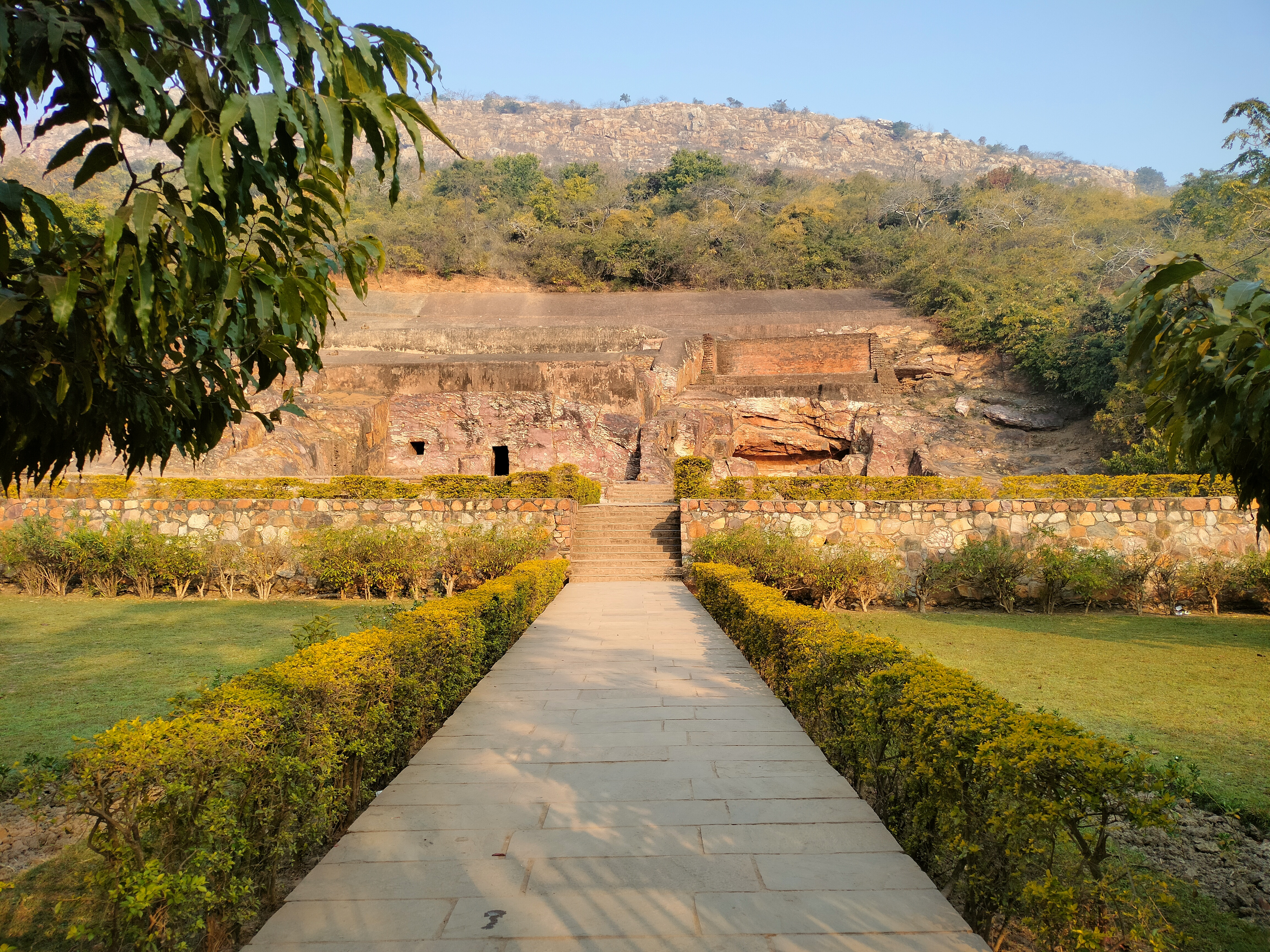
- Top: Ruins of Nalanda mahavihara Bottom: Son Bhandar Caves, Rajgir

- Location of Nalanda district in Bihar
- Country: India
- State: Bihar
- Division: Patna
- Established: 9 November 1972
- Headquarters: Bihar Sharif

Government
  - Lok Sabha constituencies: Nalanda

Area
  - Total: 2,367 km^{2} (914 sq mi)
  - Urban: 112.91 km^{2} (43.59 sq mi)

Population (2011)
  - Total: 2,877,653
  - Density: 1,216/km^{2} (3,149/sq mi)

Demographics
  - Literacy: 66.41 (M=77.11; F=54.76)
  - Sex ratio: 921 (2011)
- Time zone: UTC+05:30 (IST)
- PIN Code: 803111
- Major highways: NH 20, NH 33, NH 120, NH 431
- Website: Nalanda District

Nalanda district is one of the thirty-eight districts of the state of Bihar in India. Bihar Sharif is the administrative headquarters of this district. The districts is home to the ancient Nalanda Mahavihara a UNESCO World Heritage Site. Nalanda is located in the Magadh region of southern Bihar.

== In Jainism ==
- The 24th Jaina Tirthankara Mahāvīra is said to have spent 'many Cāturmāsyas (rainy seasons)' at Nālandā. Canonical scriptures of the Śvetāmbara sect also mention that Nālandā was known by other names such as Nālandāpada and Nālandā Sanniveśa. The texts further highlight that it was a suburb of Rājagṛha. Mahāvīra is said to have had met Makkhali-gosāla, the leader of the Ājīvakas, for the first time at Nālandā.
- Jaina tradition records that some of Mahāvīra's Gaṇadharas (disciples), namely Indrabhūti Gautama, Agnibhūti Gautama, and Vāyubhūti Gautama were born in Nālandā.
- Sūtrakṛtāṅga Sūtra, a canonical Jaina scripture, contains a lecture (Book 2, Lecture 7) narrating a conversation about non-violence between Indrabhūti Gautama and Lepa, a Jaina householder in Nālandā.
- Majjhima Nikāya, an ancient Buddhist text, mentions that Mahāvīra had visited Nālandā along with many of his followers.
- Vividha Tīrtha Kalpa, a 14th-century text by Ācārya Jinaprabhasūri, mentions that Mahāvīra completed 14 rainy seasons at Nālandā and that 'it is the source of all beauty'.
- In his travel chronicle written in 1509 CE, Jaina monk, Muni Hansasomavijaya mentions the presence of 16 Jaina temples in Nālandā. Panyās Jayavijaya states the presence of 17 Jaina temples by 1608 CE in the region. However, by 1694 CE, most of the temples were destroyed and Panyās Saubhāgyavijaya records the presence of a temple and a stūpa only.
- The ASIGoI report of 1861 mentions the presence of a Jaina temple in the premises of the ruins of Nālandā University. It was found to have had the same architecture style as seen in the Great Temple at Bodha Gayā and was dated to the 5th century CE. The temple was found to have Jaina images and sculptures dated to 1447 CE.
- The Indian Antiquary (1918) mentions that the Jaina temple found within the ruins of Nālandā is the oldest temple in the region.
- According to Muni Nyāyavijaya (c. 1949), there were 2 Jaina temples and at least 100 Jaina images at Nālandā.
- The Indian Archaeology (1955-56) also mentions the recovery of a Jaina image from Nālandā.
- Currently, the Śvetāmbara Jaina temple at Nālandā shares a wall with the ruins of Nālandā University and has ancient Jaina images dated to as early as the 10th century CE. The principal idol of the temple is an image of Ṛṣabhanātha, the 1st Jaina Tirthankara. It features unique iconography depicting Marudevī, his mother, on top of his head. The image also features elongated hairlocks, typically seen in Śvetāmbara Jaina iconography of Ṛṣabhanātha. Other ancient images include idols of Śāntinātha, the 16th Jaina Tirthankara, Mahāvīra, the 24th Jaina Tirthankara and of Pārśvanātha, the 23rd Jaina Tirthankara. Ancient footprints of Indrabhūti Gautama and other Gaṇadharas are also present in a separate temple in the same premises.

== History ==
Nalanda became a fully-fledged district when it was split from Patna on 9 November 1972.

== Geography ==
Nalanda district occupies an area of 2,355 square kilometres (909 sq mi). The Phalgu, Mohane, Jirayan, and Kumbhari rivers flow through it. The district is a part of Patna Division. Majority of the land in the district is fertile land of Indo Gangetic plane. In the extreme South, there lies the hills of Rajgir. There is also one small hillock in the district headquarters of Bihar Sharif.

=== Flora and fauna ===
In 1978 Nalanda district became home to the Pant Wildlife Sanctuary, Rajgir which has an area of 35.84 km^{2} (13.8 mi^{2}).

== Demographics ==
Historical population
Year	Pop.	±% p.a.
1901	595,009	—
1911	589,310	−0.10%
1921	577,663	−0.20%
1931	676,424	+1.59%
1941	785,619	+1.51%
1951	926,189	+1.66%
1961	1,086,972	+1.61%
1971	1,304,832	+1.84%
1981	1,639,922	+2.31%
1991	1,996,257	+1.99%
2001	2,370,528	+1.73%
2011	2,877,653	+1.96%

Religions in Nalanda District (2011)
Religion	Percent
Hinduism	92.78%
Islam	6.88%
Others	0.34%

According to the 2011 census Nalanda district has a population of 2,877,653, roughly equal to the nation of Mongolia or the US state of Kansas. This gives it a ranking of 134th in India (out of a total of 640), and 18th in state. The district has a population density of 1,220 inhabitants per square kilometre (3,200/sq mi). Its population growth rate over the decade 2001-2011 was 21.18%. Nalanda has a sex ratio of 921 females for every 1000 males, and a literacy rate of 66.41%. 15.91% of the population lives in urban areas. Scheduled Castes and Scheduled Tribes make up 21.12% and 0.05% of the population respectively.

Languages of Nalanda district (2011)
1. Magahi (56.3%)
2. Hindi (37.3%)
3. Urdu (5.69%)
4. Others (0.76%)

At the time of the 2011 Census of India, 56.27% of the population in the district spoke Magahi, 37.28% Hindi and 5.69% Urdu as their first language.

== Politics ==
Since Kurmis are dominant in Nalanda, it is also known by the name Kurmistan in political circle. Nalanda district is the birthplace of Chief Minister of Bihar, Nitish Kumar. The Nalanda district comprises Nalanda Lok Sabha constituency, which can further be fragmented into seven Legislative Assembly constituencies. In 2015 Bihar Assembly elections, Janata Dal (United) (JDU), the political party led by Kumar was able to win five out of seven Legislative Assembly constituencies of the district. It has been stated that preponderance of Kushwahas apart from Kurmis and sizeable population of Extremely Backward Castes, who are considered as the supporters of Kumar, has been the prime factor behind success of JDU in polls conducted in this district.

District	No.	Constituency	Name	Party	Alliance	Remarks
Nalanda	171	Asthawan	Jitendra Kumar	JD(U)	NDA	
Nalanda	172	Biharsharif	Sunil Kumar	BJP	NDA	
Nalanda	173	Rajgir (SC)	Kaushal Kishore	JD(U)	NDA	
Nalanda	174	Islampur	Ruhail Ranjan	JD(U)	NDA	
Nalanda	175	Hilsa	Krishna Murari Sharan	JD(U)	NDA	
Nalanda	176	Nalanda	Shrawan Kumar	JD(U)	NDA	Minister
Nalanda	177	Harnaut	Hari Narayan Singh	JD(U)	NDA	

== Administration ==
Nalanda district was established as a separate district on 9 November 1972, with its headquarters at Bihar Sharif. Prior to its formation, it functioned as the Bihar Sharif subdivision of Patna district.

=== Sub-divisions ===
The district is divided into three revenue sub-divisions for administrative convenience. Each sub-division is headed by a Sub-Divisional Magistrate (SDM), who also functions as the Revenue Divisional Officer. The SDM is assisted by officers in the cadre of Tahsildar. Sub-divisional offices function as intermediary administrative units between the district headquarters and the blocks.

The three sub-divisions are:

1. Bihar Sharif (Sadar Sub-division) – The most urbanised part of the district.
2. Hilsa – Predominantly rural and agricultural.
3. Rajgir – The smallest sub-division and important from a tourism perspective. Major heritage and pilgrimage sites such as Rajgir, Nalanda Mahavihara and Pawapuri are located in this sub-division.

==== Revenue statistics ====
Revenue Sub-division	Anchals	Halkas	Revenue Villages
Bihar Sharif	7	51	429
Hilsa	8	22	198
Rajgir	5	46	457
Total	20	119	1084

=== Blocks ===
The district consists of 20 Community Development Blocks, each headed by a Block Development Officer (BDO).The 20 Blocks under 3 Tehsils in Nalanda district are as follows:

Tehsil (Sub-division)	CD Blocks
Bihar Sharif	Bihar Sharif, Rahui, Noorsarai, Asthawan, Bind ,sermera and rahui
Rajgir	Rajgir, Silao, Giriyak, BEN , and katrisarai
Hilsa	Hilsa, Ekangarsarai, Chandi, Nagarnausa, Karai Parsurai, Parwalpur,tharthari and islampur

=== Local bodies ===
Classification	Number
Municipal Corporation	1
Municipal Councils	3
Nagar Panchayats	12
Blocks	20
Village Panchayats	231

The only Municipal Corporation in the district is Bihar Sharif.

=== Police administration ===
The district police administration is headed by the Superintendent of Police (SP), Nalanda. The district is divided into police sub-divisions corresponding to the administrative sub-divisions:

- SDPO, Sadar (Bihar Sharif)
- SDPO, Rajgir
- SDPO, Hilsa
- DSP (Headquarters)

== Status ==
Nalanda district is fast developing and the ruins of the ancient Nalanda University or UNESCO Nalanda Archaeological Site attracts tourists from all over the world driving the local economy.

== Economy ==
Agriculture is the backbone of the economy, with the majority of the population engaged in agriculture. Rice, wheat, maize, pulses, potato, fruits, and vegetables are the main crops, upon the recommendation of Chief Minister Nitish Kumar Bihar Sharif was selected among 100 indian cities, and four from Bihar, to be developed under Smart Cities Mission of the indian government., Bihar Sharif is one the largest cities in South Bihar, it is a major hub for Agricultural trade, Health and Commerce.

A Railways coach maintaince plant is located in Harnaut. In 1999, Defence Minister George Fernandes laid the foundations for an Ordanance Factory at Rajgir.

Tourism is well developed, Rajgir holds immense historical significance as it was the earliest capital of Magadha, million of people visit the ruins of ancient Nalanda University, Rajgir and Pawapuri. Buddha had spent years at this place. Surrounded by five hills, it has got scenic views. Pawapuri, the Nirwana place of Mahavir, is holy place for the Jains, In 2022, Rajgir Zoo Safari was opened. In 2006 the Ministry of Panchayati Raj named Nalanda one of the country's 250 most backward districts (out of a total of 640). It is one of the 36 districts in Bihar currently receiving funds from the Backward Regions Grant Fund Programme (BRGF).

== Notable people ==
- Kalim Ajiz, a Padma Shri recipient and Urdu writer
- Shah Amanat, a Sufi figure
- Satyadev Narayan Arya, politician and Governor of Haryana
- Aasim Bihari, social activist
- Abdul Qavi Desnavi, Urdu language writer, critic, bibliographer, and linguist.
- Nawal Kishore Dhawal, a writer, poet, editor, and critic
- Ganesh Dutt, administrator and educationalist
- Manazir Ahsan Gilani, a writer and Islamic scholar
- Jabir Husain, politician
- Zafar Iqbal, former Indian field hockey player and captain
- Abhay Kumar, a poet-diplomat
- Chandra Mohan Kumar, named as the Britain's "Top Doctor" under the anaesthesia category by The Times newspaper in 2010
- Kaushalendra Kumar, MP of Nalanda
- Nitish Kumar, Chief Minister of Bihar and former MP from Nalanda
- Vikas Kumar, actor
- Sulaiman Nadvi, Islamic scholar, writer and Pakistani historian
- Krishna Ballabh Prasad Narain, RSS activist
- Mrityunjay Prabhakar, theatre director and dramatist
- Kapil Dev Prasad, a weaver and Padma Shri recipient
- L. S. N. Prasad, Indian paediatrician and Padma Shri recipient
- Siddheshwar Prasad, former MP and served as Governor of Tripura
- Pramod Ranjan, journalist
- Abul Muhasin Muhammad Sajjad, Islamic scholar, political activist and politician
- Brahmadeo Narayan Singh, singer
- Kapildev Prasad Singh, former member of Bihar Legislative Council from Nalanda
- Rajesh Kumar Singh M.L.C from Nalanda
- Ramchandra Prasad Singh, Member of Rajya Sabha and former IAS officer
- Veer Pratap Singh, Cricketer
- Tarkeshwari Sinha, politician
- Hari Uppal, founder of Bhartiya Nritya Kala Mandir and a Padma Shri recipient
- Vijay Kumar Yadav, Ex- MP from Nalanda
