= List of villages in Sheikhpura district =

Sheikhpura district of Bihar, India comprises only one sub-division, Sheikhpura, which is divided into 6 Blocks and has a total of 310 villages. There are 52 uninhabited villages (out of 310 total villages) in the district of Sheikhpura.

This is list of villages of Sheikhpura district according to respective blocks.

== Ariari ==
There are 68 villages in Ariari block as per 2011 census of India. The following is a list of villages in Ariari block.

List of Villages
Village Code	Village	Gram Panchayat	Area (Hectare)	Population (2011)	Households (2011)
244098	Aifni	Aifni	785	4,631	730
244056	Amarpur	Aifni	85.1	295	48
244120	Anjanpokhar	Aifni	0	40	4
244097	Bahadurpur	Aifni	40	528	70
244112	Datuara	Aifni	66.2	407	75
244053	Dhankaul	Aifni	209.3	1,670	225
244101	Latkana	Aifni	234	1,228	182
244055	Mai	Aifni	55.2	809	107
244099	Manipur Aima	Aifni	123.1	1,061	173
244100	Manipur Shashikan	Aifni	56	0	0
244054	Teldih	Aifni	127	614	102
244082	Ariari	Biman	177.8	1,755	243
244073	Aruara	Biman	75	935	124
244084	Biman	Biman	649.2	4,806	711
244070	Gagaura	Biman	57	685	135
244080	Kamalpur	Biman	166.6	1,058	135
244085	Rampur	Biman	119	1,546	241
244079	Reuta	Biman	125.1	675	101
244083	Sanwar	Biman	89.3	0	0
244074	Badokhar	Chodhdargah	79.8	0	0
244077	Bhalua	Chodhdargah	96.6	311	56
244119	Chodhdargah	Chodhdargah	633	6,762	999
244081	Gohda	Chodhdargah	200	2,003	275
244078	Mahuli	Chodhdargah	136	1,102	152
244076	Narayanpur	Chodhdargah	22.4	0	0
244075	Sohdi	Chodhdargah	172	1,753	235
244104	Barsa	Chorvar	468.2	2,250	331
244108	Baruni	Chorvar	85	1,432	208
244107	Chorvar	Chorvar	529	3,755	574
244106	Jakhaur	Chorvar	115.2	245	45
244103	Mahuet	Chorvar	196	2,153	315
244105	Sumka	Chorvar	149	1,245	179
244072	Baikathpur	Diha	99.8	1,337	174
244087	Diha	Diha	754.2	6,448	1,059
244068	Ekrain	Diha	153	1,437	189
244069	Itahara	Diha	85	1,852	283
244086	Raundaphar	Diha	76.8	99	15
244071	Sahasrama	Diha	66	264	45
244096	Hazratpur Madro	Hazratpur Madro	367	3,497	472
244090	Karki	Hazratpur Madro	360	2,293	361
244092	Pathraita	Hazratpur Madro	58.2	350	52
244094	Ranka	Hazratpur Madro	104.4	1,083	142
244093	Raundi	Hazratpur Madro	233.2	987	173
244091	Usari	Hazratpur Madro	68	607	95
244095	Vrindavan	Hazratpur Madro	289.8	2,501	390
244067	Husainabad	Husainabad	418	6,313	1,034
244088	Navinagar Kakrar	Husainabad	463	3,183	447
244110	Ishapur	Kasar	84.4	639	109
244113	Kasar	Kasar	928	6,847	970
244111	Nepura	Kasar	38	0	0
244102	Sasbahna	Kasar	559.8	4,025	676
244089	Belchhi	Sanaiya	572.8	3,195	513
244060	Bhojdih	Sanaiya	135.9	1,377	257
244061	Deopuri	Sanaiya	70.7	765	129
244062	Dhanaul	Sanaiya	87.8	482	91
244058	Fatehpur	Sanaiya	33.7	0	0
244064	Jakhaur	Sanaiya	139.2	798	132
244065	Mankaul	Sanaiya	121.7	1,051	178
244066	Pandhar	Sanaiya	140.9	592	99
244063	Rasalpur	Sanaiya	34.4	0	0
244059	Sahnaura	Sanaiya	122.5	577	85
244057	Sanaiya	Sanaiya	521.3	4,176	683
244118	Afardih	Varuna	157	1,310	195
244114	Chak Abgil	Varuna	144	1,003	163
244117	Daudpur Itawa	Varuna	99	936	110
244115	Gangapur	Varuna	228	1,130	184
244109	Masaudha	Varuna	372	2,701	386
244116	Varuna	Varuna	353	2,461	353
Total			14,662.6	1,12,070	17,019

== Barbigha ==
There are 63 villages in Barbigha block as per 2011 census of India, out of which only 43 villages are inhabited. The following is a list of villages in Barbigha block.

List of Villages
Village Code	Village Name	Gram Panchayat	Area (Hectare)	Population (2011)	Households (2011)
243815	Bhanpura	Jagdishpur	57.1	205	36
243818	Jagdishpur	Jagdishpur	179.4	1,627	306
243816	Kabirpura	Jagdishpur	205.6	1,943	323
243817	Kanhauli	Jagdishpur	120	1,323	224
243825	Musapur	Jagdishpur	97.2	1,659	252
243822	Saraia (Note: Included in Barbigha Municipal Council in 2021)	Jagdishpur	97	871	149
243820	Tetarpur	Jagdishpur	109.1	466	84
243819	Ukhadi	Jagdishpur	189.5	2,334	358
243827	Baijnathpur	Keoti	79	1,093	128
243832	Biskurwa	Keoti	16.2	0	0
243830	Chak Suja	Keoti	10	0	0
243829	Dih Nizamat	Keoti	141	1,937	312
243837	Keoti	Keoti	342.1	3,037	492
243826	Lachhmipur	Keoti	14.4	371	59
243831	Milki Chak	Keoti	47	1,009	108
243844	Ahiapur	Kutaut	34.2	1,478	251
243851	Ahiapur	Kutaut	10.3	0	0
243855	Ahiapur	Kutaut	2.7	0	0
243835	Dharseni	Kutaut	194.3	2,303	359
243833	Goddih	Kutaut	74.4	1,125	175
243858	Jangipur	Kutaut	33.2	625	85
243834	Kasturipur	Kutaut	9.1	0	0
243841	Kutaut	Kutaut	209.1	2,166	335
243848	Ram Raipur Buzurg	Kutaut	3.2	0	0
243842	Ramraipur Buzurg	Kutaut	3.4	0	0
243843	Ramraipur Buzurg	Kutaut	4.6	0	0
243852	Ramraipur Buzurg	Kutaut	16.8	0	0
243856	Ramraipur	Kutaut	10.6	0	0
243836	Sheikhpurwa	Kutaut	57	1,008	153
243857	Shibpur	Kutaut	1.5	0	0
243854	Shibpur	Kutaut	10.5	0	0
243868	Bari Milki	Maldah	25.6	0	0
243869	Chhotki Milki	Maldah	5	0	0
243866	Esmailpur	Maldah	157	1,876	327
243865	Maldah	Maldah	889	7,264	1,129
243864	Milki Chak	Maldah	6.5	1,647	267
243867	Milki	Maldah	7.3	0	0
243824	Chainpur Dih	Pank	40	284	47
243828	Kazi Fatu Chak	Pank	64.1	1,541	266
243823	Pank	Pank	206	2,008	348
243838	Punesra	Pank	124	1,212	184
243821	Toi	Pank	253	3,129	500
243853	Aima Pinjri	Pinjri	28.7	0	0
243862	Bhadarthi	Pinjri	139	1,168	174
243861	Dumri	Pinjri	70	697	90
243859	Kuseri	Pinjri	277	1,443	234
243860	Mahamda	Pinjri	26	668	98
243849	Pinjri	Pinjri	277.4	3,597	543
243845	Gobindpur	Sarba	0.4	0	0
243847	Gobindpur	Sarba	45	0	0
243840	Karman Chak	Sarba	59	194	29
243839	Mirzapur	Sarba	176	1,841	321
243846	Nasratpur	Sarba	5	0	0
243850	Nasratpur	Sarba	6.5	0	0
243810	Rajoura	Sarba	138.1	1,462	224
243863	Sarba	Sarba	414	4,904	795
243808	Daria Chak	Samas Khurd	87.1	1,073	168
243811	Samas Bujurg	Samas Bujurg	189	3,192	505
243807	Samas Khurd	Samas Khurd	664	8,843	1,313
243813	Babhan Bigha	Samas Khurd	211.1	2,810	425
243809	Khalil Chak	Samas Khurd	64	799	117
243812	Khoja Gachhi	Samas Khurd	80	1,545	232
243814	Teus	Teus	747	10,315	1,605
Total			7,861.3	90,092	14,182

== Chewara ==
There are 39 villages in Chewara block as per 2011 census of India. The following is a list of villages in Chewara block.

List of Villages
Village Code	Village	Gram Panchayat	Area (Hectare)	Population (2011)	Households (2011)
244047	Andauli	Chakandra	216	1488	292
244044	Angpur	Ekrama	89	531	75
244016	Asthawan	Lahna	444	2405	349
244050	Bahuwara	Chewara (Note: Included in Chewara Nagar Panchayat in 2021)	401	2412	372
244036	Barari	Chakandra	337	2050	326
244048	Basant	Chakandra	86	717	115
244029	Belchhi	Siyani	437	1830	306
244039	Belkhundi	Ekrama	152	1243	231
244015	Bengucha	Lahna	267	1122	185
244035	Chakandara	Chakandra	430	3027	518
244051	Chewara	Chewara	865	8608	1357
244024	Chhatiara	Chhathiyara	399	3275	465
244022	Dhamsena	Chhathiyara	75.7	644	117
244045	Ekarha	Lohan	605	3275	516
244046	Ekraman	Ekrama	259	2826	421
244043	Fatehpur	Lohan	61	662	102
244038	Gadua	Ekrama	162	1521	276
244018	Ghari	Lahna	278.8	2159	353
244019	Hansapur	Lahna	142.9	846	149
244033	Kamalgarh	Chakandra	81	358	56
244023	Kapasi	Chhathiyara	414	1700	266
244027	Karande	Siyani	597	2440	454
244040	Kemra	Ekrama	90	1275	230
244034	Kewali	Chhathiyara	123	459	66
244028	Kurmuri	Siyani	245	2423	379
244037	Kusekher	Chakandra	117	1367	220
244017	Lahna	Lahna	384	2466	390
244026	Lataut	Chhathiyara	384	2804	469
244042	Lohan	Lohan	1185	5128	775
244021	Maheshpur	Chhathiyara	323	1083	196
244032	Mane	Chakandra	220	600	109
244025	Masarhi	Chhathiyara	134	439	77
244041	Rajaur	Ekrama	306	776	116
244052	Rajpur	Ekrama	66	817	138
244049	Rankar	Chewara	62	566	76
244031	Seani	Siyani	403	2990	522
244020	Sijhori	Chhathiyara	181.4	1764	278
244014	Teai	Lahna	354	1894	293
244030	Uski	Siyani	128	1277	212
Total			11504.8	73267	11847

== Ghatkusumbha ==
There are 24 villages in Ghatkusumbha block as per 2011 census of India. The following is a list of villages in Ghatkusumbha block.

List of Villages
Village Code	Village	Gram Panchayat	Area (Hectare)	Population (2011)	Households (2011)
243995	Alapur	Panapur	440	1630	253
244007	Baoghat	Bhadausi	141	1754	229
244003	Belauni	Gagaur	424.2	1867	267
244009	Bhadaus	Bhadausi	878	4406	684
244005	Bhadausi	Bhadausi	193	2102	285
244010	Dariapur	Bhadausi	161	1168	175
244002	Dumri	Mapho	49.1	0	0
244000	Faridpur	Mapho	51	865	127
244004	Gadbadia	Dihkusumha	460.1	1394	185
243998	Gangaur	Gagaur	541	5477	907
243991	Gurera	Mapho	54	303	64
243996	Haram Chak	Panapur	85	292	44
244012	Jagdispur	Gagaur	74	815	142
243992	Jitwarpur	Panapur	305.1	813	97
244006	Koila	Bhadausi	239	1813	232
244013	Korawan	Gagaur	227	1342	221
243997	Kusmha	Dihkusumha	1949	9949	1453
243994	Mahamadpur	Panapur	100.4	1553	241
243999	Mapho	Mapho	683	4778	787
244001	Oraia	Mapho	260	1235	209
243993	Panapur	Panapur	483	1999	281
244008	Raghunathpur	Bhadausi	251	1	1
244011	Rajauli	Bhadausi	91	294	48
243990	Sahra Bataura	Mapho	1120	2496	391
Total			9259.9	48346	7323

== Sheikhpura ==
There are 90 villages in Sheikhpura block as per 2011 census of India. The following is a list of villages in Sheikhpura block.

List of Villages
Village Code	Village	Gram Panchayat	Area (Hectare)	Population (2011)	Households (2011)
243909	Abe Badshahpur	Audhey	11	787	132
243958	Abgil	Puraina	320	2380	324
243951	Aijhi	Katari	213	1699	290
243940	Aima Matokhar	Kare	6.2	0	0
243982	Akauna	Gagari	66	621	104
243934	Amanatpur	Kusumbha	90	954	177
243927	Arazi Dhaunsa	Lodipur	13	0	0
243930	Arazigangti	Kosra	6.9	0	0
243912	Audhe	Audhey	121	2212	408
243911	Badshahpur	Audhey	94	1275	218
243967	Bagola	Pachna	65.2	0	0
243962	Bahadurpur	Pachna	85.2	0	0
243932	Bakarpur Bank	Kusumbha	222.2	1291	213
243928	Ballapur	Lodipur	16.4	0	0
243986	Bariarpur	Gagari	88.6	0	0
243903	Barki Milki	Gaway	2	0	0
243978	Barma	Kaithwan	298.3	1953	346
243966	Barui	Pachna	188.2	2183	327
243955	Bazidpur	Kare	119	2638	351
243901	Bhadeli	Kosra	51.2	945	138
243977	Bhat Chak	Kaithwan	13	529	114
243943	Bihta	Audhey	110	1929	269
243918	Bitha	Audhey	12.4	0	0
243965	Chak Ambia	Pachna	51.3	0	0
243964	Chak Batol	Pachna	10.9	0	0
243936	Chak Dewara	Lodipur	7.7	0	0
243914	Chak Maldah	Audhey	20	283	34
243923	Chak Wasia	Lodipur	14.2	0	0
243957	Chanre	Puraina	382	3135	418
243904	Chhotki Milki	Gaway	1.2	40	6
243949	Chitaura	Mehuns	73	607	105
243929	Deole	Lodipur	235	2092	328
243935	Dewara	Lodipur	236	955	127
243953	Dharampur	Hathiyawan	80	1434	243
243926	Dhaunsa	Lodipur	242.1	2495	408
243919	Dihri	Pain	169	1473	251
243916	Dullapur	Audhey	117	1602	201
243915	Faridpur	Audhey	89	2004	326
243981	Gagari	Gagari	272	1837	311
243931	Gangti	Kosra	87	528	96
243959	Garaia	Pachna	37.2	0	0
243910	Gawa	Gaway	621.1	7431	1197
243946	Gokhulpur	Hathiyawan	49.1	0	0
243983	Gunesa	Gagari	132	990	146
243980	Hansauri	Gagari	142	750	119
243947	Hathiawan	Hathuyawan	172	3349	550
243969	Jaimangla	Mahsar	387	2066	286
243975	Kaithawan	Kaithwan	613.1	3744	572
243907	Kamta	Hathiyawan	1	0	0
243908	Kamta	Hathiyawan	145	1236	233
243942	Kare	Kare	326.5	6206	969
243939	Kariho	Kare	81.8	1538	231
243956	Katari	Katari	495	5582	966
243961	Khurrampur		164.1	1374	212
243900	Kosra	Kosra	765.1	6707	1097
243960	Kunda		83	188	37
243988	Karauni	Mehuns	262	1204	198
243933	Kusmaha	Kusumbha	509	4292	724
243938	Lachhna	Kare	85	1069	154
243925	Lodipur	Lodipur	309	2382	357
243971	Madari	Mahsar	155	1664	227
243968	Mahsar	Mahsar	449	2282	318
243944	Manana	Audhey	143.3	1201	207
243902	Maniauri	Gaway	255	2310	386
243973	Maninda	Kaithwan	347.7	1608	281
243937	Matokhar	Kare	391	2099	342
243987	Mehuns	Mehuns	672	6215	993
243906	Milki	Gaway	12	104	18
243913	Milki	Pain	6.1	0	0
243917	Milki	Audhey	5	0	0
243920	Milki	Pain	8	0	0
243921	Milki	Pain	7.2	0	0
243950	Mobarakpur	Katari	178.1	1126	181
243963	Nirpur	Pachna	124	583	97
243970	Othma	Mahsar	118	897	128
243972	Pachnan		633	5565	821
243974	Paigambarpur	Kaithwan	176.9	1485	188
243922	Pain	Pain	526	3827	677
243924	Patrahta	Lodipur	102	467	82
243985	Pind	Gagari	103	1146	203
243989	Puraina	Puraina	559	3802	498
243945	Puran Kanwa	Hathiyawan	125.2	1737	309
243954	Ramraipur	Hathiyawan	89.4	1001	168
243948	Rasulpur	Hathiyawan	81	903	143
243984	Rudasi	Gagari	110	1050	174
243976	Sarari	Mahsar	214.2	1701	274
243905	Sarmanan	Gaway	89	1193	167
243952	Sonpahari	Katari	59.5	0	0
243979	Sultanpur	Gagari	127	946	172
243941	Surdaspur	Kare	185.4	1183	223
Total			15732.2	136084	21590

== Shekhopursarai ==
There are 30 villages in Shekhopursarai block as per 2011 census of India. The following is a list of villages in Shekhopursarai block.

List of Villages
Village Code	Village	Gram Panchayat	Area (Hectare)	Population (2011)	Households (2011)
243884	Ahmadpur	Ambari	45	471	58
243890	Amari	Ambari	514	5844	904
243891	Asthana	Onama	196	2269	376
243886	Baih Katta	(Note: Included in Shekhopursarai Nagar Panchayat in 2021)	83	658	114
243882	Bara Bigha		89	1136	140
243895	Belao	Belaw	793	8305	1443
243893	Biskorwa	Belaw	6	0	0
243894	Chak Usman	Belaw	37	0	0
243899	Charuanwan		304.2	6088	898
243885	Chheman	Ambari	98	2323	375
243870	Haidar Chak	Belaw	56	697	146
243898	Haidar Chak Kita Doem	Belaw	29	0	0
243896	Jahangirpur Urf Madhepur	Belaw	71	996	199
243887	Jalalpur Nimi		22	0	0
243889	Jodhan Bigha	Ambari	104	1569	204
243875	Khuria	Mohabbatpur	123	773	115
243881	Mian Bigha		96.1	876	123
243873	Mohabbatpur	Mohabbatpur	244	3768	575
243888	Mohammadpur Nimi		21	352	75
243874	Mohsimpur	Mohabbatpur	62	529	94
243879	Nimi		535	6193	1003
243880	Paharia		78	1497	247
243872	Panchi	Panchi	757	9302	1625
243876	Panhesa	Mohabbatpur	148.1	1461	224
243871	Rahincha	Panchi	80	940	170
243883	Sadikpur	Ambari	166	1541	224
243877	Shekhupursarai		193	3966	680
243897	Subhanpur Kaseri Chak	Belaw	37	246	46
243878	Sugia		90	1982	294
243892	Unaman	Onama	455	3699	592
Total			5,532.4	67,481	10,944

== See also ==
- Lists of villages in Bihar
