= Asthawan railway station =

Railway station in Nalanda, Bihar, India

General information
- Location: Asthawan, Nalanda, Bihar; India
- Coordinates: 25°13′52″N 85°37′55″E
- Elevation: 54 metres (177 ft)
- System: Indian Railways station
- Owner: Indian Railways
- Operator: East Central Railway zone
- Line: Neora–Daniyawan–Bihar Sharif–Sheikhpura line
- Platforms: 3
- Tracks: 1
- Connections: Bihar Sharif; Rajgir

Construction
- Structure type: Standard (on-ground station)
- Parking: Available

Other information
- Status: Functioning
- Station code: ATWN
- Zone(s): East Central Railway
- Division(s): Danapur division

History
- Opened: 2025
- Electrified: 2025
Location
- Location within Bihar

Asthawan railway station, station code ATWN, is a railway station and under Danapur railway division of East Central Railway. The station is located in Asthawan town between Bihar Sharif city and Barbigha town in Nalanda district in the Indian state of Bihar. The station is located 54 metres above the sea level. Asthawan is connected to metropolitan areas of India, by the Neora-Daniyawan-Bihar Sharif-Sheikhpura line. Asthawan is well connected with nearby cities Patna, Nawada, Bihar Sharif Junction, and Sheikhpura through daily passenger train services.

== History ==
The Asthawan railway station was made operational on 29 September 2025 after a gap of 23 years when this railway project was approved in 2002.The regular passenger train services were started from 1 October,2025. A new branch line between Neora railway station and Sheikhpura railway station via Neora, Jatdumri, Daniyawan, Bihar Sharif, Sheikhpura is now functional, in which Bihar Sharif–Daniyawan section was partially started in 2015.

== Structure ==
There are only three platforms in the Asthawan railway station. The platforms are interconnected with a single foot overbridge.

== Trains ==
63389/63390 Patna-Nawada Fast MEMU, runs via Daniyawan, Bihar Sharif, Barbigha and Sheikhpura.
