= Sarmera =

- town
- Location in Bihar, India
- Coordinates: 25.29682°N 85.81082°E
- Country: India
- State: Bihar
- Region: Magadh
- District: Nalanda

Government
  - Shri.: Kaushlendra kumar (MP), Jitendra Kumar (MLA, Asthawan (171))
- Elevation: 42 m (138 ft)

Population (2001)
  - Total: 96,441
- Time zone: UTC+5:30 (IST)
- PIN: 811104
- Telephone code: 916132
- ISO 3166 code: IN-BR
- Vehicle registration: BR21
- Sex ratio: 1000/892 ♂/♀
- Literacy: 53.64%
- Lok Sabha constituency: Nalanda
- Vidhan Sabha constituency: Asthawan(171)
- Climate: ETh (Köppen)
- Precipitation: 1,020 millimetres (40 in)
- Website: nalanda.nic.in

Sarmera is a town and a block in Nalanda district in the Indian state of Bihar. It is located 110 km east of Patna and is on the National Highway NH33 (linking Arwal to Mokameh and passes through Bihar Sharif) and State Highway SH78 (Bihta - Sarmera) connecting it to major cities in Bihar. Sarmera is a block in Nalanda district of Bihar, India and has nine panchayats namely Malawan, Kenar, Dhanuki, Mirnagar, Husaina, Sarmera, Chero, Narshinghpur, Sasaur and Isua. Major inhabited villages in Sarmera are Husena, Gopalbad, Brindawan, Pojh, Chero, Parnawa, Isua, Bari Malawan, Choti Malawan, Kenar, Mirnagar, Rupaspur, Sasaur, Dharampur and until 1943 it was ruled by royal family of Nalanda.

== Politics ==
Sarmera is a town and a block in Nalanda district in the Indian state of Bihar. nagar panchayat sarmera has 10 ward.

- Chairman ( sunny kumar )
- vice Chairman ( kanti devi )

ward 01 ( anupam kumar ) Ward 02 ( ) ward 03 (Manoj Kumar ) Ward 04 ( tripurari singh ) Ward 05 ( munna dhari ) Ward 06 ( Pallvee Kumari ) Ward 07 ( priti kumari ) Ward 08 (amita ) Ward 09 ( Ajay kumar ) Warsd 10 ( tarun kumar)

== Geography ==
Sarmera is situated on 20 km from the southern banks of the Ganges. The landscape is predominantly plain and the land strip along the north of Ganges is called Tal, which is the flood plain of river Ganges and submerges during monsoons.

== History ==
The recorded history of Sarmera dates back to Akbar's reign when the area was known as Gyaspur Pargana and was assigned to the Dhaulani Babhans (Bhumihars) who ruled Sarmera estate till independence when the estate was annexed and made a part of the Indian Union.First ancestor of dhaulani was Gang Rai and Gambhir Rai from Gyaspur pargana. Sarmera and areas around it was ruled by Bhumihar

== Economy ==
The main occupation is agriculture and agriculture related commercial activities. However, there are significant numbers of brick kilns along the road passing to this town. Main crops are lentils, chickpeas, mustard, rice and vegetables. Recently Sarmera is developing as a market and a trading place, however Barbigha still remains the major market of this region.

== Transport ==
Sarmera is connected to all the major cities of Bihar by road. New roads are being constructed at fast pace.Railway Line and Railway stations are at final stage of construction with Railway Line connecting to Gaya, Bihar Sharif and Patna.

== Demographics ==
As of 2001 India census, Sarmera had a population of 18.708. Males constitute 53% of the population and females 47%. Sarmera block, which constitutes 9 panchayats, has a population of 78,610. Sarmera has a literacy rate of 68.54%, lower than the national average of 69.5%: male literacy is 69%, and female literacy is 52%.

== People and Culture ==
Most people speak Magadhi here, a dialect called Magahi locally. However, it changes considerably across a couple of Kilometres. Families are very traditional, and often large.Many of the youngsters have out migrated from here for job opportunities.However, as people are getting education, they are becoming liberal.Caste system is ingrained in the social fabric of the place in the same way as it exists in other parts of Bihar. Consequently, caste based politics plays an important role in the life of the people here. The continuously diminishing infrastructure and unemployment have forced the people to migrate to other parts of India for better opportunities.Infrastructural development is now started happening but it would definitely take a good period of time to fulfill necessary infrastructural needs. The common attire of the people includes dhoti, kurta and gamchha, a large rectangular cotton cloth on their shoulders or tied round heads. Women dress in sarees. The most awaited and widely celebrated festival is Chhath, a festival where people worship the setting and the rising Sun in the month of October/November.
