= Barbigha railway station =

Railway station in Sheikhpura, Bihar, India

Barbigha

General information
- Location: Barbigha, Sheikhpura, Bihar; India
- Coordinates: 25°07′51″N 85°51′09″E
- Elevation: 51 metres (167 ft)
- System: Indian Railways
- Owner: Indian Railways
- Operator: East Central Railway
- Line: Neora–Daniyawan–Bihar Sharif–Sheikhpura line
- Platforms: 2
- Tracks: 1

Construction
- Structure type: Standard (on-ground station)
- Parking: Available

Other information
- Status: Functioning
- Station code: BRBG
- Zone(s): East Central Railway

History
- Opened: 2025
- Electrified: 2025

Services
East Central Railway
| Preceding station | Indian Railways | Following station |
|---|---|---|
| Amanwan towards Neora | Neora–Daniyawan–Bihar Sharif–Sheikhpura line | Sarsa Jamalpur towards Sheikhpura Junction |
Location
- Location within Bihar

Barbigha railway station (station code: BRBG), is a railway station under Danapur railway division of East Central Railway.The station is located 51 metres above the sea level. Barbigha is connected to metropolitan areas of India, by the Neora-Daniyawan-Bihar Sharif-Sheikhpura line. The station is located in Barbigha town in Sheikhpura district in the Indian state of Bihar. Barbigha is well connected with nearby cities Patna, Nawada, Bihar Sharif Junction, and Sheikhpura through daily passenger train services.

== History ==
The Barbigha railway station was made operational on 29 September 2025 after a gap of 23 years when this railway project was approved in 2002.The regular passenger train services were started from 1 October,2025. A new branch line between Neora railway station and Sheikhpura railway station via Neora, Jatdumri, Daniyawan, Bihar Sharif, Sheikhpura is now functional, in which Bihar Sharif–Daniyawan section was partially started in 2015.

== Structure ==
There are only two platforms in the Barbigha railway station. The platforms are interconnected with a single foot overbridge.

== Trains ==
63389/63390 Patna-Nawada Fast MEMU, runs via Daniyawan, Bihar Sharif, Barbigha and Sheikhpura.

== Nearest airports ==
The nearest airports to Sheikhpura junction are:

1. Lok Nayak Jayaprakash Airport, Patna 123.36 kilometres (76.65 mi)
2. Gaya Airport 116.6 kilometres (72.5 mi)
