= Matokhar railway station =

Railway station in Sheikhpura, Bihar, India

Matokhar

General information
- Location: Matokhar, Sheikhpura, Bihar; India
- Coordinates: 25°07′55″N 85°48′23″E
- Elevation: 51 metres (167 ft)
- System: Indian Railways
- Owner: Indian Railways
- Operator: East Central Railway
- Line: Neora–Daniyawan–Bihar Sharif–Sheikhpura line
- Platforms: 1
- Tracks: 1

Construction
- Structure type: Standard (on-ground station)
- Parking: Available

Other information
- Status: Functioning
- Station code: MTKR
- Zone(s): East Central Railway

History
- Opened: 2025
- Electrified: 2025

Services
East Central Railway
Preceding station	Indian Railways	Following station
Sarsa Jamalpur towards Neora	Neora–Daniyawan–Bihar Sharif–Sheikhpura line	Sheikhpura Junction Terminus
Location
- Location within Bihar

Matokhar railway station (station code: MTKR), is a railway station under Danapur railway division of East Central Railway.The station is located 51 metres above the sea level. Matokhar is connected to metropolitan areas of India, by the Neora-Daniyawan-Bihar Sharif-Sheikhpura line. The station is located in Sheikhpura district in the Indian state of Bihar. Matokhar is well connected with nearby cities Patna, Nawada, Bihar Sharif Junction, and Sheikhpura through daily passenger train services.

== History ==
The Matokhar railway station was made operational on 29 September 2025 after a gap of 23 years when this railway project was approved in 2002.The regular passenger train services were started from 1 October,2025. The new branch line between Neora railway station and Sheikhpura railway station via Neora, Jatdumri, Daniyawan, Bihar Sharif, Sheikhpura is now functional, in which Bihar Sharif–Daniyawan section was partially started in 2015.

== Structure ==
There is only one platform in the Matokhar railway station.

== Trains ==
63389/63390 Patna-Nawada Fast MEMU, runs via Daniyawan, Bihar Sharif, Barbigha, Matokhar and Sheikhpura.
