= National Highway 133B (India) =

National highway in India

National Highway 133B

Route information
- Length: 116 km (72 mi)

Major junctions
- West end: Sahibganj
- East end: Mehsi

Location
- Country: India
- States: Jharkhand, Bihar

Highway system
- Roads in India; Expressways; National; State; Asian
← NH 133A	→ NH 333

National Highway 133B, commonly referred to as NH 133B is a national highway in India. It is a spur road of National Highway 33. NH-333B traverses the states of Jharkhand and Bihar in India.

== Project cost ==
The estimated development cost of this new national highway is ₹1,954.77 crores including 6 km long Manihari bypass road. This also includes cost of land acquisition, resettlement and rehabilitation and other pre-construction activities.

== Route ==
Jharkhand

Sahibganj (NH-33)- Bihar Border.

Bihar

Manihari, Katihar, Darbhanga, Mehsi

== Sahibganj-Manihari Ganga bridge ==
This short national highway will connects these two cities via a 4 lane bridge across river Ganga. The foundation stone of this bridge was laid on 6 April 2017, by prime minister of India.

== Junctions ==
NH 33 Terminal near Sahibganj.
NH 131A Terminal near Mehsi.

== See also ==
- List of national highways in India
- List of national highways in India by state
