= Chakandra =

Village in Sheikhpura, Bihar, India

- Village
- Chakandra
- Interactive map of Chakandra
- Country: India
- State: Bihar
- District: Sheikhpura district
- Block: Chewara

Government
  - Member of Legislative Assembly: Vijay Kumar (Rashtriya Janata Dal)

Chakandra is an Indian village in Sheikhpura district, Bihar state, India.
