= Eksari Halt railway station =

Railway station in Bihar

Eksari Halt

General information
- Location: Eksari, Sheikhpura, Sheikhpura district, Bihar; India
- Coordinates: 25.134973°N 85.889325°E
- Elevation: 48 metres (157 ft)
- System: Passenger train Station
- Owner: Indian Railways
- Line: Gaya–Kiul line
- Platforms: 1
- Tracks: 2

Construction
- Structure type: Standard (on-ground station)

Other information
- Status: Functioning
- Station code: EKH
- Zone(s): East Central Railway zone
- Division(s): Danapur

History
- Opened: 1879; 147 years ago
- Electrified: 2018
- Former names: East Indian Railway

Services
| Preceding station | Indian Railways | Following station |
|---|---|---|
| Sheikhpura towards ? | East Central Railway zone Gaya–Kiul line | Adarsh Manpur towards ? |
Location

Eksari Halt railway station (station code: EKH), is a halt railway station on Gaya–Kiul line of Delhi–Kolkata Main Line in East Central Railway zone under Danapur railway division of the Indian Railways. The railway station is situated at Eksari, Sheikhpura in Sheikhpura district, in the Indian state of Bihar.
