= National Highway 333A (India) =

National highway in India

National Highway 333A
- Map of National Highway 333A in red
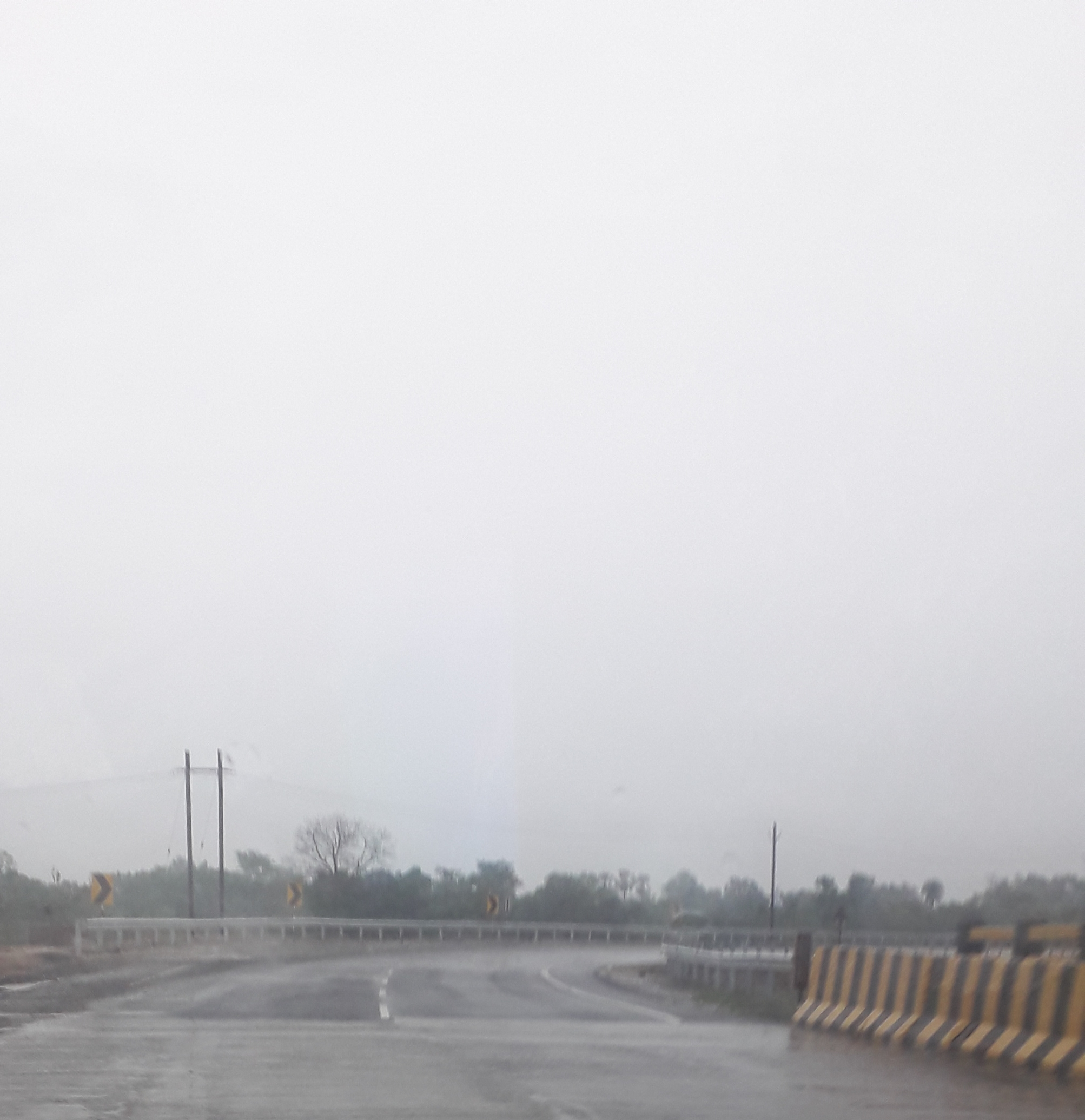
- NH333A

Route information
- Auxiliary route of NH 33
- Length: 296.4 km (184.2 mi)

Major junctions
- West end: Barbigha
- East end: Banka

Location
- Country: India
- States: Bihar, Jharkhand
- Primary destinations: Sheikhpura, Jamui, Banka,

Highway system
- Roads in India; Expressways; National; State; Asian
← NH 33	→ NH 33

National Highway 333A, commonly referred to as NH 333A is a national highway in India. It is a spur road of National Highway 33. NH-333A traverses the states of Bihar and Jharkhand in India.

== Route ==
Bihar

Barbigha - Shekhpura, Sikandra, Jamui, Jha-Jha, Banka - Jharkhand Border.

Jharkhand

Bihar Border- Godda, Suderpahari, Litipara, Pakur.

== Junctions ==
NH 33 Terminal near Barbigha.
NH 333 near Jamui.
NH 133 near Godda.
NH 133A Terminal near Pakur.

== See also ==
- List of national highways in India
- List of national highways in India by state
