= Nagdih =

Coordinates: 25°10′N 85°46′E

Nagdih is a village in the Sheikhpura district of Bihar, India.

== Etymology of the name ==
The name Nagdih is derived from the words ‘‘NAG" and "Dih" meaning "The house of the Snake". The phrase was used to describe the inhabitants of this village, who were said to be very strong and brave. The village was inhabited during medieval times.

== History ==
The majority of the village's inhabitants have been a part of the Kurmi community since the 18th century. Following the decline of Mughal rule in the early 18th century, the Indian subcontinent's hinterland dwellers, many of whom were armed and nomadic, began to appear more frequently in settled areas and interact with townspeople and agriculturists. The Kurmi were known for being cultivators and market gardeners. The main reason for this was the significant productivity of the Kurmi, whose success lay in superior use of manure, according to historian Christopher Bayly.

== Geography and climate ==
Nagdih is located on highly fertile flat land. It is drained by the canal and Motor-Pumps.

The lowest winter temperatures in Nagdih range between 5 and 10 °C (41 and 50 °F). The winter months are December and January. Average high temperatures in the summer are around 35 to 40 °C (95 to 104 °F). April to mid June are the hottest months. The monsoon months of June, July, August, and September see heavy rainfall. October, November, February and March are said to have a more pleasant climate.

== Population ==
Nagdih consists of 210 households and has a population of 2176.

== Education ==
Nagdih Primary School is the village's primary school
