= National Highway 133A (India) =

National highway in India

National Highway 133A
- Map of National Highway 133A in red

Route information
- Length: 52 km (32 mi)

Major junctions
- South end: Barharwa
- North end: Nimtala

Location
- Country: India
- States: Jharkhand, West Bengal
- Primary destinations: Barharwa, Pakur, Nimtala

Highway system
- Roads in India; Expressways; National; State; Asian
← NH 133	→ NH 133B

National Highway 133A, commonly called NH 133A is a national highway in India. It is a spur road of National Highway 33. NH-133A traverses the states of Jharkhand and West Bengal in India.

== Route ==
Barharwa, Pakur, Nimtala

== Junctions ==
Terminal with National Highway 33 near Barharwa. Terminal with National Highway 12 near Nimtala.

== Upgradation project ==
The National Highway Authority of India i.e. NHAI has planned upgradation of this highway into end to end 4 lane road with extension to join Belepukur on National Highway 12 via Ambhua. Another section of this highway will join Nalhati on National Highway 12 running via Pakur & Murarai. This will enhance road connectivity between Bhagalpur & Kolkata. Ministry of Road Transport and Highways has already approved upgrading of this highway.

== See also ==
- List of national highways in India
