= Kurauni =

Village in Sheikhpura, Bihar, India

Coordinates: 25.193°N 85.858°E

Kurauni Kurhani
- Village
- Interactive map of Kurauni
- Country: India
- State: Bihar
- District: Sheikhpura

Government
  - Loksabha MP for Nawada: Chandan Singh
  - MLA for Barbigha: Sudarshan Kumar

Area
  - Total: 262 km^{2} (101 sq mi)

Population (2011)
  - Total: 1,204
  - Density: 4.60/km^{2} (11.9/sq mi)
- Time zone: UTC+5:30 (IST)
- PIN: 811102
- Area code: 06334

Kurauni is a village of India, which is located at Sheikhpura District in Bihar State in India. The old name of the village is Kurhani. The village comes in Mehus Panchyat, Police station is Korma, post office is Katri, Block Sheikhpura, Loksabha Member of Parliament (MP) Constituency is Nawada and Current MP is Vivek Thakur and Ex. MP is Chandan Singh and Member of the Legislative Assembly (MLA) Seat Area is Barbigha And Current MLA is Dr. Kumar Pushpanjay and Ex MLA is Sudarshan Kumar. The total population of the village was 1,043 as per 2001 census report but it increased in 2011 and today's total population of village is 1469. The market of the village is Sheikhpura, Barbigha.

== Education ==
- Utkarmit Madhya Vidyalaya, Kurauni from 1 to class 8
- High School, Katari from class 8 to class 10
- S. S. College, Mehus
- CNB College, Hathiyawan
- Aaganwadi Kendra for class PG to UKG.

== Temples ==
- Bhagwati Sthan, the oldest temple of the village
- Shiv Temple
- Hanuman Temple
- A land where some statue of God comes out from a tree

== Health ==
- Sub Health Center, Kurauni

== Travel and transport ==
The village can be reached by road and by rail

== See also ==
List of villages in Sheikhpura district
