= Adarsh Manpur railway station =

Railway station in Bihar, India

Adarsh Manpur

General information
- Location: Pachna Paigambarpur Road, Manpur, Sheikhpura district, Bihar; India
- Coordinates: 25.134476°N 85.911063°E
- Elevation: 47 metres (154 ft)
- System: Passenger train Station
- Owner: Indian Railways
- Line: Gaya–Kiul line
- Platforms: 1
- Tracks: 2

Construction
- Structure type: Standard (on-ground station)

Other information
- Status: Functioning
- Station code: AHMP
- Zone(s): East Central Railway zone
- Division(s): Danapur

History
- Opened: 1879; 147 years ago
- Electrified: 2018
- Former names: East Indian Railway

Services
Preceding station	Indian Railways	Following station
Eksari Halt towards ?	East Central Railway zone Gaya–Kiul line	Sirari towards ?
Location

Adarsh Manpur railway station (station code: AHMP), is a railway station on Gaya–Kiul line of Delhi–Kolkata Main Line in East Central Railway zone under Danapur railway division of the Indian Railways. The railway station is situated beside Pachna Paigambarpur Road at Manpur in Sheikhpura district in the Indian state of Bihar.
