= Syed Muzaffaruddin Nadwi =

Indian-born Pakistani academic (1900–1984)

- Born: 1900; Maninda, near Sheikhpura, Bengal Presidency, British India
- Died: 18 June 1984 (aged 83–84); Karachi, Pakistan
- Resting place: Sakhi Hassan Graveyard, Karachi
- Education: Darul Uloom Nadwatul Ulama; Presidency College, Calcutta; University of Calcutta
- Occupations: Scholar; writer; educator; translator

Syed Muzaffaruddin Nadwi (1900–18 June 1984), also transliterated as Syed Muzaffar-ud-Din Nadvi or Syed Muzaffar Uddin Nadvi, was an Indian-born Pakistani Islamic scholar, writer, educator, and translator. He wrote works in Urdu and English, focusing on Islamic studies, history, and philosophy. Nadwi authored several books and translations, including on topics such as Islamic thought, comparative religion, and biographical studies. He was involved in both traditional Islamic scholarship and modern academic writing.

== Early life and education ==
Syed Muzaffaruddin Nadwi was born in 1900 in Maninda, near Sheikhpura, which at the time was part of the Bengal Presidency in British India (now in Sheikhpura district, Bihar, India). He studied at Darul Uloom Nadwatul Ulama in Lucknow and graduated in 1915 at the age of seventeen. During his studies at Nadwa, he benefited from scholars such as Syed Sulaiman Nadvi, Abdul Salam Nadvi, Muhammad Khalil Arab, as well as Shibli Nomani (Faqih-e-Awwal) and Shibli Nomani (Mutakallim). In the same year, he passed the Central Madrasa examination. After completing his traditional Islamic studies, he pursued modern education and earned a B.A. from Presidency College, Calcutta in 1922. He later obtained two M.A. degrees privately, one in Arabic (1925) and another in Persian (1927) from the University of Calcutta.

== Career ==
After his B.A., Nadwi worked at the University of Dhaka from 1922 to 1927. Between 1922 and 1924, he served as an assistant in Persian and Urdu, and from 1924 to 1927, he worked as a lecturer in Arabic and Persian. In 1927, he joined the Bengal Educational Service and served as a professor at Islamia College, Calcutta until 1943. After 1943, he was appointed at the Islamic Intermediate College in Chittagong, where he worked until 1944. In 1945, he was appointed as the Muslim Educational Officer of Bengal. However, the same year he returned to Islamia College, Calcutta, where he served as Vice Principal from 1946 to 1947. Following the partition of India, he became Principal of the Islamic Intermediate College in Chittagong, where he continued his educational work. Additionally, he served as Principal of S. N. College, Dinajpur, and as Assistant Director of Public Instruction in East Pakistan. After living for some years in East Pakistan (now Bangladesh), he migrated to West Pakistan (now Pakistan), eventually settling in Karachi.

== Literary works ==
Nadwi wrote in both Urdu and English, focusing on Islamic studies, philosophy, and history. His writing was noted for clarity and simplicity. In his article on Sufism, he criticized practices he believed to be deviations from original Islamic teachings and expressed concerns about widespread misconceptions regarding contemporary Sufi practices in India. According to Syed Sulaiman Nadvi, Muzaffaruddin Nadwi, despite holding an M.A. degree, consistently engaged in scholarly Islamic pursuits and wrote on contemporary issues in Islamic studies. Nadwi contributed a detailed and researched English-language article in The Islamic Review critically responding to Professor Nicholson's views on the origins and sources of Islamic mysticism (Sufism). Nicholson had argued that Sufism was not originally part of Islam but had come from external influences. Nadwi's article refuted this claim and was appreciated by knowledgeable scholars of his time.

His articles were published in various Urdu literary journals, including Ma'arif (Azamgarh), Nadeem (Gaya), Jadoo, and Urdu Jadeed (Calcutta). During his student years at Nadwa, he also edited a handwritten student magazine titled Muallim al-Sibyan (The Children's Instructor).

In Urdu, his notable work is a translation and commentary on the German philosopher Friedrich Nietzsche. The book, titled Nietzsche, is a translation of M. A. Mugge’s work and was published in 1926 by Darul Musannifin, Azamgarh, at the request of Syed Sulaiman Nadvi.

He translated Part II of Syed Sulaiman Nadwi’s Arz-ul-Quran into English in 1936, incorporating additional material and revisions, which was published under the title A Geographical History of the Quran.

Among his English works are:

- Muslim Thought and Its Source (1931)
- An Impartial Study of Nawab Siraj-ud-Dawla (1953)
- An Easy History of the Prophet of Islam (1954)
- Human Rights and Obligations (In the Light of the Qur'an and Hadith) (1966)
- A Comparative Study of Islam & Other Religions (1977)
- Islamic State of Pakistan
- Islami Taleem-o-Tarbiyat (in Urdu)

His works have also appeared in translation:

- Pashto: Islāmī fikar mākḫaẕ (1963)
- Turkish: Hazret-i Muhammed Aleyhisselam Hakkında Konferanslar (1967) by Osman Keski̇oğlu
- Indonesian: Pemikiran Muslim dan sumbernya (1984)
- Indonesian: Sejarah Geography Qur'an (1985) by Bambang Bujono
- Turkish: Kur'ān-ı Kerîm'de kavimler ve toplumlar (2003) by Abdullah Davudoğlu

== Death ==
Nadwi died on 18 June 1984 in Karachi, where he is buried in Sakhi Hassan Graveyard.
