= Sheikhpurwa =

Village in Sheikhpura, Bihar, India

Sheikhpurwa शेखपुरवा
- Village
- Country: India
- State: Bihar
- District: Sheikhpura
- Block: Barbigha
- Gram Panchayat: Kutaut

Government
  - Loksabha MP for Nawada: Chandan Singh
  - MLA for Barbigha: Kumar Puspanjay

Population (2011)
  - Total: 1,008
- Time zone: UTC+5:30 (IST)
- PIN: 811101
- Area code: 06341

Sheikhpurwa is a village located in the Barbigha block of Sheikhpura district of Bihar in India. The nearest market of the village is Barbigha.

== Population statistics ==
As of the 2011 census, Sheikhpurwa has a population of 1,008 people, where the male population is 529 and the female population is 479. The SC population constitutes about 0.50% of the total village population, while no ST population has been recorded in the census.

== Household information ==
There are approximately 153 households in Sheikhpurwa. The average household size in the village is about 6 persons per house.

== Administrative setup ==
Sheikhpurwa village comes under the jurisdiction of Kutaut Gram Panchyat, Police station is Barbigha, and post office is Pyarepur (811104). Sheikhpurwa is located in the 811101 postal area, contributing significantly to the rural administrative structure of Barbigha block. The village falls under the Barbigha Assembly and Parliament Constituency. The nearest town to Sheikhpurwa is Barbigha, which serves as the central hub for all major economic activities in the region.

== Nearby villages ==
- Dharseni
- Kutaut

== See also ==
- Lists of villages in Bihar
- Panchvadan Sthan
