= Baidrabad =

Baidrabad is a village in Arwal district of Bihar in India.

The present name of the village dates back to 1935. Magahi and Khariboli (a dialect of Hindi) are the main languages spoken here. The Son river passes near the village.

The nearest villages, cities and towns are Arwal, Bela, Udantapuri/Bihar Sharif, Ara, Aurangabad, Gaya and Patna. The PIN code is 804402.

In February 2025, the chief minister sancioned funds for construction of a road from Arwal bus stand to Baidrabad.
