= Syed Hasan (writer) =

Indian writer and scholar (1908–1988)

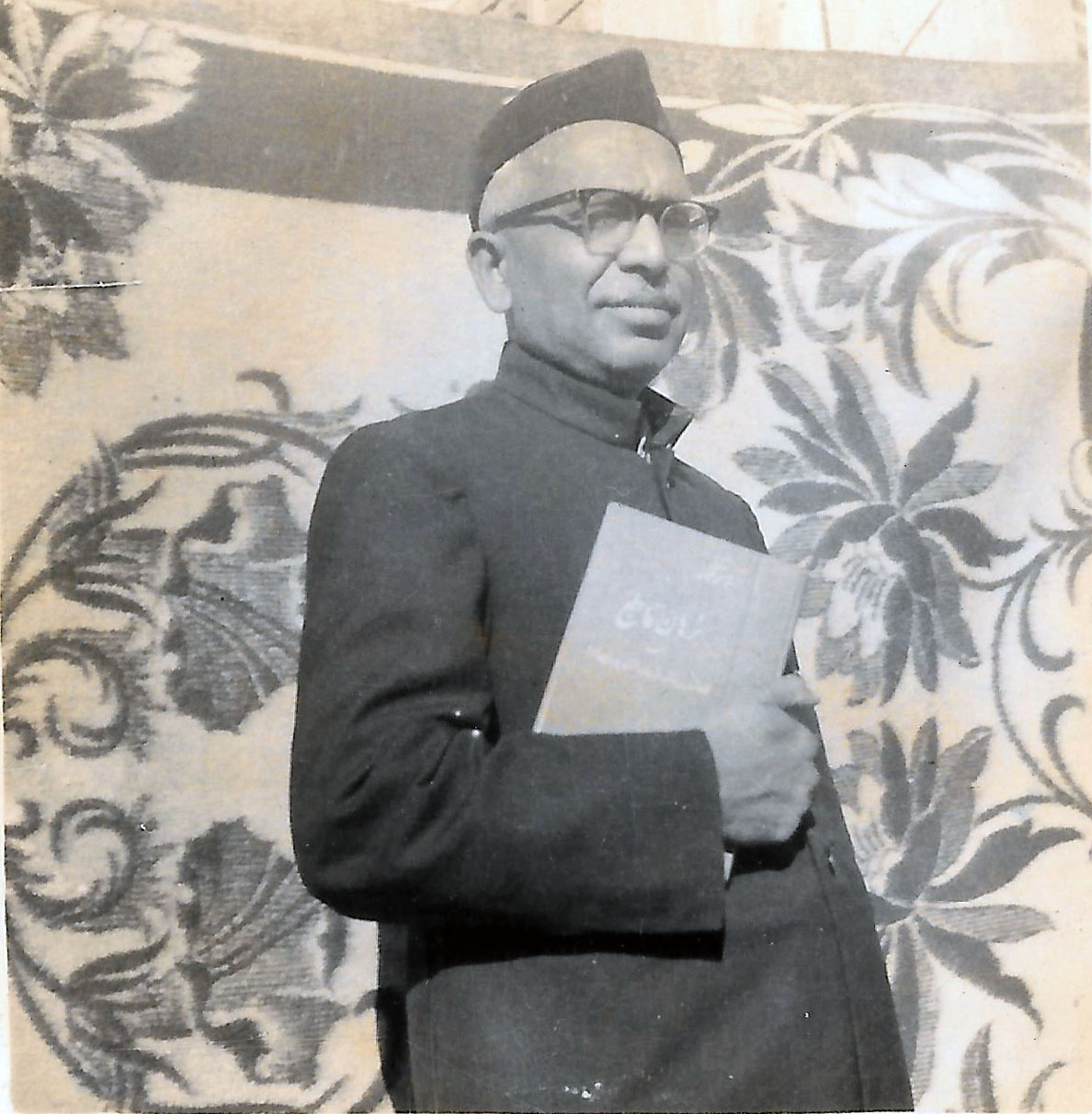
- Professor Syed Hasan
- Born: 1 January 1908
- Died: 18 November 1988 (aged 80)
- Education: Patna University
- Occupations: Director, professor
- Known for: Scholar
- Title: Professor
- Awards: Ghalib Award, Presidential Award of Certificate

Syed Hasan (1 January 1911–18 November 1988) was an Indian writer, scholar and professor of Persian language and literature from Patna, Bihar. He was a great scholar "steeped into Persian". He headed the Persian Department of Patna University from 1972 to 1978. In 1954–55, he was awarded a scholarship under the Government of India Foreign Languages Scholarships Scheme for Studying in Iran.

== Early life and education ==
Syed Hasan was born on 1 January 1911 to Syed Muhammad Yahya and Kaneez Fatima at Sheikhpura, Munger district (now Sheikhpura district) of Bihar.

== Publications ==
Book	Year	Description
Majmua-I-Ashaar of Mowlana Burhanuddin Shams Balki	1957	Published by the Institute of Post-graduate Studies and Research in Arabic & Persian Learning, Patna. (1957)
Silk kilk	1974	A collection of valuable research papers on Persian literature, published and edited by his student Dr. Sharfe Alam, ex Head of the Department of Persian B.N College
