= NH 114A =

NH 114A may refer to:

- National Highway 114A (India)
- New Hampshire Route 114A, United States
