= Purankama =

Purankama is a village in Sheikhpura district in the Indian state of Bihar. Magahi is the main language of this village. People also speak Hindi.Purankama comes in Ward Number 1 of Sheikhpura Nagar Parishad.
