= National Highway 333C (India) =

National highway in India

National Highway 333C

Route information
- Length: 16 km (9.9 mi)

Location
- Country: India
- States: Bihar

Highway system
- Roads in India; Expressways; National; State; Asian

National Highway 333C, commonly called NH 333C, is a national highway in the state of Bihar in India. It is a secondary route of National Highway 33.

== See also ==
- List of national highways in India
