= Sheikhpura Municipal Council =

Nagar Parshad in Sheikhpura, Bihar, India

Sheikhpura Municipal Council Nagar Parishad Sheikhpura

Type
- Type: Local Authority of the Sheikhpura

Leadership
- Chairperson: Rashmi Kumari
- Executive Officer: Vinay Kumar
- Seats: 33

Elections
- Last election: 2022

Meeting place
- Sheikhpura

Website
- https://www.sheikhpuramunicipal.com/

The Sheikhpura Municipal Council or Sheikhpura Nagar Parishad, is the civic body that governs Sheikhpura within Sheikhpura district of Bihar. Sheikhpura Municipal Council consists of democratically elected members, is headed by a Chairperson and administers the city's infrastructure, public services and supplies. Members from the state's leading various political parties hold elected offices in the council.

== History ==
It is the 1st town in Sheikhpura district to get Municipal Council status. In 2020, the nagar parishad area was expanded by including the 9 villages of 3 adjoining gram panchayats of Hathiyawan, Kare and Pachna.

== Administration ==
Sheikhpura Municipal Council consists of 33 Ward councillors including a chairperson and a deputy chairperson. It is under the direct control of Executive Officer.
