= Garsanda Halt railway station =

Railway station in Bihar

Garsanda Halt

General information
- Location: Bikam, Garsanda, Lakhisarai district, Bihar; India
- Coordinates: 25.142617°N 86.011307°E
- Elevation: 46 metres (151 ft)
- System: Passenger train Station
- Owner: Indian Railways
- Line: Gaya–Kiul line
- Platforms: 1
- Tracks: 2

Construction
- Structure type: Standard (on-ground station)

Other information
- Status: Functioning
- Station code: GSDH
- Zone(s): East Central Railway zone
- Division(s): Danapur

History
- Opened: 1879; 147 years ago
- Electrified: 2018
- Former names: East Indian Railway

Services
| Preceding station | Indian Railways | Following station |
|---|---|---|
| Kachhiyana Halt towards ? | East Central Railway zone Gaya–Kiul line | Karota Patri Halt towards ? |
Location

Garsanda Halt railway station (station code: GSDH), is a halt railway station on Gaya–Kiul line of Delhi–Kolkata Main Line in East Central Railway zone under Danapur railway division of the Indian Railways. The railway station is situated at Bikam, Garsanda in Lakhisarai district in the Indian state of Bihar.
