= Sirari railway station =

Railway station in Bihar

Sirari

General information
- Location: State Highway 6, Sirari, Sheikhpura district, Bihar; India
- Coordinates: 25.132853°N 85.952587°E
- Elevation: 47 metres (154 ft)
- System: Passenger train Station
- Owner: Indian Railways
- Operator: East Central Railway
- Line: Gaya–Kiul line
- Platforms: 2
- Tracks: 2

Construction
- Structure type: Standard (on-ground station)

Other information
- Status: Functioning
- Station code: SRY
- Zone(s): East Central Railway zone
- Division(s): Danapur

History
- Opened: 1879; 147 years ago
- Electrified: 2018

Services
Preceding station	Indian Railways	Following station
Adarsh Manpur towards ?	East Central Railway zone Gaya–Kiul line	Kachhiyana Halt towards ?
Location

Sirari railway station (station code: SRY), is a railway station on Gaya–Kiul line of Delhi–Kolkata Main Line in East Central Railway zone under Danapur railway division of the Indian Railways. The railway station is situated beside State Highway 6 at Sirari in Sheikhpura district in the Indian state of Bihar.
