= Kurauta Patner Halt railway station =

Railway station in Bihar

Kurauta Patner Halt

General information
- Location: State Highway 18, Patner, Lakhisarai district, Bihar; India
- Coordinates: 25.152409°N 86.037737°E
- Elevation: 47 metres (154 ft)
- System: Passenger train Station
- Owner: Indian Railways
- Line: Gaya–Kiul line
- Platforms: 2
- Tracks: 2

Construction
- Structure type: Standard (on-ground station)

Other information
- Status: Functioning
- Station code: KRTR
- Zone(s): East Central Railway zone
- Division(s): Danapur

History
- Opened: 1879; 147 years ago
- Electrified: 2018
- Former names: East Indian Railway

Services
Preceding station	Indian Railways	Following station
Garsanda Halt towards ?	East Central Railway zone Gaya–Kiul line	Lakhisarai Junction towards ?
Location

Kurauta Patner Halt railway station (station code: KRTR), is a railway station on Gaya–Kiul line of Delhi–Kolkata Main Line in East Central Railway zone under Danapur railway division of the Indian Railways. The railway station is situated beside State Highway 18 at Patner in Lakhisarai district in the Indian state of Bihar.
