= NH 33 =

NH 33 may refer to:

- National Highway 33 (India)
- New Hampshire Route 33 (U.S.)
