= Ghatkusumbha =

Block in Sheikhpura, Bihar, India

- Block
- Interactive map of Ghatkusumbha
- Coordinates: 25°13′25″N 85°49′26″E
- Country: India State
- District: Sheikhpura

Area
  - Total: 80.28 km^{2} (31.00 sq mi)

Population (2011)
  - Total: 48,346
  - Density: 602.2/km^{2} (1,560/sq mi)

Languages
  - Official: Magahi, Hindi
- Time zone: UTC+5:30 (IST)
- PIN: 811107
- ISO 3166 code: IN-BR
- Vehicle registration: BR-52
- Sex ratio: 918
- Lok Sabha constituency: Jamui (40)
- Vidhan Sabha constituency: Sheikhpura (169)
- Nearest railway station: Sheikhpura Junction

Ghatkusumha is a village and block in Sheikhpura district of Bihar. It is one of the 6 block within the Sheikhpura district.

== About ==
Ghat Kusumha is a block, located within Sheikhpura district of Bihar in India.
