= Shekhopursarai =

Block in Sheikhpura, Bihar, India

- Town
- Interactive map of Shekhopursarai
- Coordinates: 25°07′28″N 85°41′01″E
- Country: India State
- District: Sheikhpura
- Seat: Shekhopursarai Nagar Panchayat

Area
  - Total: 59.83 km^{2} (23.10 sq mi)

Population (2011)
  - Total: 67,481
  - Density: 1,128/km^{2} (2,921/sq mi)

Languages
  - Official: Magahi, Hindi
- Time zone: UTC+5:30 (IST)
- PIN: 811103
- ISO 3166 code: IN-BR
- Vehicle registration: BR-52
- Sex ratio: 918
- Lok Sabha constituency: Nawada (39)
- Vidhan Sabha constituency: Barbigha (170)
- Nearest railway station: Sheikhpura Junction
- Website: https://npshekhopursarai.com/

Shekhopursarai is a town and municipality in Sheikhpura district of Bihar. It is a block within the Sheikhpura district.

== About ==
Shekhopusarai is a newly emerged urban area in Sheikhpura district of Bihar. Shekhopusarai gram panchayat was created on March 3, 2021 by including 10 nearby villages in the Shekhopursarai block of Sheikhpura district of Bihar.

== Demographics ==
As per the 2011 census, the area was rural in nature as all the population lived under the jurisdiction of Panchayati Raj Institutions, meant for rural areas. Shekhopursarai gram panchayat's population is 3,966. There were a total of 680 households in the panchayat. It has an area of 193 hectares.
