= Kachhiyana Halt railway station =

Railway station in Bihar

Kachhiyana Halt

General information
- Location: State Highway 6, Chewara, Lakhisarai district, Bihar; India
- Coordinates: 25.133117°N 85.980111°E
- Elevation: 45 metres (148 ft)
- System: Passenger train Station
- Owner: Indian Railways
- Line: Gaya–Kiul line
- Platforms: 1
- Tracks: 2

Construction
- Structure type: Standard (on-ground station)

Other information
- Status: Functioning
- Station code: KCYN
- Zone(s): East Central Railway zone
- Division(s): Danapur

History
- Opened: 1879; 147 years ago
- Electrified: 2018
- Former names: East Indian Railway

Services
| Preceding station | Indian Railways | Following station |
|---|---|---|
| Sirari towards ? | East Central Railway zone Gaya–Kiul line | Garsanda Halt towards ? |
Location

Kachhiyana Halt railway station (station code: KCYN), is a halt railway station on Gaya–Kiul line of Delhi–Kolkata Main Line in East Central Railway zone under Danapur railway division of the Indian Railways. The railway station is situated beside State Highway 6 at Chewara in Lakhisarai district in the Indian state of Bihar.
