= Barbigha Municipal Council =

Nagar Parshad in Sheikhpura, Bihar, India

Barbigha Municipal Council Nagar Parishad Barbigha

Type
- Type: Local Authority of the Barbigha

History
- Founded: 2017

Leadership
- Chairperson: Shonu kumar
- Executive Officer: Sandeep kumar
- Seats: 28

Elections
- Last election: 2022

Meeting place
- Barbigha

The Barbigha Municipal Council or Barbigha Nagar Parishad, is the civic body that governs Barbigha within Sheikhpura district of Bihar. Barbigha Municipal Council consists of democratically elected members, is headed by a Chairperson and administers the city's infrastructure, public services and supplies. Members from the state's leading various political parties hold elected offices in the council.

== History ==
Earlier Barbigha had nagar panchayat status. In 2017, Barbigha Nagar Panchayat was promoted to Barbigha Municipal Council or Barbigha Nagar Parishad. It is the 2nd town in Sheikhpura district to get Municipal Council status. In 2020, the nagar parishad area was expanded by including all the villages of adjoining gram panchayats of Jagdishpur, Samas Khurd and Teus.

== Administration ==
Barbigha Municipal Council consists of 26 Ward councillors including a chairperson and a deputy chairperson. It is under the direct control of Executive Officer.

== Economy ==
The annual budget of Barbigha Nagar Parishad for FY 2025-26 was about 253 crores.
