= Asthawan =

Town and Block in Nalanda district of Bihar

- Town
- Location in Bihar, India
- Coordinates: 25°12′58″N 85°37′31″E
- Country: India
- State: Bihar
- District: Nalanda
- Seat: Asthawan Nagar Panchayat

Population (2011)
  - Total: 14,061

Languages
  - Official: Magahi, Hindi
- Time zone: UTC+5:30 (IST)
- PIN: 803107
- Telephone code: 06112
- ISO 3166 code: IN-BR
- Vehicle registration: BR-21
- Sex ratio: 1000/909 ♂/♀
- Literacy: 64.91%
- Lok Sabha constituency: Nalanda
- Vidhan Sabha constituency: Asthawan
- Nearest railway station: Asthawan

Asthawan is one of the 20 blocks located in Nalanda district in rural Bihar. According to the administration register, the block code of Asthawan is 373.

== History ==
Asthawan approved as Nagar Panchayat by Bihar Government

== Population ==
According to the 2011 census, the population here was about 14 thousand. At present the population of Asthawan Nagar panchayat is more than 17 thousand. Asthawan, Akbarpur, Soyvapar, Srichandpur, Amir Bigha, Gafoor Bigha, Tar Bigha and Nanhu Bigha villages come in this Nagar Panchayat

== Literacy Rate ==
Asthawan village has higher literacy rate compared to Bihar. In 2011, literacy rate of Asthawan village was 64.91 % compared to 61.80 % of Bihar. In Asthawan Male literacy stands at 75.57 % while female literacy rate was 53.16 %.

== Education ==
Following colleges, schools and educational institutions are located here

- Government Polytechnic Asthawan, Nalanda
- Nalanda Institute of Technology & Management

== Notable people ==
- Abdul Qavi Desnavi
- Manazir Ahsan Gilani
- Moin-ul-Haq
- Sulaiman Nadvi
- Siddheshwar Prasad
