= National Highway 114A (India) =

National highway in India

National Highway 114A
- Map of the National Highway in red
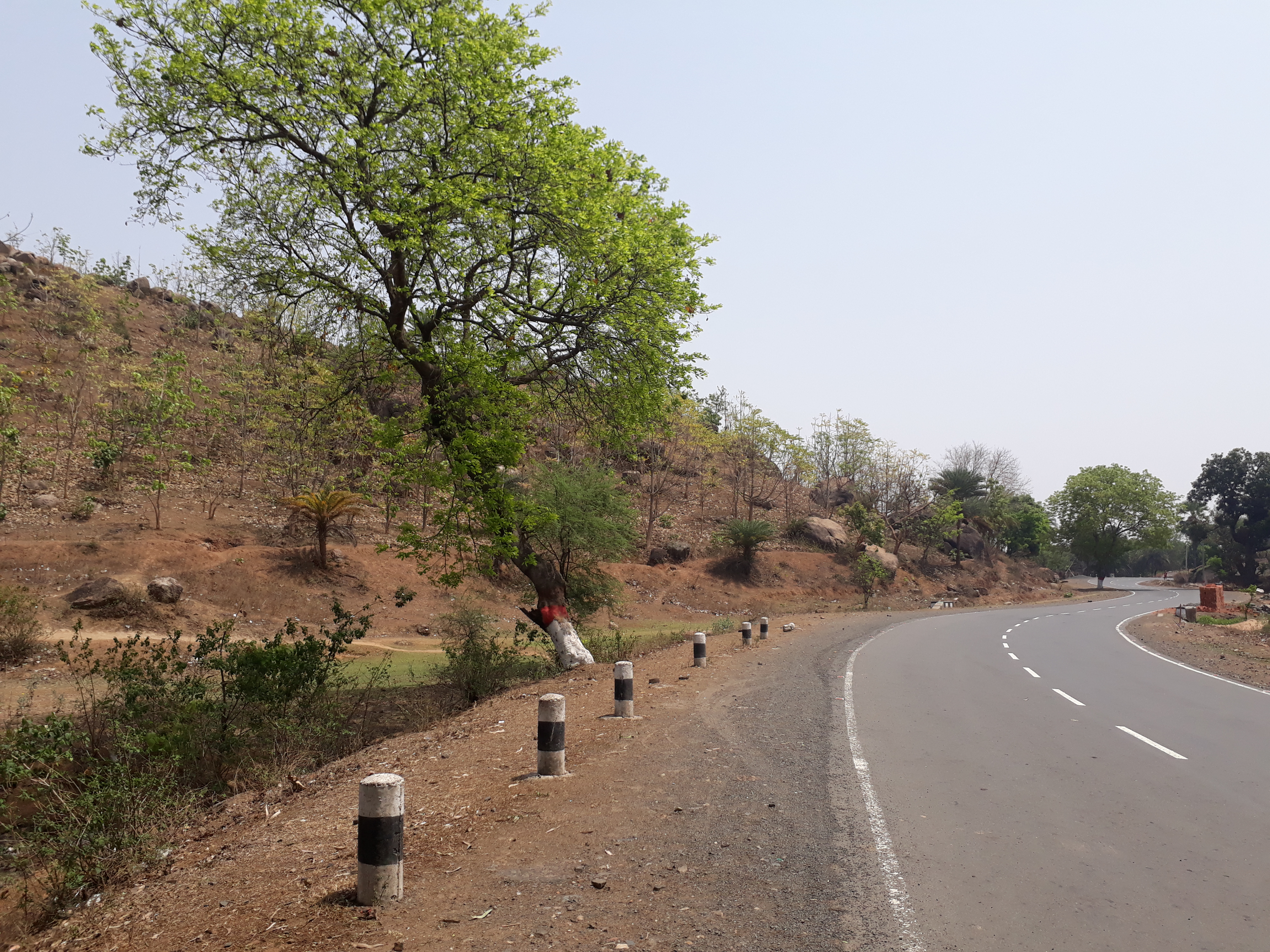
- Rampurhat to Dumka road

Route information
- Auxiliary route of NH 14
- Length: 310 km (190 mi)

Major junctions
- East end: Rampurhat
- West end: Dumri

Location
- Country: India
- States: West Bengal, Jharkhand

Highway system
- Roads in India; Expressways; National; State; Asian
← NH 14	→ NH 19

National Highway 114A, commonly referred to as NH 114A is a national highway in India. It is a spur road of National Highway 14. NH-114A traverses the states of West Bengal and Jharkhand in India.

== Route ==
Rampurhat, Sunrichua, Shikaripara, Dumka, Lakrapahari, Jama, Jarmundi, Choupa More, Deoghar, Sarath, Madhupur, Giridih, Dumri.

== Junctions ==
NH 14 terminal near Rampurhat.
NH 133 near Choupa More.
NH 333 near Deoghar.
NH 19 terminal near Dumri, Giridih.

== See also ==
- List of national highways in India
- List of national highways in India by state
