= Bihar Sharif Junction railway station =

Railway station in Nalanda, Bihar, India

BIHAR SHARIF JUNCTION बिहार शरीफ जंक्शन بِہار شریف جنکشن

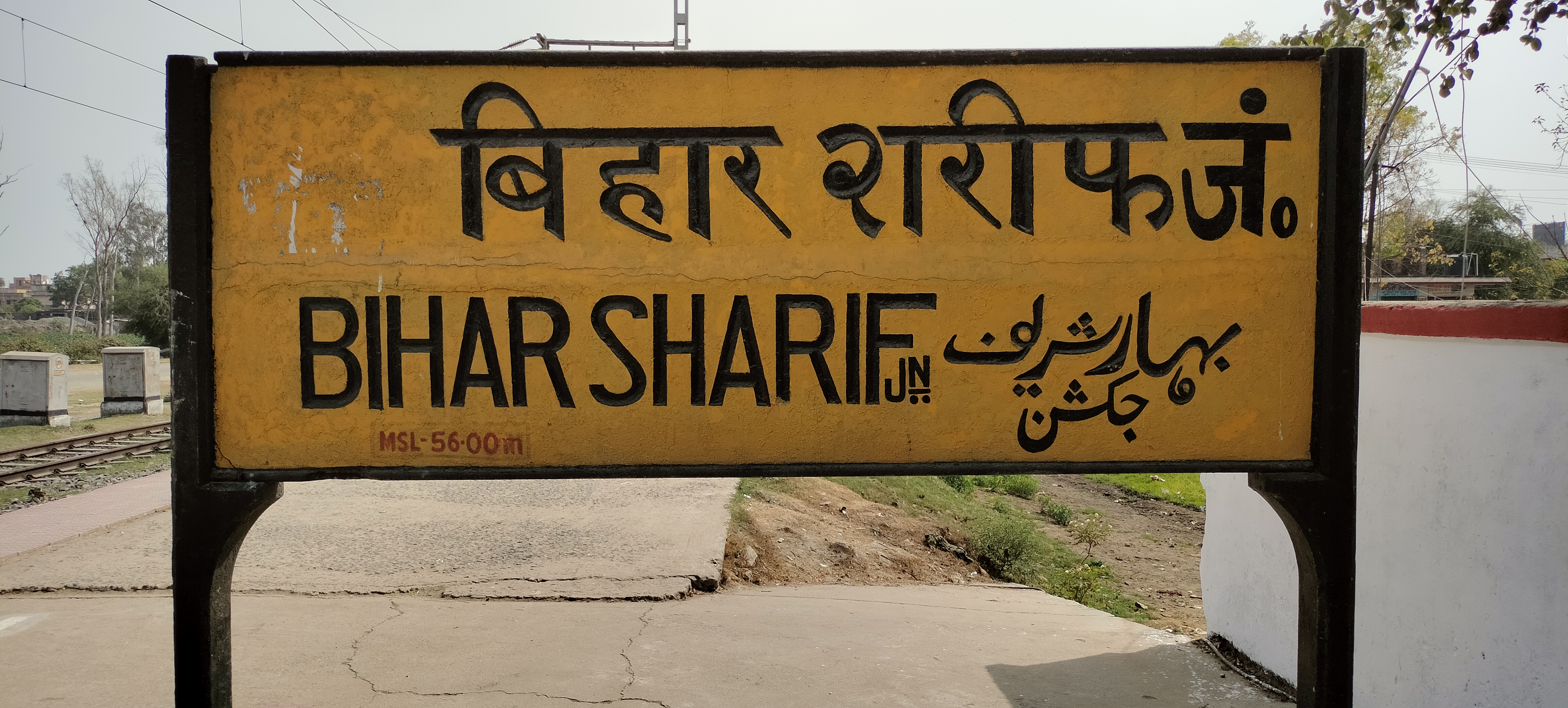
- Station platform board

General information
- Location: NH 33 (Old NH82), Bihar Sharif, Bihar; India
- Coordinates: 25°11′49″N 85°31′05″E
- Elevation: 56 metres (184 ft)
- System: Indian Railways station
- Owner: Indian Railways
- Operator: East Central Railway
- Lines: Bakhtiyarpur–Tilaiya line (extension to Koderma under construction); Neora–Jatdumari–Daniyawan–Bihar Sharif–Sheikhpura line (under construction); Bihar Sharif–Nawada line (planned); Bihar Sharif–Jehanabad line (planned)
- Platforms: 5
- Tracks: 5+1(Track/Machine Line)

Construction
- Structure type: Standard (on-ground station)
- Parking: Available

Other information
- Status: Functioning
- Station code: BEHS
- Zone(s): East Central Railway
- Division(s): Danapur
- Fare zone: East Central Railway

History
- Opened: 1903; 123 years ago
- Rebuilt: 1962; 64 years ago
- Electrified: 2017; 9 years ago

Passengers
- 2,392 per day
Services
East Central Railway zone
Preceding station	Indian Railways	Following station
Sohsarai towards Bakhtiyarpur Junction	Bakhtiyarpur–Tilaiya line	Tungi Halt towards Rajgir or Tilaiya
Sohsarai (under construction) towards Daniyawan Junction or Neora	Neora–Jatdumari–Daniyawan–Bihar Sharif–Sheikhpura line	Nepura (under construction) towards Sheikhpura
Route map
- Sources
Location
- Location within Bihar Location within India
- Interactive map

Bihar Sharif Junction railway station, station code BEHS, is a railway station under Danapur railway division of East Central Railway. Bihar sharif is connected to metropolitan areas of India, by the Delhi–Kolkata main line via Mughalsarai–Patna route. Station is located in Bihar Sharif city in Nalanda district in the Indian state of Bihar. Due to its location on the Bakhtiyarpur–Tilaiya line, many trains from Patna and other cities via Bakhtiyarpur Junction, and trains coming from Rajgir and Gaya Junction stops here. Bihar Sharif has well connected trains running frequently to New Delhi, Patna Junction, Varanasi Junction, and Howrah Junction and with nearby cities Gaya Junction, Rajgir railway station, Tilaiya railway station, Bhagalpur railway station, Kiul Junction through daily passenger and express train services.

Rail branch line between Neora railway station and Sheikhpura railway station via Neora, Jatdumri, Daniyawan, Bihar Sharif, Shiekhpura is under construction in which Bihar Sharif–Daniyawan section was partially started in 2015.

== History ==
Bakhtiyarpur Bihar Light Railway was a 2 ft 6 in (762 mm)-wide narrow-gauge railway laid by Martin's Light Railways from Bakhtiyarpur to Bihar Sharif in 1903 and extended to Rajgir in 1911. It was taken over by the local district board in 1950, nationalised in 1962 and converted to 1,676 mm (5 ft 6 in).

The broad-gauge line was extended from Rajgir to Tilaiya and opened in 2010. This line will transport coal from the Koderma–Hazaribagh coal belt for Barh Super Thermal Power Station via Harnaut station. The line was sanctioned in 2001–2002 and is to be extended up to Koderma, which is under construction. Feasibility studies for the electrification of the Manpur–Tilaiya–Kiul sector and Fatuha–Islampur and Bakhtiyarpur–Rajgir sectors were announced in the rail budget for 2010-2011. Bakhtiyarpur–Rajgir section has been electrified in 2016–2017, while Rajgir–Tilaiya–Gaya section has been electrified along with Kiul–Gaya section in 2017–2018. Bihar Sharif–Daniyawan section is electrified in 2019 and inaugurated on 17 Feb 2019 by Prime Minister Narendra Modi.

Survey work for doubling of Bakhtiyarpur–Tilaiya line has been completed and awaiting for green signal from Railway Safety Commissioner. A new line between Bihar Sharif, Pawapuri road station and Nawada has been planned and currently Engineering cum Traffic Survey is underprocess. This line will connect Nawada to Patna directly by train via Bihar Sharif also Nawada to Rajgir via Pawapuri road station. A new line between Bihar Sharif and Jehanabad also has been planned and currently Engineering cum Traffic Survey is under process. This line will connect Bihar Sharif to Jehanabad directly by train via Ekangarsarai.

== Structure ==
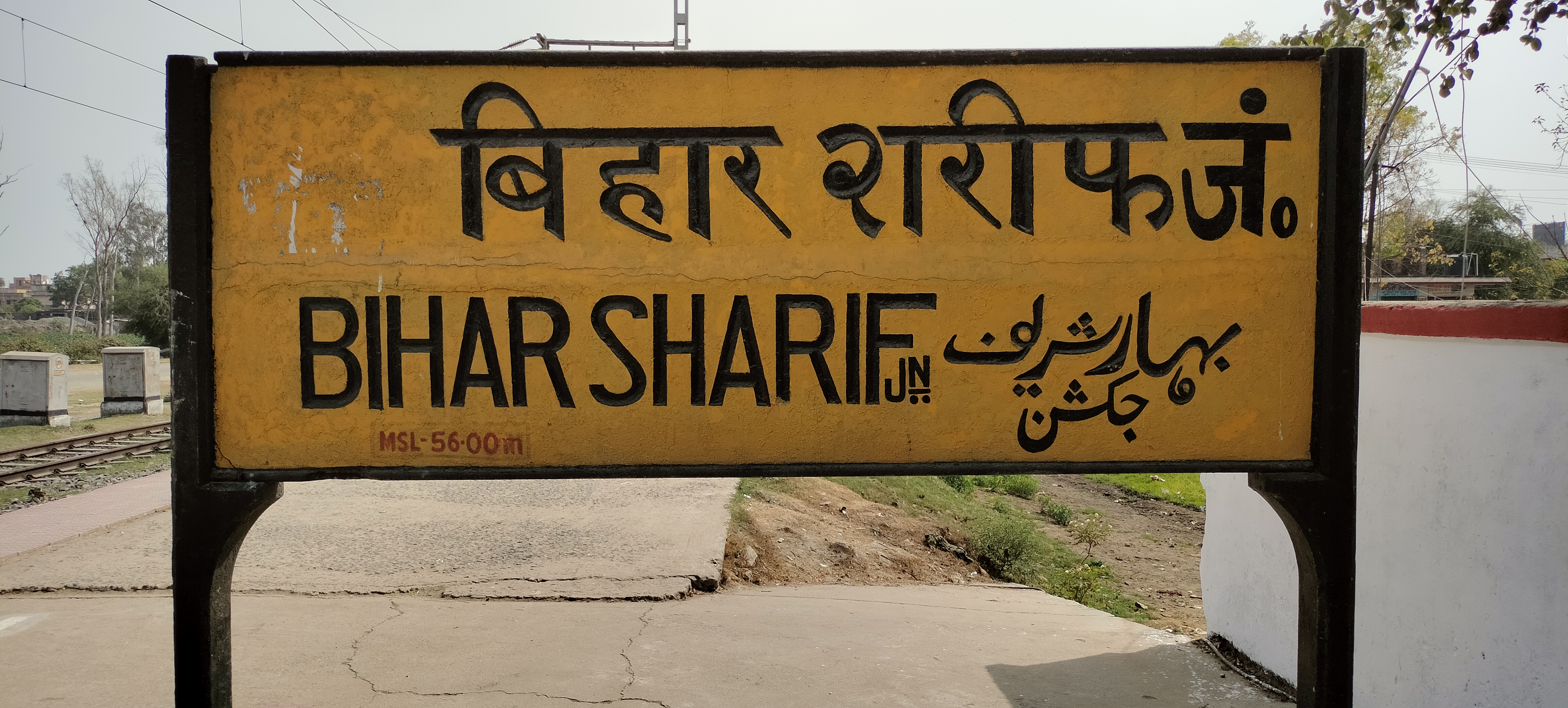
Station platform board

There are Five platforms in the Bihar Sharif Junction railway station And One Track/Machine Line Besides Platform 1. The platforms are interconnected with two foot overbridge and second foot overbridge is connecting platform number 1 to 5.

== Developments ==
In February 2012, the Indian Railways had planned to set up a Railway Station Development Corporation (RSDC) that will work on improving the major railway stations including Bihar Sharif by building and developing restaurants, shopping areas and food plazas for commercial business and improving passenger amenities. As of 2018, it was still under construction.

== Nearest airports ==
The nearest airports to Bihar Sharif junction are:

- Lok Nayak Jayaprakash Airport, Patna 66 kilometres (41 mi)
- Gaya Airport 95.7 kilometres (59.5 mi)

== See also ==
- Bihar Sharif Smart City
- Nalanda district
- Rajgir city
