= National Highway 333 (India) =

National highway in India

National Highway 333
- Map of National Highway 333 in red

Route information
- Length: 158 km (98 mi)

Major junctions
- North end: Munger
- South end: Deoghar

Location
- Country: India
- States: Bihar, Jharkhand

Highway system
- Roads in India; Expressways; National; State; Asian
← NH 33	→ NH 114A

National Highway 333, commonly referred to as Munger Deoghar is a national highway in India. It is a spur road of National Highway 33. NH-333 traverses the states of Bihar and Jharkhand in India.

== Route ==
=== Bihar ===
- Munger
- Bariyarpur
- Kharagpur
- Laxmipur
- Jamui
- Chakai

=== Jharkhand ===
- Deoghar.

== Junctions ==
State	Location	Destinations	Notes
Bihar	Bariyarpur	NH 33	Terminus
Bihar	Jamui	NH 333A	
Jharkhand	Deoghar	NH 114A	Terminus

== See also ==
- List of national highways in India
- List of national highways in India by state
