= Chewara =

Town and Block in Sheikhpura, Bihar, India

- Town
- Interactive map of Chewara
- Coordinates: 25°04′32″N 85°55′39″E
- Country: India State
- District: Sheikhpura
- Seat: Chewara Nagar Panchayat

Area
  - Total: 121.61 km^{2} (46.95 sq mi)

Population (2011)
  - Total: 73,267
  - Density: 602.48/km^{2} (1,560.4/sq mi)

Languages
  - Official: Magahi, Hindi
- Time zone: UTC+5:30 (IST)
- PIN: 811304
- ISO 3166 code: IN-BR
- Vehicle registration: BR-52
- Sex ratio: 961
- Lok Sabha constituency: Jamui (40)
- Vidhan Sabha constituency: Sheikhpura (169)
- Nearest railway station: Sheikhpura

Chewara is a town and municipality in Sheikhpura district of Bihar. Chewara is a block within the Sheikhpura district, which was formed from parts of Munger and Nalanda districts.

== About ==
Chewara block is located in the Sheikhpura district of Bihar in India. The block covers an area of 121.61 km², and is home to a population of 73267 people, according to the 2011 Census. The block has a high population density of 602 /km² (people per squar km).
