= National Highway 133 (India) =

National highway in India

National Highway 133
- Map of National Highway 133 in red
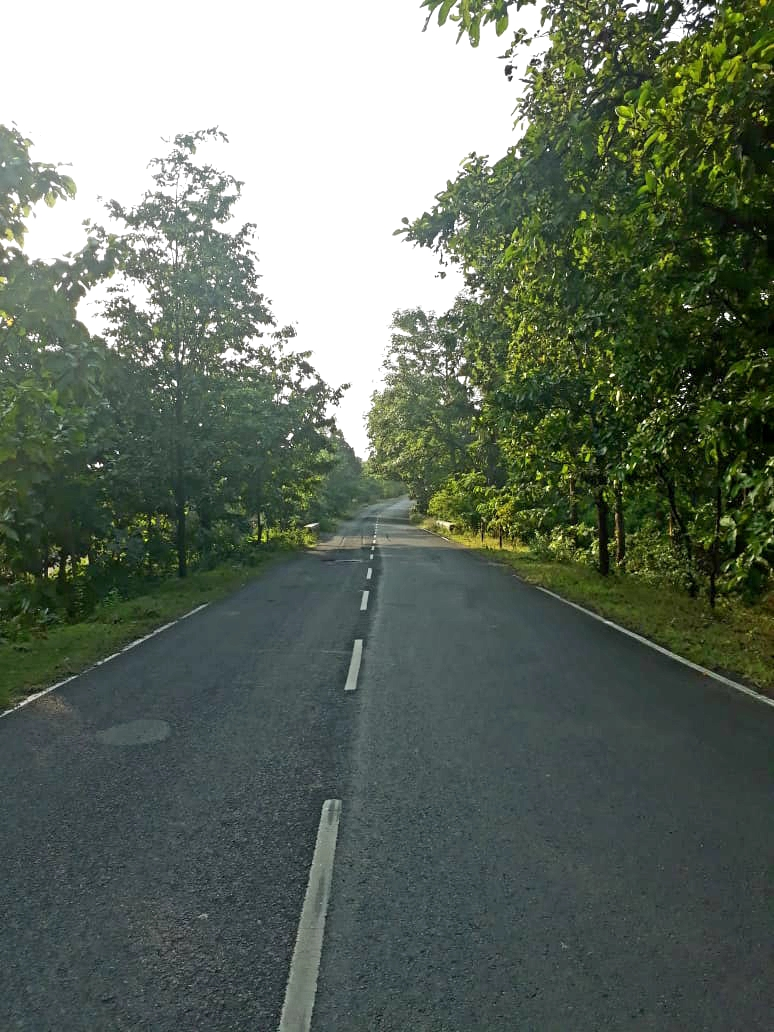
- NH133 near Godda

Route information
- Auxiliary route of NH 33
- Length: 134 km (83 mi)
- Existed: 26 September 2012 –present

Major junctions
- North end: Pirpainti
- South end: Choupa More

Location
- Country: India
- States: Bihar, Jharkhand

Highway system
- Roads in India; Expressways; National; State; Asian
| ← NH 33 | → NH 114A |

National Highway 133, commonly called NH 133 is a national highway in India. It is a spur road of National Highway 33. NH-133 traverses the states of Jharkhand and Bihar in India. The highway is 134 km (83 mi) long. The highway connects Godda in Jharkhand with Pirpainti in Bihar.

== Junctions ==
NH 33 Terminal near Pirpainti.
NH 333A near Godda.
NH 114A Terminal near Chopa More.

== Gallery ==
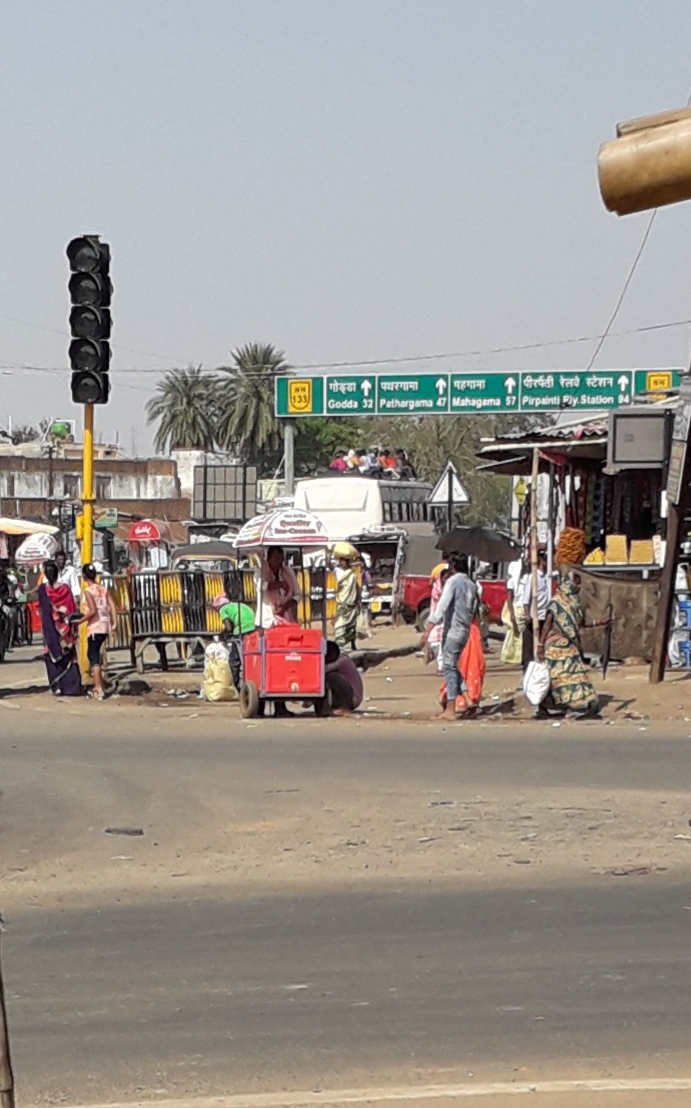
Roundabout near NH133 towards Godda, Jharkhand

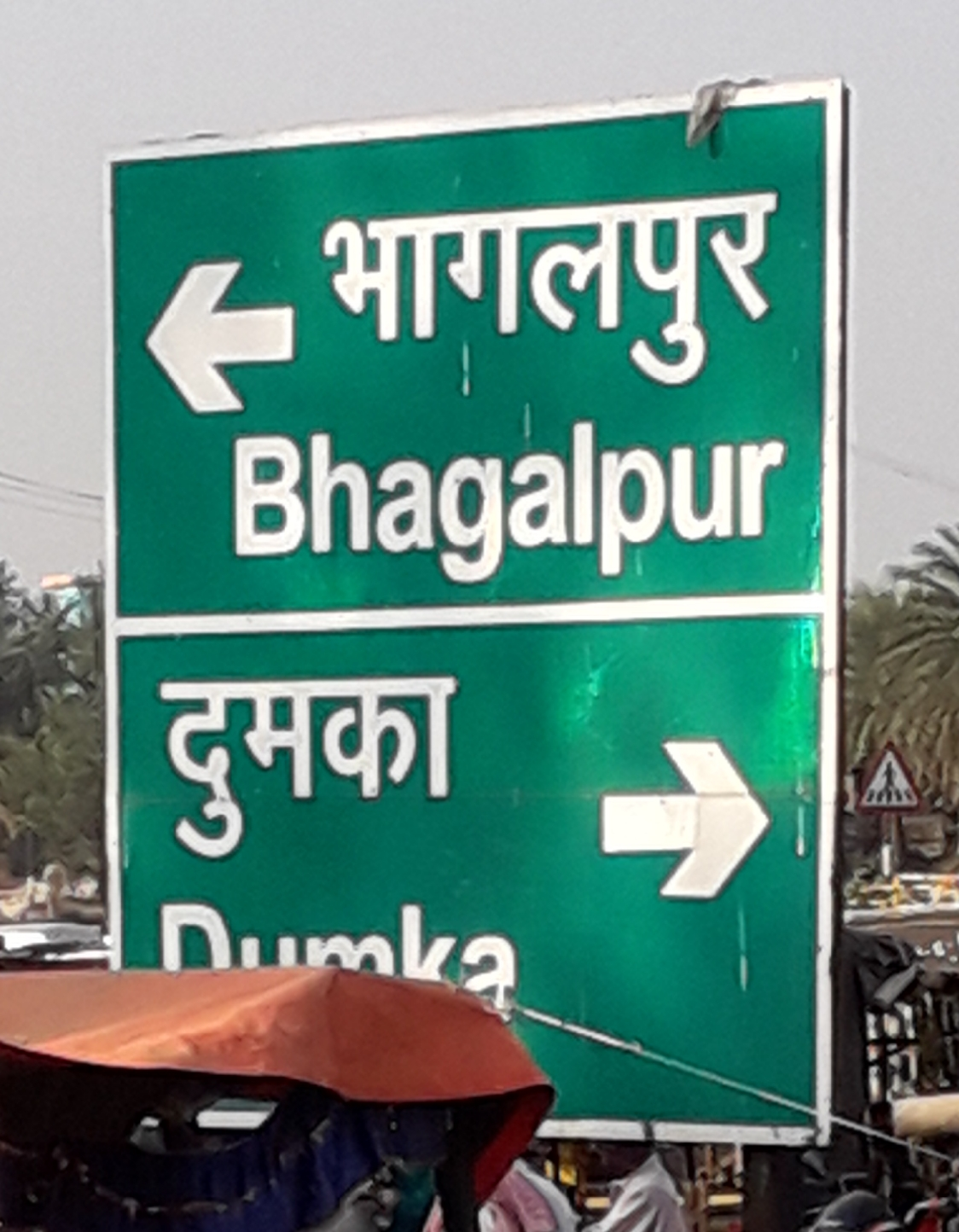
Cross roads at Hansdiha

== See also ==
- List of national highways in India
- List of national highways in India by state
