= Gopalbad =

Gopalbad is an Indian village within the Sarmera Block of Nalanda district in Bihar (India). Nearby cities are Sarmera (6 km away), Barbigha (10 km away), Sheikhpura (26 km away), Bihar Sarif (35 km away), Barh (21 km away) and Mokama (35 km away). The population of this village is approximately 3500. Agriculture is main industry of this village.

== Festivals ==
The people of Gopalbad celebrate mostly Hindu festivals including:

- Makar Sakranti
- Holi
- Chaiti Durga Puja
- Teej
- Karma
- Ganesh Chaturthi
- Dipawali
- Chhath puja
- Saraswati Puja :

Earlier Saraswati Puja is celebrated in Gopalbad at Pustkalaya, which is situated near Devisthan and almost every person from Gopalbad participates in the puja. Also natak(play) performed during Sarswati Puja adjacent to Pustakalaya plot and the notable participant was Diwakar Prasad, Late Raghunandand Prasad. But now Sarswati Puja celebrated many places at Gopalbad.
