= Neora–Daniyawan–Bihar Sharif–Sheikhpura line =

Railway line in India

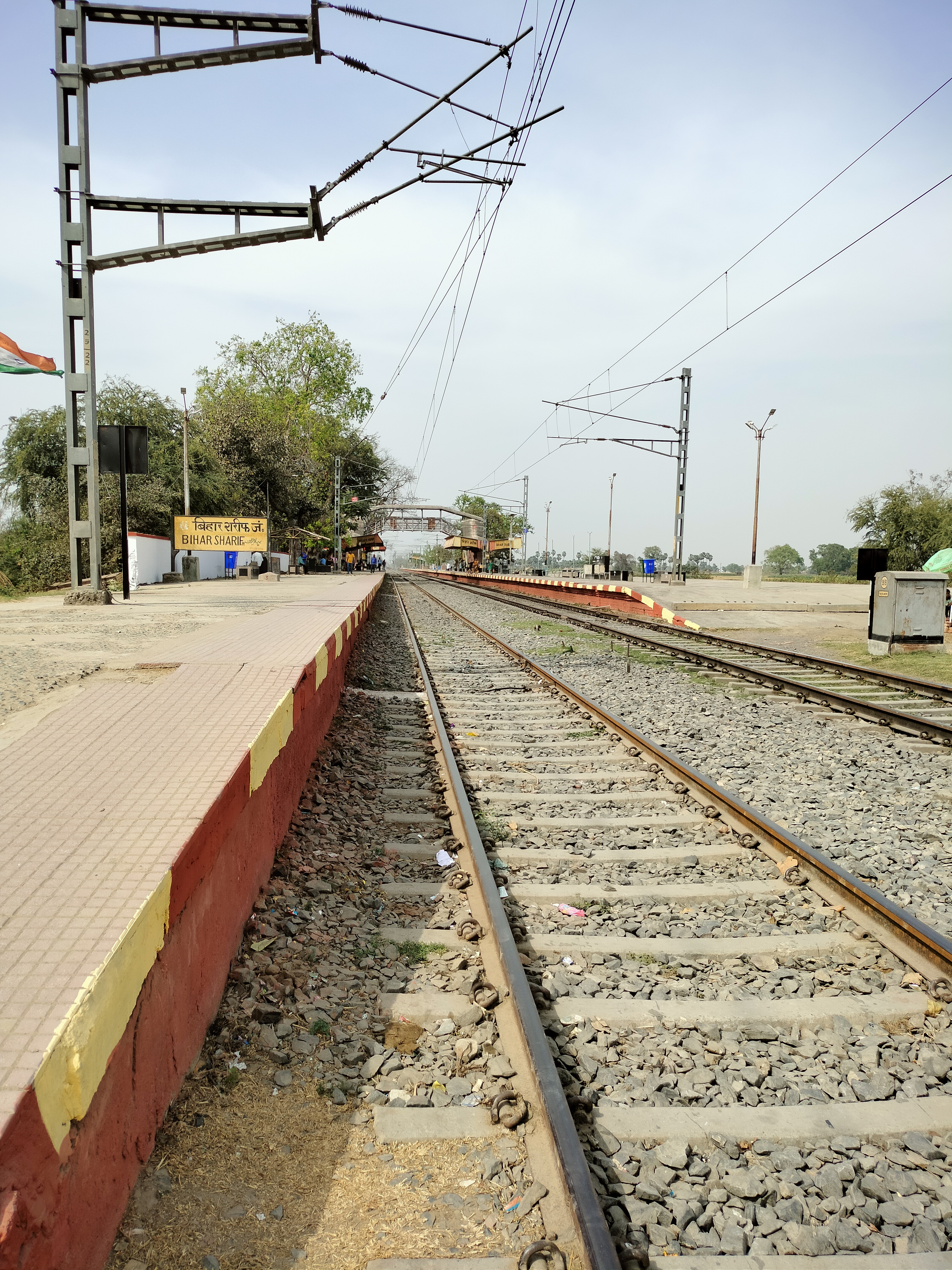
- Bihar Sharif Junction, the most important station of the rail line

Overview
- Status: Partially operational
- Owner: Indian Railways
- Locale: Patna, Nalanda & Sheikhpura districts of Bihar
- Termini: Neora; Sheikhpura

Service
- Operator: East Central Railway

History
- Opened: 2015 (Daniyawan–Bihar Sharif section); 2025 (Bihar Sharif–Sheikhpura section)

Technical
- Line length: 123.2 km (77 mi)
- Number of tracks: 1
- Track gauge: broad gauge 1,676 mm (5 ft 6 in)
- Electrification: 25 kV 50 Hz AC OHLE in 2019 b/w Daniyawan and Bihar Sharif
- Operating speed: Up to 120 km/h

The Neora–Daniyawan–Bihar Sharif–Sheikhpura line is a railway line connecting Neora on the Howrah–Delhi main line and Sheikhpura on the Gaya–Kiul line both in the Indian state of Bihar.This line connects Neora on the Howrah–Delhi main line near Danapur, Jatdumri on Patna–Gaya line, Daniyawan on Fatuha–Tilaiya line, Bihar Sharif on Bakhtiyarpur–Tilaiya line and Sheikhpura on Gaya–Kiul line.

== History ==
Neora–Daniyawan–Bihar Sharif–Sheikhpura line was approved in 2002–03 by Indian Railways in order to reduce loads of trains on Danapur–Kiul route of Howrah–Delhi main line. This was considered a very ambitious project in order to improve train operations on Patna–Jhajha–Howrah railway section. The railways have made progress on this project, particularly between the Daniyawan and Barbigha route. The train is running on Bihar Sharif–Daniyawan rail line from 2015. Bihar Sharif–Barbigha and Barbigha–Sheikhpura railway lines are being built. However, they have not made much progress on the route between Neora and Daniyawan due to land acquisition problem.

== Electrification ==
The Daniyawan–Bihar Sharif section was electrified in 2019 and inaugurated on 17 Feb 2019 by PM Narendra Modi.

== Important stations ==
Bihar Sharif Junction, Daniyawan, Barbigha and Sheikhpura are important stations on this line.

Bihar Sharif is the headquarters of Nalanda district and interchange station for Rajgir and Nalanda, which are popular tourist destinations and are part of the Buddhist Circuit of Bihar. Pawapuri is part of the Jain Circuit of Bihar.

== Sections ==
- Neora–Jatdumri section 20 km (12 mi)
- Jatdumri–Daniyawan section

22.74 km (14 mi)

- Daniyawan–Bihar Sharif section 38.28 km (24 mi)
- Bihar Sharif–Barbigha section 25.9 km (16 mi)
- Barbigha–Sheikhpura section 16.8 km (10 mi)

== Trains ==
63329/63330 Rajgir–Fatuha MEMU, runs via Bihar Sharif and Daniyawan

63389/63390 Patna-Nawada Fast MEMU, runs via Daniyawan, Bihar Sharif and Sheikhpura

== See also ==
- Bakhtiyarpur–Tilaiya line
- Fatuha–Tilaiya line
- Gaya–Kiul line
