= Ariari =

Block in Sheikhpura, Bihar, India

Ariari Ariari Pharpar
- Block
- Interactive map of Ariari
- Coordinates: 25°03′07″N 85°49′40″E
- Country: India
- State: Bihar
- District: Sheikhpura

Area
  - Total: 146.16 km^{2} (56.43 sq mi)

Population (2011)
  - Total: 112,070
  - Density: 766.76/km^{2} (1,985.9/sq mi)

Languages
  - Official: Hindi, Magahi, English
- Time zone: UTC+5:30 (IST)
- PIN: 811105
- Telephone code: 06341
- Vehicle registration: BR 52
- Sex ratio: 946
- Website: sheikhpura.bih.nic.in

Ariari is a village and one of the six blocks of Sheikhpura district of Bihar, India. Ariari block is located in Pharpar village of Sheikhpura district, Bihar, India. It is located 7 KM towards South from district head quarters Sheikhpura.

== About ==
There are different Hindu castes in the population of this block, most of the population of Ariari block - Chauhan, Yadav, Mahto, Muslim and Paswan castes are included.

Ariari- Pharpar Pin code is 811105.

(Pharpar- 0 KM ), (Tarapar- 6.5 KM), (Husainabad- 5 KM), (Teza Bigha- 6 KM), (Lohan -10 KM ), (Chorbar- 14 KM ), (Mahuli- 7 KM), (Kasar- 10 KM ), (Sasbahana Ghuskuri- 13 KM ), (Ikrean- 5.5KM) are the nearby Villages to Ariari Block.

Ariari is surrounded by Chewara Block towards East, Sheikhpura Block towards North, Aliganj Block towards South, Kashichak Block towards west .

Sheikhpura, Dhamaul, Warisaliganj, Barbigha, Jamui, Lakhisarai are the nearby Cities to Ariari.

This Place is in the border of the Sheikhpura district and Nawada district. Nawada district Pakri Barawan is west towards this place . Also it is in the Border of other district Lakhisarai .

== Geography ==
Ariari block is located in Pharpar village of Shekhpura district. Every government office of Ariyari block is situated in Pharpar village itself. The population of Ariyari block is approximately 1,20000, as per 2011. The people here speak Magahi language.

== Ideal place ==
- Maa Vatsala Bhavani Mandir Pharpar
- Sheikhpura Hills
- Girihinda Hills

== Education ==
- M.S Pharpar
- Adarsh High School+2 Pharpar Diha
- Sasbahana Ghuskuri High School

== See also ==
- List of villages in Sheikhpura district
