= Arwal =

Town in Bihar, India

- Town
- Location in Bihar, India Arwal (India) Arwal (Asia)
- Coordinates: 25°14′39″N 84°39′47″E
- Country: India
- State: Bihar
- District: Arwal

Population (2011)
  - Total: 51,849

Language
  - Official: Hindi
  - Additional official: Urdu
  - Regional: Magahi
- Time zone: UTC+5:30 (IST)
- PIN: 804401
- ISO 3166 code: IN-BR
- Vehicle registration: BR-56
- Website: arwal.bih.nic.in

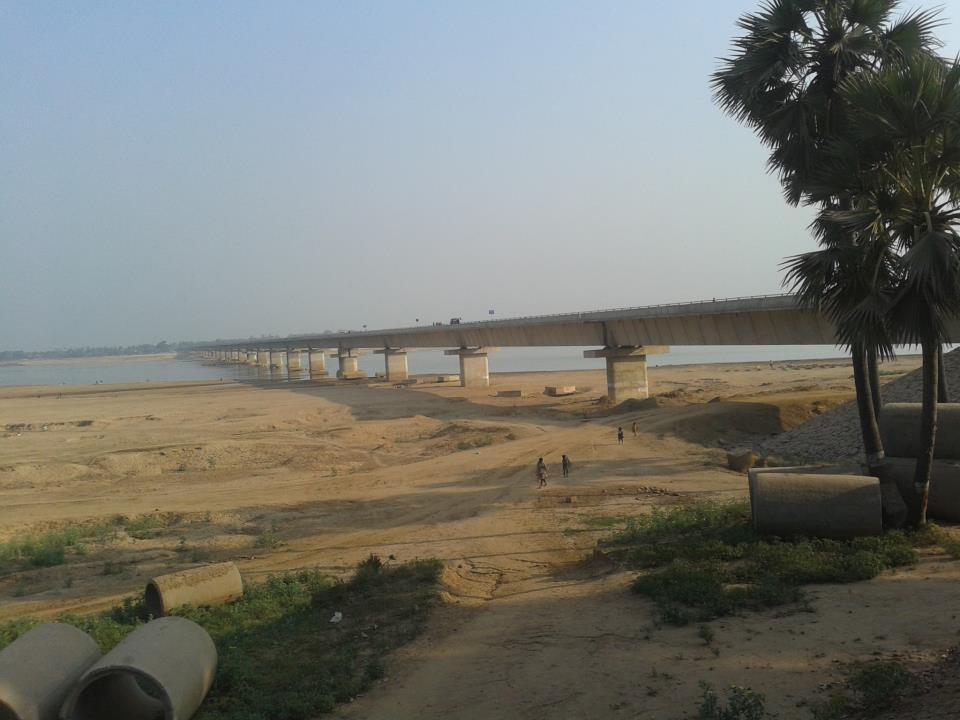
Son River Arwal Bihar

Arwal town is the administrative headquarters of Arwal district in Bihar state of India. It was earlier part of Jehanabad district. The district as formed to control the naxalism in the area. District was formed from the area of two near by districts i.e. Jehanabad and Aurangabad. Arwal has a population of 588,000. Arwal, the district headquarters is approximately 80 km south from the state capital Patna. Arwal town is situated on the right side bank of the Sone River, which is a tributary to the Ganges.

== Geography ==
Arwal is located at 25.25°N 84.68°E. It has an average elevation of 67 metres (220 ft). The district headquarters is in Arwal, near river (Sone). The state capital, Patna is 65 km to the north.

== Language ==
The official languages are Hindi and Urdu. The regional language spoken here is Magahi.

== Economy ==
The economy of the district is completely agricultural and does not have any industry. Paddy, wheat and maize are the main crops. In March 2008 the Bihar government approved the construction of a bridge across the Son River at a cost of Rs. 9,742 lakhs (Rs. 974,200,000) from Arwal to Sahar in Bhojpur district. The economy of Arwal depends on agriculture only. Most of the population resides in villages and are farmers. The entire district is well irrigated due to the proper arrangement of canals, except area like Kurtha, Vanshi and Karpi. There is no existence of any industry or other business centre.

== Population ==
Arwal District Population.

	Population	Literate Population
Male	363497	243163
Female	337346	157276
Total	700843	400439

== Transport ==
Arwal is connected by road through National Highway 139 (NH 139), which links the town with Patna to the north and Aurangabad to the south. National Highway 33 (NH 33) originates at Arwal and provides connectivity to Bihar Sharif, Munger, Bhagalpur, and Farakka.

Arwal does not have a railway station of its own. The nearest major railhead is Jehanabad, approximately 35 km away, while Anugraha Narayan Road railway station is about 60 km away. The nearest airport is Jay Prakash Narayan International Airport in Patna, around 65 km from Arwal.

== Notable people ==
- Tariq Anwar, Cabinet Minister Govt of India
- Akhilesh Prasad Singh, Ex-Minister Govt of India
- Rambali Singh Chandravanshi, Ex-Minister of Bihar Legislative Council
- Manoj Kumar Sharma, Member of Bihar Legislative Assembly
