= Barharwa =

Barharwa Barharwa
- Town
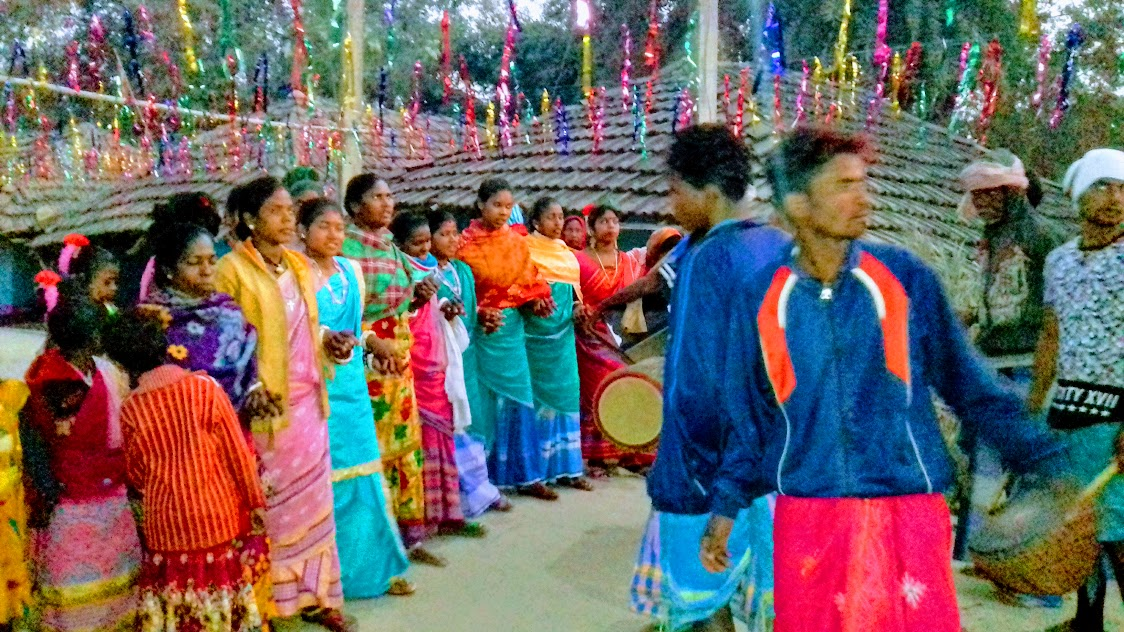
- Bandana festival in the outskirts of Barharwa

- Location in Jharkhand, India Barharwa (India)
- Coordinates: 24.857778°N 87.777167°E
- Country: India
- State: Jharkhand
- District: Sahibganj

Government
  - Type: Nagar Panchayat
  - Body: Barharwa Nagar Panchayat
  - Chairman: Shyamal Das
  - Deputy Chairman: Lokesh Kushwaha

Area
  - Total: 4.06 km^{2} (1.57 sq mi)

Population (2011)
  - Total: 12,617
  - Density: 3,110/km^{2} (8,050/sq mi)

Languages (*For language details see Barharwa (community development block)#Language and religion)
  - Official: Hindi, Urdu
- Time zone: UTC5:30 (IST)
- Postal code: 816101
- Vehicle registration: JH 18
- Lok Sabha constituency: Rajmahal
- Vidhan Sabha constituency: Pakaur
- Website: sahibganj.nic.in

Barharwa is a town with a Nagar panchayat in the Rajmahal subdivision of the Sahibganj district in the Indian state of Jharkhand.

== Geography ==
Cities, towns and locations in the Sahibganj, Godda and Pakur districts in Santhal Pargana Division
M: municipality, CT: census town, R: rural/ urban centre, H: historical/ religious/ tourist centre
Owing to space constraints in the small map, the actual locations in a larger map may vary slightly

=== Location ===
Barharwa is a nagar panchayat.

Barharwa is located at 24.857778°N 87.777167°E.

Barharwa has an area of 4.06 square kilometres (1.57 sq mi).

=== Overview ===
The map shows a hilly area with the Rajmahal hills running from the bank of the Ganges in the extreme north to the south, beyond the area covered by the map into Dumka district. ‘Farakka’ is marked on the map and that is where Farakka Barrage is, just inside West Bengal. Rajmahal coalfield is shown in the map. The entire area is overwhelmingly rural with only small pockets of urbanisation.

Note: All places marked on the map are linked and you can move on to another page of your choice. Enlarge the map to see what else is there – one gets railway links, many more road links and so on.

== Demographics ==
According to the 2011 Census of India, Barharwa had a total population of 12,617, of which 6,550 (52%) were males and 6,067 (48%) were females. Population in the age range 0–6 years was 1,694. The total number of literate persons in Barharwa was 8,570 (78.46% of the population over 6 years).

A newspaper report says that 9 villages have been added for the formation of Barharwa nagar panchayat in 2016 and the population rose to 24,133. This rise would obviously get reflected in the 2021 census.

== Infrastructure ==
According to the District Census Handbook 2011, Sahibganj, Barharwa covered an area of 4.06 km^{2}. Among the civic amenities, it had 14 km roads with both open and closed drains, the protected water supply involved hand pump, uncovered well. It had 1,189 domestic electric connections, 105 road light points. Among the educational facilities it had 4 primary schools, 5 middle schools, 2 secondary schools, 2 senior secondary schools, 1 general degree college. Among the social, cultural and recreational facilities, it had 2 stadiums, 2 cinema theatres, 1 auditorium/ community hall, 1 public library,1 reading room. Three important commodities it produced were bidi, papad, aachar. It had the branch offices of 2 nationalised banks.

== Civic administration ==
=== Police station ===
Barharwa police station serves Barharwa CD block.

=== CD block HQ ===
Headquarters of Barharwa CD block is at Barharwa town.

== Transport ==
Barharwa Junction railway station is on the Sahibganj loop. The Barharwa–Azimganj–Katwa loop originates from Barharwa.

== Education ==
B.S.K. College, affiliated with Sido Kanhu Murmu University, was established at Barharwa.

This area also have some small public libraries like Deeni Library (Library of Wisdom) at Bindudham Road etc.
