= Barbigha =

Town in Sheikhpura, Bihar, India

- Town
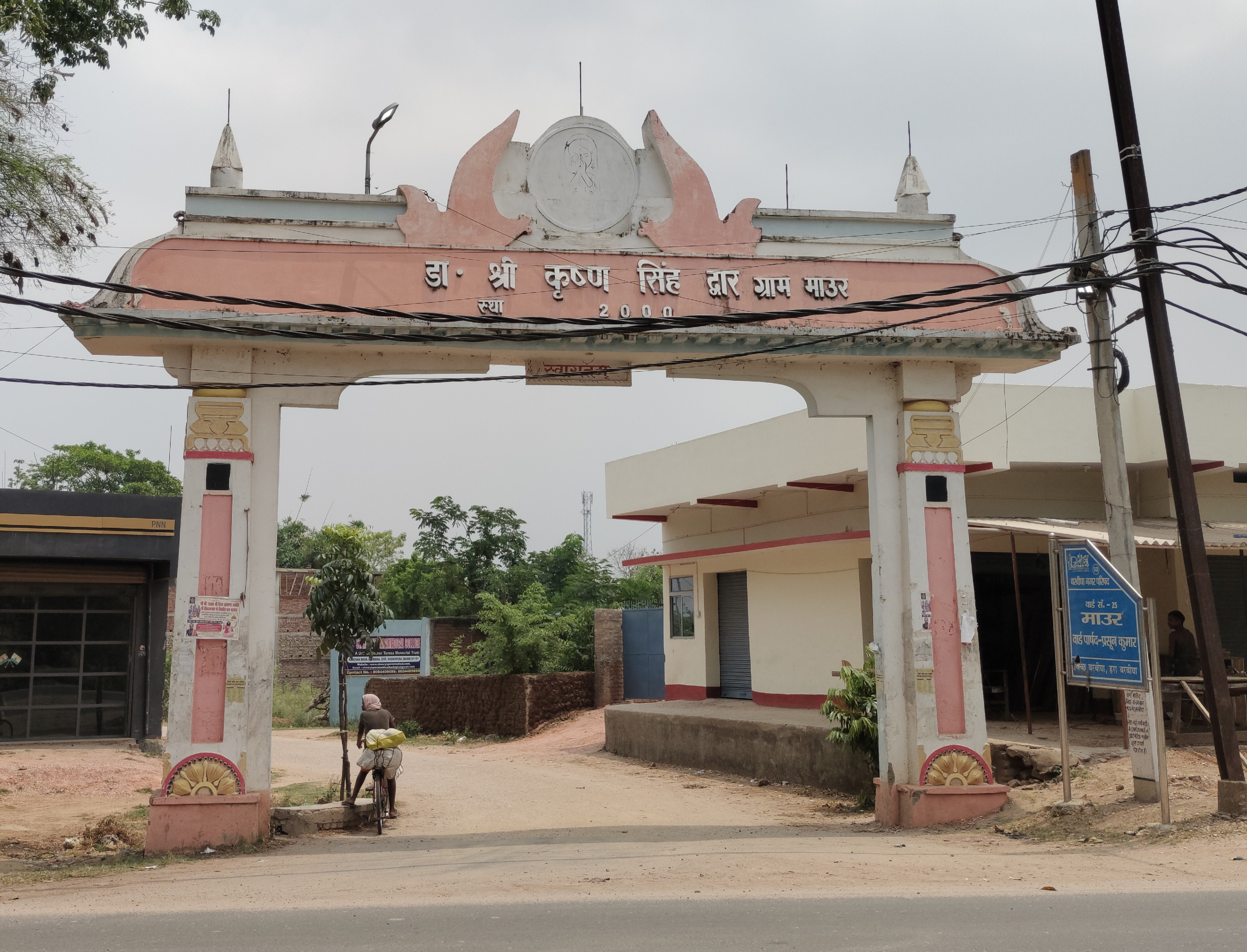
- Entry gate of Maur Village of Barbigha.

- Location in Bihar, India
- Coordinates: 25°13′15″N 85°43′54″E
- Country: India
- State: Bihar
- District: Sheikhpura
- Named after: Twelve Bighas
- Seat: Barbigha Municipal Council
- Elevation: 51 m (167 ft)

Population (2011)
  - Total: 46,075
- Demonym: Barbighiya

Languages
  - Official: Magahi, Hindi
- Time zone: UTC+5:30 (IST)
- PIN: 811101
- Telephone code: 06341
- ISO 3166 code: IN-BR
- Vehicle registration: BR-52
- Sex ratio: 1000/900 ♂/♀
- Literacy: 73.63%
- Lok Sabha constituency: Nawada
- Vidhan Sabha constituency: Barbigha
- Nearest railway station: Barbigha

Barbigha is a town and a municipality in the Sheikhpura district of Bihar, India. It is also one of the 6 blocks under Sheikhpura district. It is well connected by road to the state capital of Patna. The national highways NH33 and NH333A also pass through Barbigha, and Bihta-Sarmera four lane state highway passes from Gopalbad near it. Vishnudham, Samas and Panchvadan Sthan, Kusedhi are some prominent temples of Barbigha.

== Etymology ==
The name "Barbigha" is believed to be derived from two Hindi words, Barah and Bigha, meaning twelve bighas (approximately 3 hectares). This suggests that the town originally encompassed this area at the time of its founding.

== History ==
The earliest known historical mention of Barbigha dates back to 1812, when Francis Buchanan referred to it as Barabigha, a spelling variation of the name. At that time, it was noted to consist of nearly 1,000 households, similar to its divisional headquarters, Sheikhpura. Another Account of 1838 notes it to be a marketplace. Data from 1867 to 1872 reported the population of Barbigha as 6,362. The Census of India in 1881, conducted by Emil Jung, recorded the population as 7,904.

There are mentions of a post office as early as 1894 and a police station as early as 1901 in historical records related to Barbigha. In the same year, the Sheikhpura and Barbigha police stations were transferred from the Jamui subdivision to the Monghyr subdivision. The same Barbigha police station reported the discovery of a hoard of 96 treasure trove coins of the Sultans of Delhi during the period of 1919-1920. A report from 1903 mentions the ongoing construction of the district road to Sheikhpura to serve as feeder of South Bihar Railway.

== Demographics ==
According to the 2011 Census, Barbigha had a population of 136,167, more than double that of its district headquarters, Sheikhpura. The town comprises 21,797 households, with 65.94% of the population living in rural areas. The population includes 70,611 males and 65,556 females, with 22.3% classified as Scheduled Castes or Scheduled Tribes. The sex ratio is 928 females for every 1,000 males, slightly above the state average of 918, while the child sex ratio is 945, compared to the Bihar state average of 935.

Barbigha has grown to become the biggest town market of the Sheikhpura district, serving as a commercial market for the surrounding villages. Sri Krishan Singh (First Chief Minister of Bihar) was from Barbigha and Rastrakavi Ramdhari Singh Dinkar served as headmaster of a high school in Barbigha.

== Education ==
=== Higher Education Institutions ===
- S.K.R College : A constituent unit of Munger University, previously affiliated with Bhagalpur University.
- R. Lal College : Affiliated with Patliputra University.

==== Other Degree Colleges ====
- Sundar Singh College, Mehus
- Neemi College
- Sai College
- C.N.B College, Hathiyama

==== Technical Colleges ====
- Government Polytechnic College, Barbigha
- Government ITI College, Barbigha

=== Schools ===
==== CBSE Affiliated Senior Secondary Schools ====
- Gyan Niketan Residential School
- Divine Light Public School
- St. Mary's English School
- Vikas International Public School

==== Unaffiliated CBSE Schools ====
- SPS Public School
- G.I.P Public School
- Adarsh Vidya Bharti
- Barbigha Central School
- Mount Litera Zee School
- Golden Era English School

==== Bihar Government Affiliated Schools ====
- Raj Rajeshwar +2 School
- Ram Prasad Bhagwati Charan adarsh High School
- Barbigha Town High School
- Tailik Balika Inter School
- High School Kutaut
- Kasturba Gandhi Balika Vidyalaya, Kutaut
- +2 School, Mehus
- Sri Satya Sai Vidya Mandir, Bhadarthi
