= National Highway 33 (India) =

National highway in India

National Highway 33
- Map of National Highway 33 in red

Route information
- Length: 462.25 km (287.23 mi)

Major junctions
- West end: NH 139 in Arwal, Bihar
- List: NH 22 in Jehanabad, Bihar; NH 20 in Bihar Sharif, Bihar; NH 333A in Barbigha, Bihar; NH 31 in Mokama, Bihar; NH 333B in Munger, Bihar; NH 333 in Bariarpur, Bihar; NH 133 in Pirpainti, Bihar; NH 131B / NH 133E in Bhagalpur, Bihar; NH 133A in Barharwa, Jharkhand
- East end: NH 12 in Farakka, West Bengal

Location
- Country: India
- States: Bihar, Jharkhand, West Bengal
- Primary destinations: Jehanabad, Bandhuganj, Ekangarsarai, Biharsharif, Mokama, Lakhisarai, Jamalpur, Munger, Bhagalpur, Kahalgaon, Sahibganj, Rajmahal, Barharwa, Tildanga, Ghoshpukur.

Highway system
- Roads in India; Expressways; National; State; Asian
← NH 139	→ NH 12

National Highway 33 (NH 33) (previously known as NH 80) is a National Highway in India. It runs from Arwal to Farakka. The highway links Bihar to West Bengal via Jharkhand. This highway connects some major cities of Bihar such as Munger and Bhagalpur to the capital city Patna. This highway is known as the worst highway of India as the stretch between Sahibganj to Farakka is the most dangerous & full of Poth holes. This highway is also the narrowest highway of India as stretches from Arwal to Jehanabad, Biharsharif to Mokama & Rajmahal to Farakka are the hotspot for most Highway related accidents.

== Route ==
=== Bihar ===
- Arwal
- Jehanabad
- Biharsharif
- Barbigha
- Mokama
- Lakhisarai
- Munger
- Bariarpur
- Sultanganj
- Bhagalpur
- Kahalgaon
- Pirpainti

=== Jharkhand ===
- Sahibganj
- Rajmahal
- Barharwa
- Bewa Bridge
- Ranchi
- Hazaribag
- Barhi Road Junction

=== West Bengal ===
- Tildanga
- Ghoshpukur
- NTPC Farakka
- Farakka

== Development Works ==
Currently this Highway is 4 lane in between Jehanabad to Biharsharif. 4 Lane making is going on between Arwal to Jehanabad, Mokama to Bhagalpur, Bhagalpur to Sahibganj & Sahibganj to Rajmahal.
