= Sheikhpura =

- Town
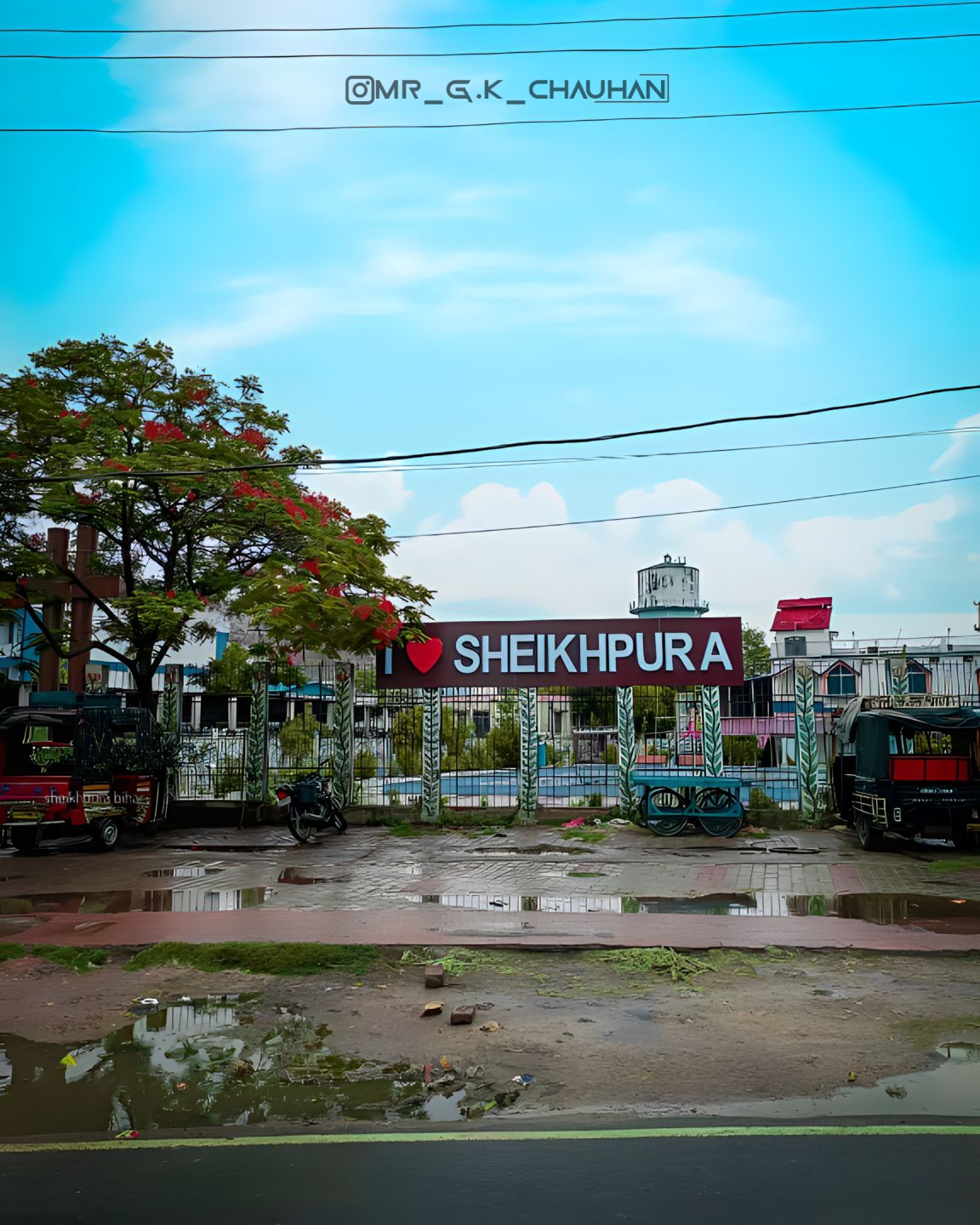
- Sheikhpura, Bihar, India

- Location in Bihar, India
- Coordinates: 25°08′25″N 85°51′03″E
- Country: India
- State: Bihar
- District: Sheikhpura
- Municipal Council: Sheikhpura Municipal Council

Area
  - Total: 13.4 km^{2} (5.2 sq mi)
- Elevation: 54 m (177 ft)

Population (2011)
  - Total: 62,927
  - Density: 4,700/km^{2} (12,200/sq mi)

Languages
  - Official: Hindi, Urdu
  - Native: Magahi
- Time zone: UTC+5:30 (IST)
- PIN: 811105
- Telephone code: 06341
- Vehicle registration: BR-52
- Sex ratio: 1000/899 ♂/♀
- Literacy: 69.04%
- Website: Sheikhpura district website

Sheikhpura is a town and a municipality in Sheikhpura district in the Indian state of Bihar. Sheikhpura is also an administrative headquarter of Sheikhpura district.

== Postal code ==
PIN code of Sheikhpura post office is 811105. Postal code for Mehus is 811102.

== Notable people ==
- Sri Krishna Singh
- Makhdoom Shah Muhammad Munim Pak
- Syed Hasan
- Sudarshan Kumar
- Krishna Ballabh Sahay
- Rajo Singh
- Sunila Devi
- Kumkum, Bollywood actress from Hussainabad nawab family who acted in first Bhojpuri movie as lead Ganga Maiya Tohe Piyari Chadaibey. She had played important roles in famous Hindi movies like Lalkar, Ankhen and Mother India.
- Aftab Alam
- Abul Mahasin Muhammad Sajjad
- Syed Muzaffaruddin Nadwi, born in Maninda near Sheikhpura

== See also ==
- Sheikhpura Railway Station
- Ariari
- Ashok Dham Temple
