= Sheikhpura Junction railway station =

Railway station in Sheikhpura, Bihar, India

SHEIKHPURA JUNCTION
- Indian Railways logo

General information
- Location: Sheikhpura 811105, Bihar; India
- Coordinates: 25°07′51″N 85°51′09″E
- Elevation: 43.75 metres (143.5 ft)
- System: Indian Railways station
- Owner: Indian Railways
- Operator: East Central Railway zone
- Lines: Gaya–Kiul line Neora–Daniyawan–Bihar Sharif–Sheikhpura line (UC)
- Platforms: 3
- Tracks: 2

Construction
- Structure type: Standard (on-ground station)
- Parking: Available

Other information
- Status: Functioning
- Station code: SHK
- Zone(s): East Central Railway
- Division(s): Danapur

History
- Opened: 1879
- Electrified: 2018

Passengers
- 1494 (Daily)

Services
East Central Railway
Preceding station	Indian Railways	Following station
Kusumha Bihar Halt towards Gaya Junction	Gaya–Kiul line	Eksari Halt towards Kiul
Matokhar towards Neora	Neora–Daniyawan–Bihar Sharif–Sheikhpura line	Terminus
Location

Sheikhpura Junction (station code: SHK), is a railway station under Danapur railway division of East Central Railway. Sheikhpura is connected to metropolitan areas of India, by the Gaya–Kiul line. Station is located in Sheikhpura city in Sheikhpura district in the Indian state of Bihar. Due to its location on the Gaya–Kiul line, many trains coming from Gaya and other cities stops here. Sheikhpura is well connected with nearby cities Gaya, Nawada, Bhagalpur, Howrah and Kiul through daily passenger and express train services.

A new branch line between Neora railway station and Sheikhpura railway station via Neora, Jatdumri, Daniyawan, Bihar Sharif, Sheikhpura is under construction in which Bihar Sharif–Daniyawan section was partially started in 2015.

== History ==
Several years before the Grand Chord was built, a connection from the Howrah–Delhi main line to Gaya was developed in 1900 and the South Bihar Railway Company (operated by EIR) had laid a line from Lakhisarai to Gaya in 1879. The Grand Chord was opened on 6 December 1906.

== Structure ==
There are only three platforms in the Sheikhpura Junction railway station. The platforms are interconnected with a single foot overbridge.

== Electrification and doubling of track ==
Feasibility studies for the electrification of the Manpur–Tilaiya–Kiul section were announced in the rail budget for 2010–11 and the electrification work of single track is going on starting 2015–16. Electrification of single line from Gaya to Kiul have been completed in July 2018. It has been completed in two phases. In first phase Tilaiya to Warisaliganj have been completed and in the other phase Warisaliganj to Lakhisarai. A special MEMU train was flagged on 22 October 2018 by State Railway Minister Mr Manoj Sinha. The track doubling project was completed and commissioned by February 2025.

== Nearest railway stations ==
Sheikpura: Nearest Railway Stations
Station	Station Code	Station Grade	District	State	Distance (in km.)
Pt Deen Dayal Upadhyaya Junction	DDU	A+	Chandauli	Uttar Pradesh	276
Varanasi Junction	BSB	A+	Varanasi	Uttar Pradesh	289
Kiul Junction	KIUL	A	Lakhisarai	Bihar	26
Mokameh Junction	MKA	A	Patna	Bihar	30
Barauni Junction	BJU	A	Begusarai	Bihar	39
Jhajha	JAJ	A	Jamui	Bihar	67
Samastipur Junction	SPJ	A	Samastipur	Bihar	81
Barh	BARH	B	Patna	Bihar	39
Begusarai	BGS	B	Begusarai	Bihar	43
Bakhtiyarpur Junction	BKP	B	Nalanda	Bihar	49
Jamalpur Junction	JMP	B	Munger	Bihar	67
Fatuha	FUT	B	Patna	Bihar	69
Barhiya	BRYA	C	Lakhisarai	Bihar	23
Luckeesarai Junction	LKR	C	Lakhisarai	Bihar	25
Hathidah Junction	HTZ	C	Patna	Bihar	29
Kajra	KJH	C	Lakhisarai	Bihar	41
Jamui	JMU	C	Jamui	Bihar	44
Dumri Halt	DMRX	D	Lakhisarai	Bihar	22
Mankatha	MKB	D	Lakhisarai	Bihar	22
Waris Aleganj	WRS	D	Nawada	Bihar	25
Rampur Dumra	RDUM	D	Patna	Bihar	27
Hathidah Upper	HTZU	D	Patna	Bihar	28
Sirari	SRY	E	Sheikhpura	Bihar	10
Kashi Chak	KSC	E	Nawada	Bihar	15
Rampur Halt	RMPR	E	Lakhisarai	Bihar	29
Aunta Halt	ANAH	E	Patna	Bihar	29
Tall Junction	TALL	E	Patna	Bihar	29

== Nearest airports ==
The nearest airports to Sheikhpura junction are:

1. Lok Nayak Jayaprakash Airport, Patna 123.36 kilometres (76.65 mi)
2. Gaya Airport 116.6 kilometres (72.5 mi)

== See also ==
- Sheikhpura city
- Sheikhpura district
