= Neora Junction railway station =

Railway station in Patna, Bihar, India

Neora Junction
- Indian Railways logo

General information
- Location: Neora, Patna, Bihar; India
- Coordinates: 25°34′29.796″N 84°59′12.561″E
- Elevation: 61 metres (200 ft)
- System: Indian Railways
- Owner: Indian Railways
- Operator: East Central Railway
- Line: Patna–Mughalsarai section
- Platforms: 2

Construction
- Structure type: Standard (on-ground station)
- Parking: Available

Other information
- Status: Functioning
- Station code: NEO
- Zone(s): East Central Railway
- Division(s): Danapur

Services
Preceding station	Indian Railways	Following station
East Central Railway
Gandhi Halt towards ?	Patna–Mughalsarai section Towards Patna JN.	Danapur towards ?
Location
- Location within Bihar Location within India
- Interactive map of Neora

Neora Junction railway station (station code: NEO), is a railway station in the Danapur railway division of East Central Railway. Neora is connected to metropolitan areas of India, by the Delhi–Kolkata main line via Mugalsarai–Patna route. Neora is located in Danapur city in Patna district in the Indian state of Bihar. Due to its location on the Howrah–Patna–Mughalsarai main line many Patna, Barauni–bound express trains coming from Howrah, Sealdah stop here.

== Facilities ==
The major facilities available are waiting rooms, a computerized reservation facility, and vehicle parking.

== Nearest airports ==
The nearest airports to Neora station are

1. Lok Nayak Jayaprakash Airport, Patna 10.5 kilometres (6.5 mi)
2. Gaya Airport 104 kilometres (65 mi)
