= Sheikhpura district =

District in Bihar, India

- District
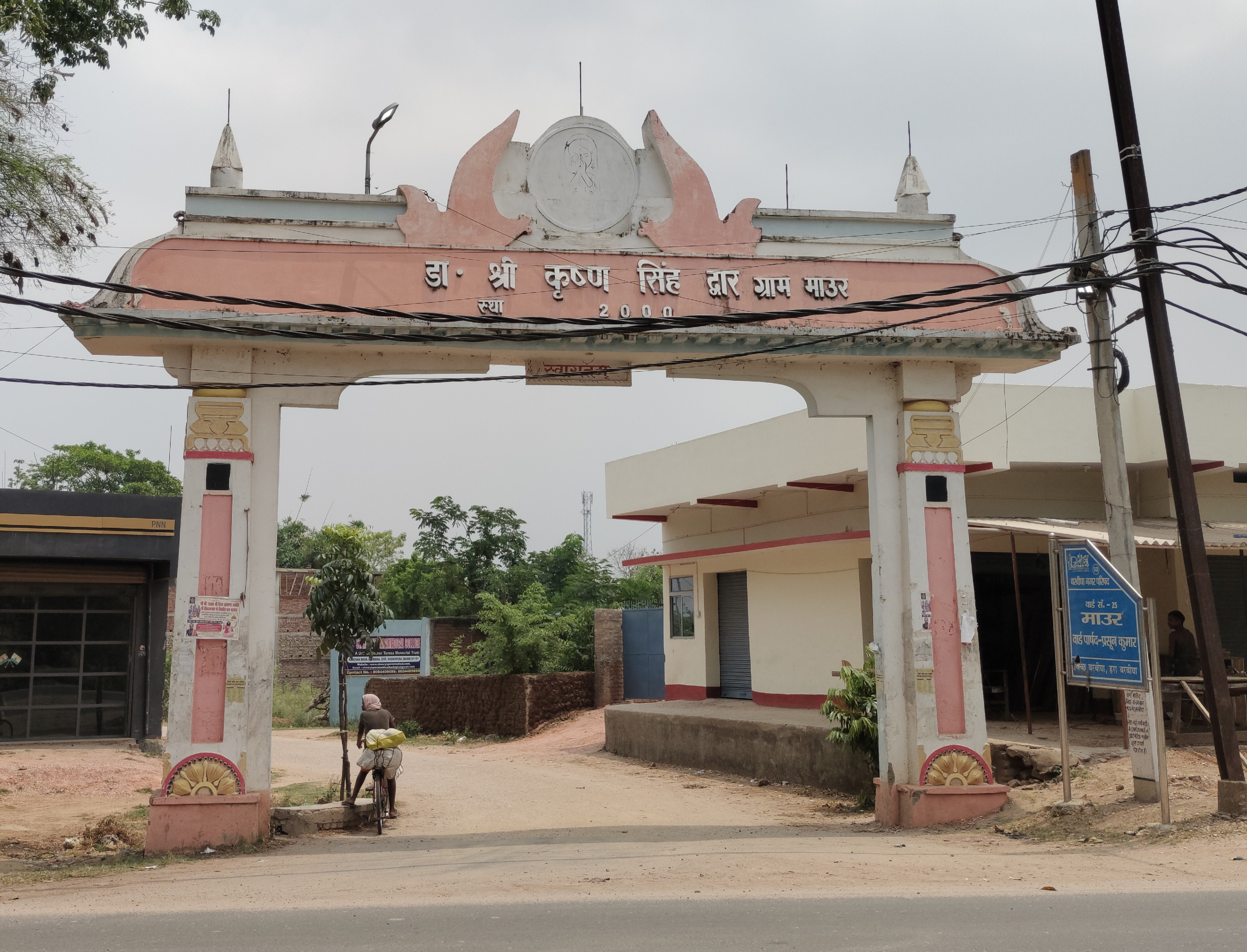
- Entry Gate of Maur village of Barbigha Block

- Location of sheikhpura district in Bihar
- Interactive map of Sheikhpura district
- Coordinates (Sheikhpura): 25°08′20″N 85°51′12″E
- Country: India
- State: Bihar
- Division: Munger
- Established: 31 July 1994
- Headquarters: Sheikhpura

Government
  - Lok Sabha constituencies: Jamui (40); Nawada (39)
  - Vidhan Sabha constituencies: Barbigha (170); Sheikhpura (169)

Area
  - Total: 689 km^{2} (266 sq mi)

Population (2011)
  - Total: 636,342
  - Rank: 38
  - Density: 924/km^{2} (2,390/sq mi)
  - Urban: 109,002
  - Rural: 527,340

Demographics
  - Literacy: 65.96 per cent
  - Sex ratio: 926
- Time zone: UTC+05:30 (IST)
- PIN Code: 8111xx
- Major highways: NH 33
- Website: sheikhpura.nic.in

Sheikhpura district is one of the thirty-eight districts in Bihar, India and a part of the Munger division with Sheikhpura as its administrative headquarters. Established on 31 July 1994 from the Munger district due to political efforts by Rajo Singh, it was the least populous district in Bihar as of the 2011 census. Shri Krishna Sinha, the first chief minister of Bihar, was born in Maur village, which is now situated in Barbigha block of this district.

== History ==
It is believed that during the Mahabharata era, a demoness named Hiḍimbā lived in the hillocks of Sheikhpura's eastern stretch. She married Bhima, one of the Pandava brothers, and they had a heroic son named Ghatotkacha. The hill was later named Girihinda after Hidimba where Giri means a hill in Sanskrit, and the village of Girihinda still exists today.

Sheikhpura also served as a significant administrative center during the Pallava reign. It is also believed that the Afghan ruler Sher Shah Suri had the notable Dal Kuan (well) constructed there.

During the Mughal period, Sheikhpura was designated as a Thana. Under British rule, it became a Big Kotwali, and after independence, it was recognized as a Block. On 14 April 1983, Sheikhpura was established as a Subdivision. It was split from the Munger district into a separate district with headquarters in Sheikhpura on 31 July 1994 due to political efforts of Rajo Singh.

== Geography ==
The Sheikhpura district occupies an area of 689 square kilometres (266 sq mi), comparatively equivalent to the Solomon Islands' Kolombangara.

== Administration ==
The Sheikhpura district is headed by an IAS officer of the rank of District Magistrate (DM). The district is divided into sub-divisions or Tehsils, each headed by a Sub Divisional Magistrate (SDM).

These Tehsils are further divided into Blocks, each headed by a Block development officer (BDO).

=== Tehsils ===
The only subdivision or Tehsil in Sheikhpura district is Sheikhpura.

=== Blocks ===
The 6 Blocks under Sheikhpura Tehsil in Sheikhpura district are as follows:

Tehsil (Sub-division)	CD Blocks	Area (Km2)	Population (2011)	Density	Villages (2011)
Sheikhpura	Ariari	146.16	1,12,070	767	61
Sheikhpura	Barbigha	99.88	1,36,167	1,363	43
Sheikhpura	Chewara	121.61	73,267	602	39
Sheikhpura	Ghatkusumbha	80.28	48,346	602	23
Sheikhpura	Sheikhpura	181.24	1,99,011	1,098	69
Sheikhpura	Shekhopursarai	59.83	67,481	1,128	26
Sheikhpura	Total	689	6,36,342	924	261

== Economy ==
Sheikhpura is one of the smallest districts of Bihar. The population of Sheikhpura primarily depends on agriculture. Bonded labour may still occur. Small-scale mining operations of smaller hillocks with crushers is another of the main activities. In 2006 the Ministry of Panchayati Raj named Sheikhpura one of the country's 250 most-impoverished districts. It is one of the 36 districts in Bihar currently receiving funds from the Backward Regions Grant Fund Programme.

== Energy ==
The district administration is committed to diversification of energy supply towards green sources like solar energy.

== Education ==
As part of Bihar Government's initiative of opening at least one Government Degree College in each block of the state having zero college, four new colleges were inaugurated on 15 July 2026 by the Bihar CM Samrat Chaudhary. The four new colleges were opened in Ariari, Chewara, Ghatkusumbha and Shekhopursarai blocks of Sheikhpura district.

Colleges

- R. D. College, Sheikhpura
- S. K. R. College, Barbigha, Sheikhpura
- S. S. College, Mehus, Sheikhpura
- C. N. B. College, Hathiama, Sheikhpura
- Sanjay Gandhi Mahila College, Sheikhpura
- Rajkiye Degree Mahavidyalaya, Ariari, Sheikhpura
- Rajkiye Degree Mahavidyalaya, Ghatkusumbha, Sheikhpura
- Rajkiye Degree Mahavidyalaya, Shekhopursarai, Sheikhpura
- Rajkiye Degree Mahavidyalaya, Chewara, Sheikhpura

== Transport ==
The roadways and railways are the major modes of transport in the district. The major railways stations in the district include Barbigha, Sarsa Jamalpur, Matokhar, Sheikhpura, Sirari, etc.

== Politics ==
District	No.	Constituency	Name	Party	Alliance	Remarks
Sheikhpura	169	Sheikhpura	Randhir Kumar Soni	JD(U)	NDA	
Sheikhpura	170	Barbigha	Kumar Puspanjay	JD(U)	NDA	

== Demographics ==
Historical population
Year	Pop.	±% p.a.
1901	152,726	—
1911	157,460	+0.31%
1921	149,761	−0.50%
1931	168,687	+1.20%
1941	190,743	+1.24%
1951	210,915	+1.01%
1961	246,528	+1.57%
1971	294,826	+1.81%
1981	350,677	+1.75%
1991	420,260	+1.83%
2001	525,502	+2.26%
2011	636,342	+1.93%

Religions in Sheikhpura district (2011)
Religion	Percent
Hinduism	93.68%
Islam	5.92%
Other or not stated	0.40%

According to the 2011 Census of India, Sheikhpura district had a population of 636,342, giving it a ranking of 516th in India. The district had a population density of 922 inhabitants per square kilometre (2,390/sq mi). Its population growth rate over the decade 2001–2011 was 20.82%. Sheikhpura had a sex ratio of 926 females for every 1000 males, and a literacy rate of 65.96%. 17.13% of the population lives in urban areas. Scheduled Castes and Scheduled Tribes make up 20.60% and 0.10% of the population respectively.

=== Languages ===
Languages in Sheikhpura district (2011)
1. Hindi (56.9%)
2. Magahi (38.2%)
3. Urdu (4.70%)
4. Others (0.23%)

At the time of the 2011 census, 56.90% of the population in the district spoke Hindi, 38.17% Magahi and 4.70% Urdu as their first language.

== See also ==
- Munger University
- Munger division
- List of urban local bodies in Bihar
- List of villages in Sheikhpura district
- Maa Vatsala Bhavani Mandir Pharpar
