= Ashok Mahto gang =

1990s caste-based gang involved in massacre of upper caste people in Bihar, India

- Leaders: Ashok Mahto, Pintu Mahto
- Dates active: 1990s
- Groups: Kurmi, Koeri
- Headquarters: Nawada and Sheikhpura
- Wars: "Caste wars of Bihar"

The criminal Ashok Mahto gang, which was active in the Indian state Bihar, was led by Ashok Mahto and included Pintu Mahto. Ashok Mahto and his gang were responsible for the 2005 killing of Rajo Singh, a sitting Member of Parliament (Lok Sabha). Ashok Mahto was imprisoned but escaped from Nawada jail in 2002. Pintu Mahto killed three police officers during the prison breakout. The gang's leaders are said to belong to either the Kurmi or Koeri caste, and were supported by the backward castes in the Nawada and Sheikhpura regions. The Mahto gang was waging a war of retribution against the upper-caste Bhumihars. Mahto and his gang were responsible for the killings of a large number of Forward Caste people in the late 1990s.

== Mahto-Singh rivalry ==
Pradeep Mahto (centre), the nephew of Ashok Mahto with Pintu Mahto (third from right) and others at a conference.

The rivalry between Mahto and gangster Akhilesh Singh affected over 100 villages in the Nawada, Nalanda and Sheikhpura districts of Bihar. Between 1998 and 2006, the rivalry, which claimed over 200 lives in Nawada district, stemmed from caste conflict between Bhumihars and Koeris. The clash between the two groups would decide power over stone-crushing and sand-lifting arrangements in the affected districts. In 2003, the Mahto gang allegedly killed the father of a Member of the Legislative Assembly (MLA) Aruna Devi – the wife of Akhilesh Singh – and five others, including a six-year-old boy. It was reported the killings were in retaliation for the deaths of seven labourers who were allegedly killed by the Akhilesh Singh gang. In 2000 they attacked the same MLA's house and killed over 12 people.

The Mahto-Singh rivalry was a rivalry between two gangs for supremacy but a mobilisation of castes in support of each of these two gangs also took place. During the 2005 election, Aruna Devi, the wife of Akhilesh Singh, was a Lok Janshakti Party candidate for the region's legislative assembly. According to one of her supporters, the charges of murder and abduction upon Akhilesh Singh were frivolous and he had taken up arms to fight for the honour of his community, the Bhumihars. Ashok Mahto and his men were said to have taken over the responsibility for protecting the rights of the suppressed Koeri community and as other Backward Castes. Aruna Devi faced opposition from Pradeep Mahto, the nephew of Ashok Mahto, who also had several charges against him. Ashok Mahto was also responsible for killing a large number of upper-caste people in the area.

Akhilesh Singh Sardar continued to be a problem for Ashok Mahto Gang, eventually his wife Aruna Devi became MLA of Warisaliganj, Ashok Mahto Gangstill faces problems due to Akhilesh Singh Sardar, Ashok Mahto also Admitted that he was Tortured several times when he was in Prison by Akhilesh Singh Sardar.

== Arrests and trial ==
The Ashok Mahto gang consisted of gangsters such as Pintu Mahto, who was charged with nearly thirty murders and kidnappings, including the murder of three police officers and Congress politician Rajo Singh. Pintu Mahto was responsible for the Ashok Mahto gang in Warisaliganj and Sheikhpura, Nawada district. The Mahto gang also included Sharda Yadav, who was convicted of the massacre of 11 upper-caste people at the village Apshar, and of looting and abduction. Yadav was arrested with nine other aides in 2003. "Ariyari" Police also got success in arresting Bacchu Mahto, the sharpshooter of Mahto gang. Mahto was arrested in 2006, while he was travelling to court; Bihar Police Special Authority Police (SAP) officers carried out a procession in which Mahto, half-naked and bleeding, was dressed in garland of slippers. This incident proved controversial and the region's backward castes saw it as a punishment to the gangster for opposing Bhumihars. Mahto enjoyed considerable support among the backward classes; his public humiliation prompted questions such as; "Can the police humiliate an upper-caste gangster in a similar manner?"

After his attendance in the court, Superintendent of Police Amit Lodha said Mahto had admitted his involvement in the murder of Rajo Singh. Mahto, however, spoke about his links with JD(U) leader Rajeev Ranjan Singh and his close ties with Chief Minister Nitish Kumar. The court and the police did not take these claims seriously. The opposition Rashtriya Janata Dal and Lok Janshakti Party pressed for a CBI enquiry in the issue and asked Lalan Singh to resign. The Chief Minister came under pressure from the opposition.

In 2013, a court in Sheikhpura cleared Ashok Mahto, Shambhu Yadav and Anil Mahto of the murder of Rajo Singh. The plaintiffs were convicted for the murder of the erstwhile Congress leader of Sheikhpura but were cleared in the absence of evidence. As of May 2020, Ashok Mahto is incarcerated in Nawada jail. In 2022, Pintu Mahto was also acquitted in Rajo Singh murder case. As per some news reports, after being acquitted in the cases, Pintu Mahto later joined active politics and became a member of Janata Dal (United). His wife also contested elections to Bihar Assembly. In 2022, Sudarshan Singh, the grandson of Rajo Singh and the JDU's Member of legislative assembly admitted in the court that he doesn't want to carry the case further. Singh was main complainant in the Rajo Singh case. He had named 11 persons including Ashok Choudhary, Randhir Kumar Soni (former Sheikhpura MLA), gangster Ashok Mahto, RJD leader Lattu Yadav and Muneshwar Yadav as the accused in the murder of Rajo Singh. In June, same year, a court of Sheikhpura finally acquitted all the accused of the case due to lack of evidence.

== Significant incidents of violence ==
=== Manikpur killings ===
In a retaliatory action in Manikpur village, Sheikhpura district, Bihar, the Mahto gang shot seven people. Media reports stated that the incident was revenge for the earlier killings of four people in same village. According to sources, these clashes led to murders of 16 people in the region. The gang wars between Akhilesh Singh and Ashok Mahto were the cause of these attacks and counter-attacks.

=== 2003 Mahadipur-Jhour Mor killings ===
In 2003, in the Dariapur-Paschim tola of Nawada district, seven Dalits who were supporters of Ashok Mahto were allegedly killed by Mahto's rivals. In response to these killings, Kurmis killed five Bhumihars in Mahadipur-Jhour Mor, which is in the Warisaliganj police-station zone.

=== Accusation in accident of Sheikhpura MLA ===
In 2012, contemporary Member of Bihar Legislative Assembly from Sheikhpura assembly constituency, Randhir Kumar Soni and contemporary Superintendent of police Sheikhpura, Anusiya Ransingh Sahu accused that the Mahto gang was responsible for plotting the murder of the MLA in an accident. In this incident, it was reported that JDU MLA Randhir Kumar Soni was the target of Mahto gang, which plotted Bomb near his ancestral home, with a motive to kill the MLA. In connection with this case, in 2023, Ashok Mahto was admitted before a court in Sheikhpura, where he and another accused of his gang Abhijit Kumar denied the allegations against them. It was also reported that within the premise of court, a strong mob of people gathered in order to see Mahto, which was diffused by police using extra force.

=== Assassination of Block Development Officer ===
Mahto and his gang members were also accused in murder of Block Development Officer of Ariyari Block, Ashok Raj Vats in Sheikhpura in 2004. In 2022, the court acquitted Pintu Mahto in this case due to lack of evidence. Another court had earlier acquitted other accused too, which included the colleague of the officer, Raghuvir Mandal, who was made an accused after investigation began.

== In popular culture ==
In 2018, Indian Police Service (IPS) officer Amit Lodha, who was posted in Sheikhpura during the time of the arrest of Pintu Mahto, wrote a book titled "Bihar Diaries"; although the book does not name him, media reports match the story to the life of Pintu Mahto. In 2022, a Netflix web series named Khakee: The Bihar Chapter portrayed the story of Pintu Mahto, the sharpshooter of Ashok Mahto gang, which led to controversies, as Bihar government reportedly filed a suit against IPS Amit Lodha for misusing his position and indulging in corrupt practices. Following which, Lodha was suspended for his commercial deal with Netflix, while being an incumbent government officer. According to senior journalist Kanhaiya Bhelari, the unease in the ruling dispensation of Bihar was caused because of the portrayal of Mahtos as the villains in the web series. According to the reports, they are considered as heroes in many quarters of the state, as they are reported to have avenged deaths of many backward castes in the region of their influence in course of their war against the upper castes. Pintu Mahto, on whose life the web series is said to be based, also alleged IPS Lodha for defaming him and a particular community.

In 2023, in a meeting of a body called "Kurmi Mahapanchayat" in Warlisganj, which was attended by local leaders and some of the members of Zila Parishad, a call for release of Ashok Mahto was made. The attendants decided to initiate a processing in this regard up to the level of Member of Legislative Assemblies and higher echelon of government.

In February 2023, some newspaper reports also claimed that the release of Ashok Mahto was supported by former Union Minister Upendra Kushwaha, who sought relaxation provided to other criminals under the rule of Parole as reason to extend support to the idea of acquittal of Mahto.

== Later ==
Ashok Mahto was released from prison in 2023 after serving imprisonment of 17 years. In 2024, he married Anita Mahto in an inter-caste marriage as he was promised by Rashtriya Janata Dal leadership that he will get the party symbol to contest from Munger Lok Sabha constituency in 2024 Indian General Elections. Subsequently, Lalu Prasad Yadav fielded his wife Anita Mahto from Munger constituency against Lalan Singh in 2024 Lok Sabha polls.

== See also ==
- Chandan Kushwaha
- Afsar massacre
- Ramashish Koeri gang
