= Sunila Devi =

Indian politician

Member of Bihar Legislative Assembly
- In office 27 February 2005 – 24 November 2010
- Preceded by: Sanjay Kumar Singh
- Succeeded by: Randhir Kumar Soni
- Constituency: Sheikhpura

Personal details
- Born: 01 May 1963 Olipur Lakhisarai, Bihar
- Died: 7 July 2017 (aged 54)
- Party: Indian National Congress
- Spouse: Sanjay Kumar Singh
- Relations: Rajo Singh (father-in-law)
- Children: Sudarshan Kumar

Sunila Devi (1 May 1963 – 7 July 2017) was an Indian social activist and politician. She was an executive member of an NGO called People's Association for Research and Development, Patna which is working on financial inclusion of women and on the issues of women empowerment through micro-finance activities particularly in Nawada district of Bihar. She was wife of Sheikhpura former MLA Sanjay Kumar Singh alias Munna Singh who died in 2010, who was two times Member of Bihar Legislative Assembly before her. Now her son represents Barbigha earlier as Candidate of Indian National Congress but in 2020 Elections he joined Janata Dal (United).

== Political career ==
Sunila Devi had been grass root worker with her husband late Mr Sanjay Kumar Singh who had been two times MLA in the Bihar Assembly from Sheikhpura. Mr SK Singh had been also the State Minister of Rural Development. Sunila Devi is the daughter in law of well known politician and MP Shri Rajo Singh.

Sunila Devi won the election in the month of February 2005 from Sheikhpura constituency. Sunila Devi won in the re-election of October 2005 and lasted for next five years. She was member of the Committee on Women and Child Development in the Bihar Vidhan Sabha. She was one of the most regular MLAs in the assembly of Bihar. She was appointed acting President of Bihar Pradesh Mahila Congress and worked for almost two years. She handed over the reins to Shrimati Vinita Vijay as she wanted to concentrate more on the work of her own constituency of Sheikhpura. She contested the Lok Sabha elections as a candidate of Indian National Congress from Nawadah in the year 2009.

She did contest the assembly election from Sheikhpura in the year 2010 and lost by narrow margins to Shri Randhir Kumar Soni of JDU. She was suffering from cancer and died on 7 July 2017.
