= Mahasabha =

Mahasabha or Maha Sabha (lit. 'Great Assembly', transl. Congress) may refer to these organizations in India:

== Organization ==
- Adivasi Mahasabha, tribal political party in Jharkhand
- Ahir Yadav Kshatriya Mahasabha, Yadav caste-based organization
- Akhil Bharatiya Kshatriya Mahasabha, Rajput caste-based organization
- All India Kurmi Kshatriya Mahasabha, Kurmi caste-based organization
- All India Yadav Mahasabha, Yadav caste organization
- Andhra Mahasabha, for the formation of the Andhra Pradesh state
- Bharatiya Bauddha Mahasabha or Buddhist Society of India, founded by B. R. Ambedkar
- Bunkar Mahasabha, weaver trade union
- Digambar Jain Mahasabha, religious organization of Digambar Jains
- Ganga Mahasabha, for preservations of the Ganges river
- Hindu Mahasabha, Hindu nationalist political party
- Jat Mahasabha, Jat caste-based organization
- Jatav Mahasabha, Jatav caste-based organization
- Kshatriya Koli Mahasabha, Koli caste-based organization
- Nikhil Manipuri Mahasabha, Meitei Hindu organization

== See also ==
- Sanatan Dharma Maha Sabha, Hindu organization in Trinidad and Tobago
- Sinhala Maha Sabha, political party in British Ceylon
- Mayasabha, legendary palace mentioned in the ancient Indian epic Mahabharata
- Mayasabha (TV series), an Indian TV series
- Mayasabha – The Hall of Illusion, 2025 Indian film by Rahi Anil Barve
