= Backward Caste movement in Bihar =

Political and cultural advancement of Backward Castes

The Backward Caste movement in Bihar can be traced back to the formation of Triveni Sangh, a caste coalition and political party, in the 1930s, which was revived after the introduction of land reforms in the 1950s aimed at removing intermediaries from agrarian society. But, this drive could not succeed in bringing long-lasting changes in the condition of lower strata of society, as they lacked political representation and economic power. The period since land reform included caste conflicts and the class struggle which eventually led to a transfer of absolute political power in the hands of Backward Castes, who had been kept away from it earlier. The class struggle succeeded the struggle of some of the Upper Backward Castes against the sacerdotal authorities for improvement in their ritual status. By the 1990s, the conflict between upper-castes and the lower-castes continued, with nearly 17 massacres taking place during this time period. But with the advent of politics of social justice and the Janata Dal in the 1990s, the lower caste became more active politically.

== Agrarian relations in colonial Bihar ==
Agricultural society of Bihar

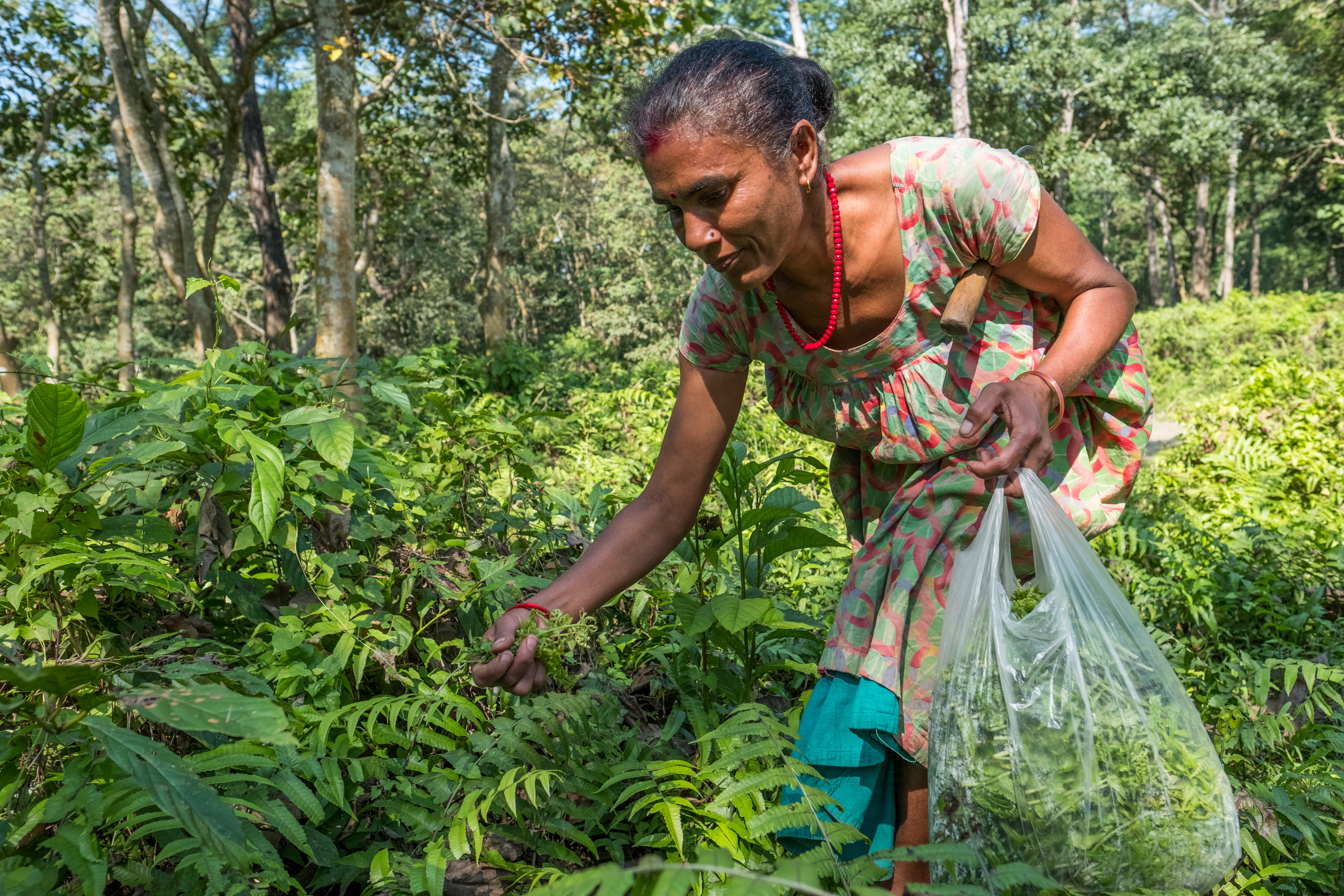
A women from the Musahar, the rat eater caste. Musahars are kept at the lowest end of hierarchy in caste society.

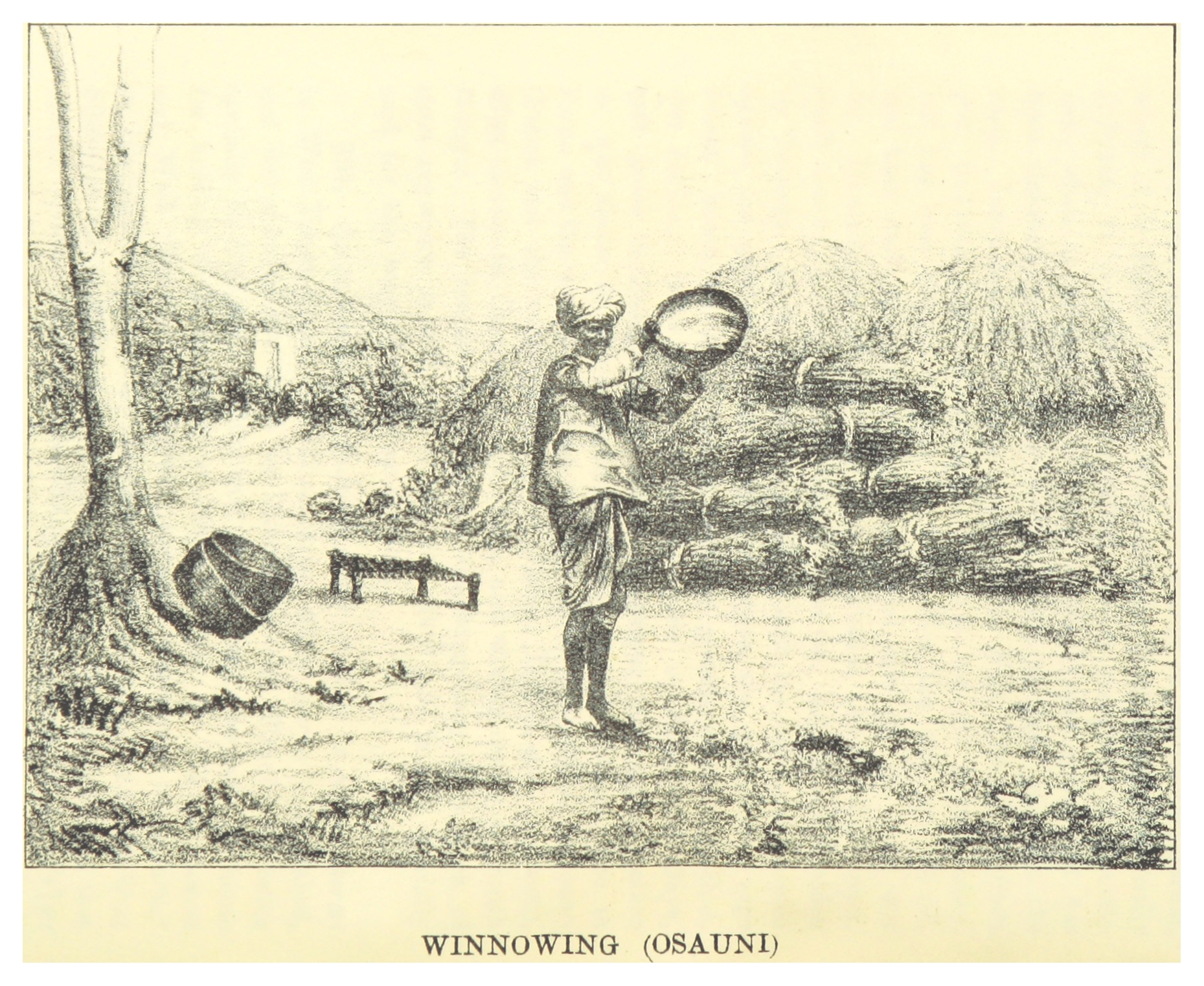
An 1885 work showing a peasant of Bihar undertaking winnowing operation, from the British Library.

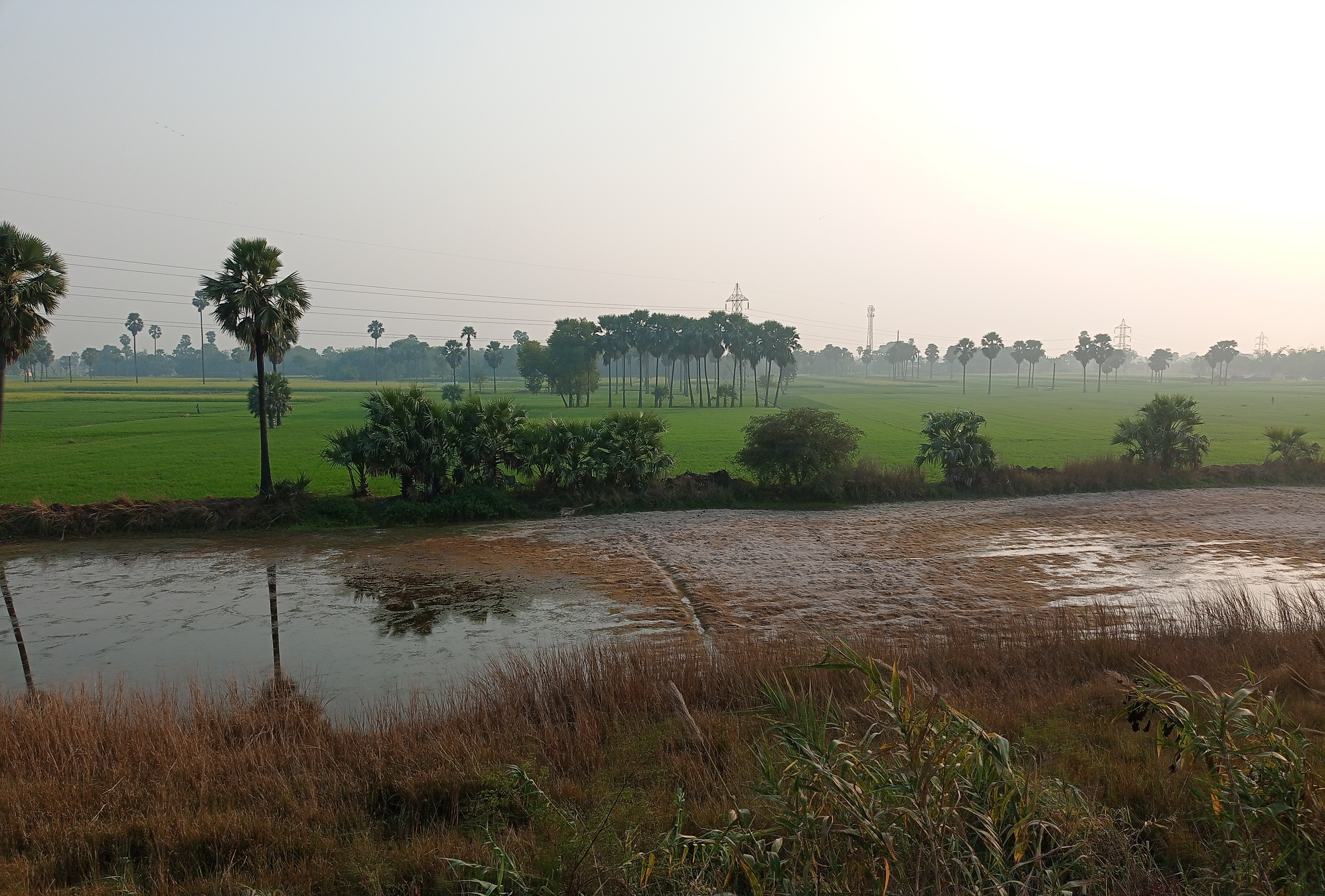
An agricultural field in Saran district of Bihar.

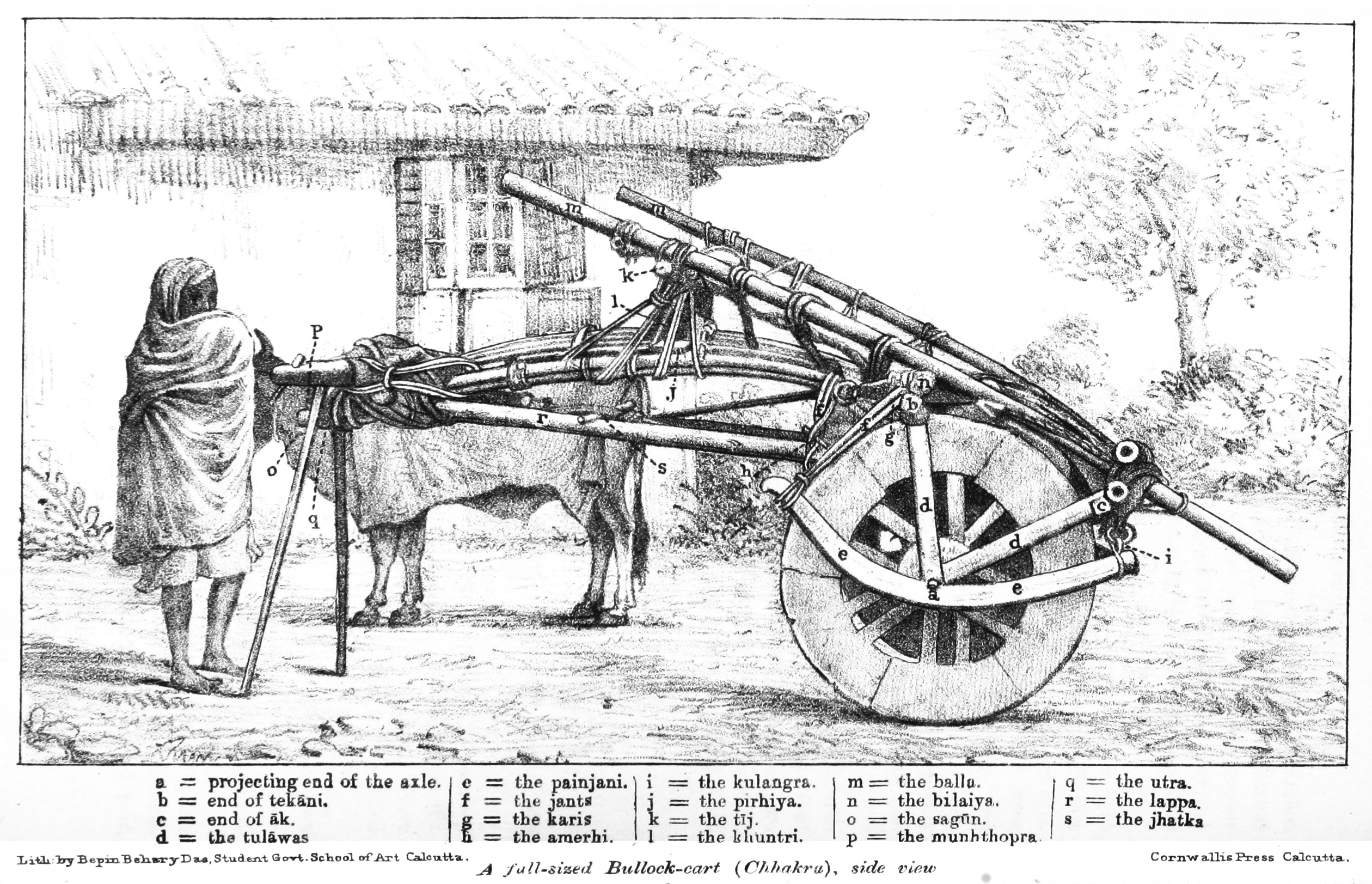
Art depiction of a bullock cart used by peasants in Bihar by GIERSON, George Abraham (1885).

Subordination and discrimination comprised the characteristics which defined agrarian relations in Bihar during the Mughal and East India Company period. Land holding defined the hierarchy of castes in agrarian society where the upper-castes which included Brahmin, Bhumihar and Rajputs worked for the Mughal central authority and were involved in the collection of land revenue and quelling any peasant revolts against their overlords, the Mughals. After the control of Diwani rights passed into the hands of the East India Company, an attempt to centralise the revenue collection was made through the Permanent Settlement of 1793 which settled the land, earlier owned by state, in favour of the Zamindars. The hierarchy, which was established in the agrarian society, was dominated by three upper-castes which were at the apex and comprised the Raja, the Maharaja and the petty landlords. However, many of the intermediate tenants who worked on the land also belonged to upper-castes, primarily to the Brahman and the Rajput caste. Only a few of them were Kayastha and Bhumihar.

A majority of tenant cultivators, however, belonged to the Yadav, the Kurmi and the Koeri castes, while the Dalits were included in the category of landless labourers, whose condition in this hierarchy was the worst compared to the others. The Permanent Settlement fixed 9/10ths of the land revenue collected by the landlord for the company for the remuneration of the revenue collectors (the landlords), the remaining 1/10th was secured. However, the landlords extracted excessive revenue from the tenants and the official collection in the records was always shown as 'low'. These upper-caste tenants, and those belonging to backward castes, were always assessed by dual yardsticks, and it was common for the latter to face discrimination while paying revenue. There also existed different "terms of tenure" for a cultivator or agricultural labourer, which depended upon their caste. Grierson in Bihar Peasant Life (1920), highlights the following proverb prevalent in Bihar's rural life to describe the inherent prejudices against the low caste peasants, the so-called rar Jāti:

Kaeth kichhu lelen delen, Brahaman khiyaulen
Dhan, pan paniyaulen, au rar jati latiyaulen
(A Kayasth does what you want on payment, a Brahman on being fed
paddy and betel on being watered
But a low caste man on being kicked.)

However, the "untouchables" or the Dalits were the worst sufferers in this hierarchy, as they were in kamia-malik (labourer-landlord) relationship with the landlords. Under this system, the landlords hired them to work off small debts given them in time of need. The condition for repayment was such that the interest increased and the debt of the father ended up being passed on to the son. In this way, the landless labourers become fully dependent on their master and a kind of bondage or serfdom prevailed.

== History of peasant struggle in Bihar ==
In the 19th century, the peasants of Bihar were involved in individual heroic struggles against the intermediaries in isolated events like the Santhal Hul rebellion (1855–56) and the Munda uprising of 1899–1901. Later, the Indigo revolt provided Gandhi with an opportunity to experiment with the peasantry. These events, however, were limited to local issues only, and the leadership was provided by local peasant leaders. There was a lack of an overall national perspective. Sahajanand Saraswati is known for leading a peasant struggle in some parts of Bihar, but its effects were limited to certain sections of farmers only. Karyanand Sharma is well known for leading the agrarian movement specially for his Barahiya Bakhast struggle in 1937–39. It was Sharma under whom the Communist Party of India (CPI) undertook some of the important peasant struggles in the 1950s, the most important being the Sathi farm struggle of Champaran.

=== Background of armed struggle ===
A document released by the Communist Party of India (Marxist–Leninist) Liberation (CPI (ML)) in 1986 titled Report From the Flaming Fields of Bihar which is referred to by authors like Ranbir Sammadar in their work, defines the nature of the agrarian society of Bihar in the period immediately succeeding the Green Revolution. The landed gentry, which mostly comprised the landlords of the upper caste and some of the emerging kulaks of the intermediate agricultural caste, was in conflict with the lower caste agricultural labourers and landless tenants often leading to armed struggle. The Socialist movement under Jay Prakash Narayan and others though growing stronger had little scope for acceptance in rural Bihar, which was facing the worst form of Feudalism. The state and the landlords often colluded against the Naxalite forces dominated by the landless labourers belonging to lower castes. The CPI (ML) was leading the struggle of the labourers and other groups and ultra-Left cadres belonging to Maoist Communist Centre (MCC) and Chhatra Yuva Sangharsh Samiti, an organisation based on the ideas of Jay Prakash Narayan, which later turned towards radicalism aimed at reducing growing class difference.

=== Caste and class composition of Maoist cadres ===
The land reforms primarily benefitted the middle peasant castes who were the tenants' upper caste landlords in the pre-independence period. These middle peasant castes were linked to the landlords in a variety of ways, including economic ties such as trade and money lending to supply credit and input in agricultural operations. Some of these castes left direct cultivation after successfully climbing the socio-economic ladder. Awadhiya Kurmi was one such community. The Bhumihars, who were included in both the landlord and middle peasant category, took up farming in some regions. They were known for their hard-working nature, contrary to the other upper castes whose ritual status forbade them from farming. The Koiris, another middle caste, were more attracted to the Maoist cadres because of the persistent banditry and oppression by the upper-castes. Sammadar argues that even the rich peasants of the Koiri and other middle castes were easily attracted to Naxal cadres because of their peculiar position in the caste hierarchy. Yadavs often made the class struggle difficult by coming between the two ends of agrarian society—landlords and the labourers. But, overall the question of wage, vested lands, social oppression, and 'caste solidarity' made these peasant castes sympathisers of Maoism.

A report by the Asian Development Research Group suggests that the Kurmi caste dominated the state committee of the radical People's War; members of the Yadav caste dominated the MCC. The CPI(ML), another radical outfit, had its support base among the Koeri and the Yadav castes, which shifted away to electoral politics after the foundation of Rashtriya Janata Dal (RJD translation: National People's Party. This shift led to the weakening of the 'liberation' in the Aurangabad and Nalanda districts, but the ideological commitment of the group, which also recruited from backward castes other than Yadav and some upper castes, saved it from complete ruin. However, the mass base of the Naxalite groups like the CPI (ML) remained dominated by fighters belonging to the Schedule Caste and the Extremely Backward Caste (EBC).

=== Sanskritisation and cultural transition in agrarian society ===
An important aspect of agrarian society on the Gangetic Plain was Sanskritization, the phenomenon of the historical and mythical underpinning of caste identities by the peasant and artisan castes in a bid to seek higher status. Among those who engaged in this effort, the Yadavs, Kushwaha and Kurmi were the most visible. For much of the 20th century, these peasant castes had tilled the fertile soil of the Indo-Gangetic Plain and were known for their hard-working nature and their cultivating skills. While many of them were small landholders and powerful tenants, a section of them included large landowners and tenant labourers. The varna system, upon which the British understanding of Indian society was based, continued to recognise them as Shudra against their claim of Kshatriya status from the beginning of 1900, because of the expertise of Brahmins in the caste-hierarchy related matters.

By claiming a noble Kshatriya past, these peasant communities challenged the socio-economic dominance of the elites. This drew antipathy from elite caste groups towards the Kshatriya reform movements, which were portrayed as a question of dignity and self-respect by the reformers. The first instance of this antipathy was the work of Kunwar Chheda Sinha who wrote a book on the anti-Kshatriya reform movement. It avoided the social and cultural transformation going on in contemporary society and connected the movement to the aspirations of Jati activists seeking employment in higher government posts and the rising concern with caste pedigree that was tied to the policy of hierarchical ranking in the census office. The book, published by Sinha in 1907, was circulated widely by the Rajput Anglo-Oriental Press to check the pace of upward mobility of the peasant communities in caste hierarchy.

This antipathy of the upper-caste against the Upper-Backwards continued until Congress established a strong position within the state. The peak of this antipathy was witnessed after the abolition of the Zamindari which followed Indian independence from British rule. The Congress made a successful coalition of the upper-caste, Dalits and Muslims and sidelined the agricultural castes which had benefitted from the zamindari abolition. According to Ranbir Sammadar, the antagonism created by the land reforms between the upper castes and the Other Backward Class (OBC) castes especially the Kurmi and the Koeris could never be overcome while the Yadavs, a herder caste were looked down upon with the greatest contempt by the former because of their professional practice. The Yadavs also worked as charvaha (herders) for the upper caste apart from traditional occupation of cattle husbandry and milk business had benefitted from the zamindari abolition but to a lesser extent than the other OBCs. The mockery or the (folk) jokes made by the upper-caste at their expense, "Yadav attains intelligence not before the age of 60 years", portrayed them as the most rustic stupid people. The Yadav were most discriminated caste amongst the upper-OBCs.

==== Kshatriya reform movement among Yadavs ====
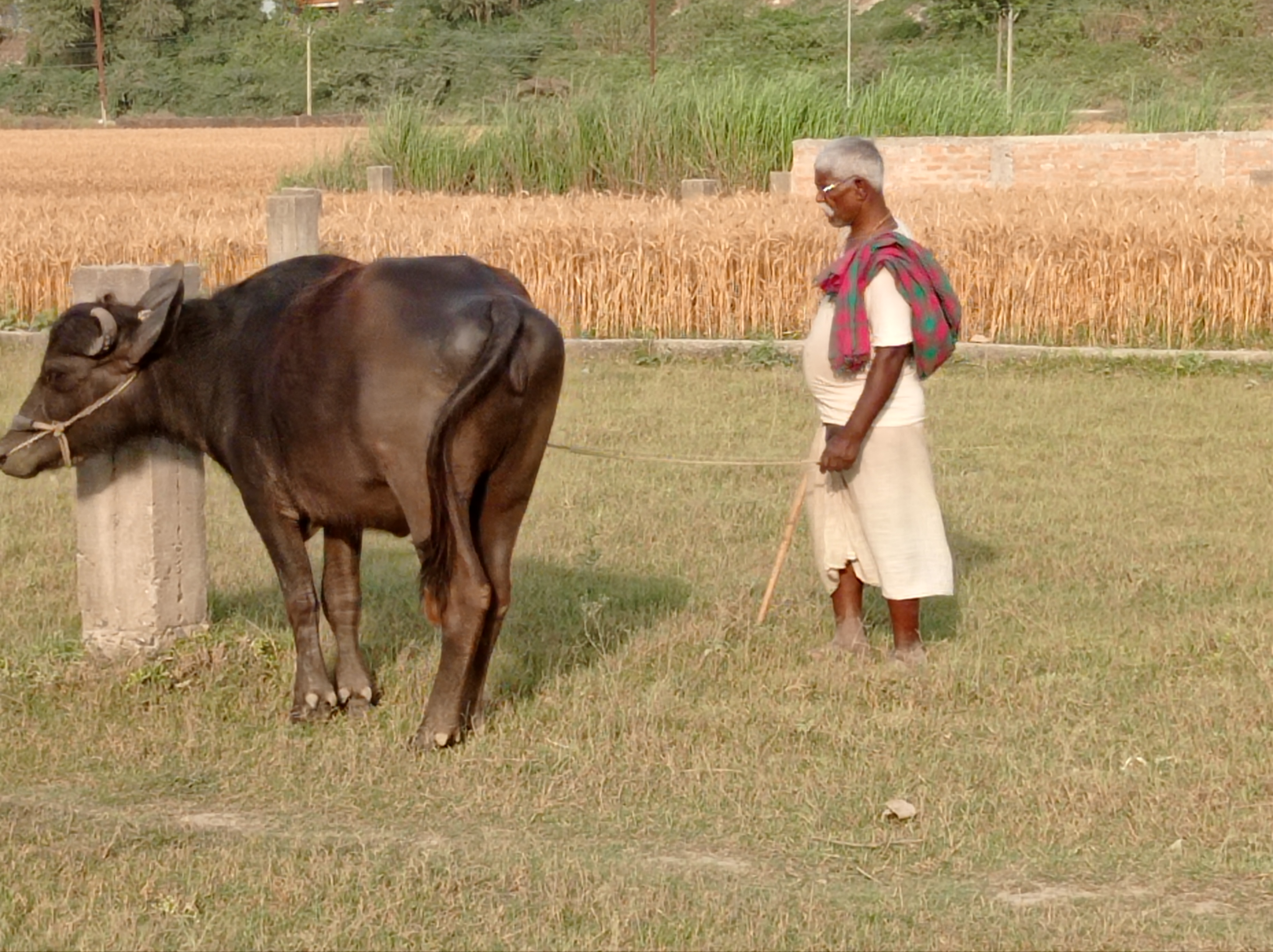
An old cattle grazer from Yadav caste in north Bihar, 2021.

The Yadavs, who claimed lineage from the mythological Yadu, were one of the first among the OBCs to claim kshatriya status, which was advocated alongside the control on womenfolk of the Jāti for the sake of the greater cause of the community. Baijnath Prasad Yadav, a Kshatriya reformer and a resident of Varanasi, advocated a curb on the independence of women and their participation in public festivals where they were prone to the pollution caused by impure contact of many low Jātis who roamed the crowd. He also claimed the root cause of all unnecessary household expenses is because of the fickle greediness of women. Despite the attempt of the upper-caste to boycott the reformers (Yadavs) with the aim of making it difficult to perform rituals for the attainment of Kshatriyahood, the better off among them arranged for the outsider Brahmins or the Nai (Hajjams) to initiate the rituals. Most often the officiation of the rituals also resulted in compelling the less fortunate Yadavs to prohibit their women from selling Goetha (cow dung cakes) in the market as an alternative source of income as it was against the status of the community aspiration of Kshatriyahood. However, because of their need women were allowed to do so, but in all other matters they were supposed to follow the practices of higher caste women. Apart from the men, the participation of womenfolk in the Kshatriya reform movement was also a notable phenomenon which (according to Pinch) was to raise their gender status. Consequently, demands for legislation on polygamy and education for both boys and girls became the central motto of Mahila Sammelans (conferences), which occurred in conjunction with the regional or national Jati sammelans.

==== Caste upliftment in Bhumihars ====
The Bhumihars were yet another caste seeking upliftment in their social status long before the OBC castes like the Yadav and the Kushwaha. They were referred to as "Babhan" in Bihar and were concentrated prominently there and in some parts of Uttar Pradesh. The Bhumihars were classified in the colonial censuses as Shudra along with the scribe caste, the Kayastha who were educationally equivalent to upper-castes. Before the formation of Bhumihar Brahmin Mahasabha in 1889 to seek the upliftment of socio-cultural status, there were several theories regarding the origin of Bhumihars. According to Jogendra Nath Bhattacharya, they belonged to some "lower caste" and were promoted to the status of a Brahmin by order of a Raja who wanted the presence of a large number of Brahmins to celebrate his religious festivals. The other popular narrative featured them as belonging to a tribe called the Bhuyans who gained land and claimed Brahmin status. According to another theory, a group of them were descendants of Rati Raut, a goala (a herder), or an offshoot of mixed marriages between Rajputs and Brahmins.

By the 1930s, the great depression had swept over India and income from agricultural land was dwindling. It became clear that as independence proceeded the zamindari would soon end. Caste associations began to manoeuvre community support for urbanisation. As a result, numerous schools and colleges were set up to impart education to community members to enable them to grab a share of power and provide an income opportunity through employment in government services. The Bhumihar Brahmin Mahasabha followed suit and its members became active in securing a share in the bureaucratic sector which was strongly dominated by the Kayasthas.

The Bhumihar Brahmin Mahasabha, led by Sir Ganesh Dutt, however, feared a split in 1920 after the emergence of Sahajanand Saraswati as the leader of the tenants and the poorer section of the caste. Later, Sahajanand Saraswati began playing an important role in organising tenants under the banner of the Kisan Sabhas. The Bhumihar's socio-political ascendency, however, remained unaffected after the Zamindari abolition drive of the Kisan Sabha. This helped to elevate S.K Sinha, a leader of the Kisan Sabha, to the post of chief minister.

==== The movement for caste upliftment in the Koeri and the Kurmi castes ====
The Kurmis were another agricultural caste present in Bihar and made up around three to four per cent of its population in the 1930s. They claimed kshatriya status like the Yadavs. The Ramanandi Sampraday, a socio-cultural movement launched to bring Shudra castes into the fold of monastic order, prepared the ground for this. By the late 19th century, the Kurmi leaders were the first among the low castes' leaders to claim a Kshatriya past by propagating stories through printed bulletins. These stories argued that the Kurmi and the Koeris (also called Kushwaha), a similar caste, were the descendants of the twin sons of Rama and his wife Sita, Lav and Kush. The various Koeris' subcastes, like the Kachhi and the Murao, also claimed descent from Kusha, but no attempt to merge these two groups (Kurmi and Koeri) ever occurred.

The first Kurmi caste association was formed in Lucknow in 1894 to protest the decision of the colonial government to reduce the quota in the police for the recruitment of Kurmis. However, the All India Kurmi Kshatriya Mahasabha was officially registered in 1910. Before it launched its movement for socio-economic emancipation of the caste, other organisations, like the Kurmi Sabha, formed prior to its foundation had made an unsuccessful attempt to fuse the castes like the Maratha, Kapu and Patidar together under one umbrella. Later, they tried to bring the Koeri and the Yadav together to form a political union called Triveni Sangh, which appeared dangerous to the Congress because it intended to mobilise the peasant caste sharing the same position on the socio-economic ladder. Consequently, with the formation of the Backward Class Federation by Congress, with the leadership and mobilisation by peasant leaders like Bir Chand Patel and Ram Lakhan Singh Yadav, the Triveni Sangh movement failed to create a long-lasting impact in politics.

According to scholars, the three castes failed to unite because of the co-option of Kurmi leaders (like Bir Chand Patel) and Yadav leaders (like Ram Lakhan Singh Yadav) by the Congress and also because of a superiority complex inherent in Yadavs vis-a-vis the Koeri and the Kurmi. By using pseudo historical grounds to give weight to their arguments, Yadavs claimed to be the natural leaders of the backwards which created a drift between the three castes. The Kurmi were known as a tribe rather than a caste before 1894. They were introduced into Hindu society as "hard working" agriculturists. Their predatory practices before 1894 led to the colonial government classifying them as a Criminal Tribe. The word "Kurmi" itself is understood to be derived from "tortoise", a tribal totem. The politicisation of the Kurmis and the gradual expansion of the caste made the Awadhiya of Patna, the Mahto of Chhotanagpur and the Dhanuk of north Bihar identity with them. As a result, these groups started calling themselves Kurmi. According to Ashwani Kumar:

...the Kurmis historically enjoyed the reputation of a violent caste and ruthless Kulak, that attempted to impose feudal dominance and consideration of hierarchy over Dalits. In fact, one of the early caste army in Bihar is directly attributed to the social ascendency of Kurmis in state.

In contrast, the Koeris, according to Kumar, are a horticulturist caste generally considered non-aggressive and disinterested in caste riots. They also attempted to seek Kshatriya status and formed the Kushwaha Kshatriya Mahasabha as their nodal caste association in 1922. Historically, Koeris have participated in increasing horizontal mobilisation of caste association of the backward castes in Bihar. They have also participated in armed movements under the banner of the CPI(ML) in the Patna, Bhojpur, Aurangabad and Rohtas districts of Bihar. In parts of the district of Bihar, they are infamous for their notorious, criminal affairs. India Today reported in 1994 that in some adjoining regions of Uttar Pradesh and Bihar, caste-based gangs of Koeri and Kurmi dacoits exist. They indulge in predatory practices against the inhabitants and members of rival caste gangs.

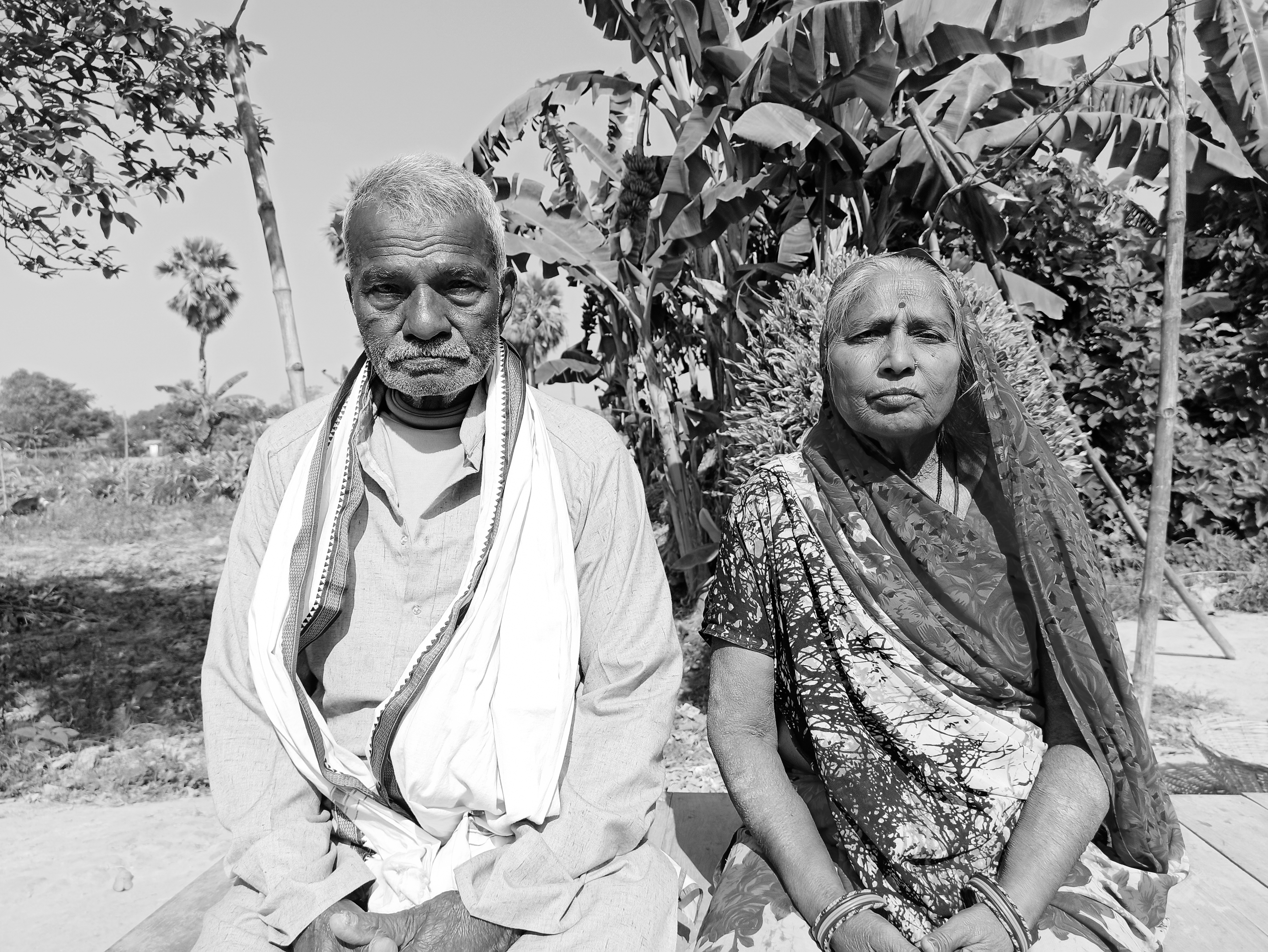
An elderly couple belonging to Koeri caste, from the Vaishali district of Bihar.

=== The lower backwards and the Dalits ===
The agrarian society of Bihar also consisted of a large section of unprivileged people who belonged to the lower backwards castes or the Dalit castes. Unlike the upper backwards— the Koeris, Kurmis and Yadavs, these caste groups hailed primarily from artisan backgrounds and had remained associated with a variety of low scale non-agricultural activities in the past. Prominent among them were the Nai (barber caste), the Mallaah (fisherman), the Noniya (Salt, shora maker) the Kumhars (potters) and the Barhai (carpenter). According to the Mungeri Lal commission report, the lower backwards were distributed across 108 caste groups and comprised 32% of the population of Bihar. But despite their large population, these castes had suffered marginalisation in the politico-economic corridor at the hands of both the upper castes and later the upper backwards. In the first year of Lalu Yadav's rule, some leaders of these caste groups attained political power. But with the budding of a personality cult, and Yadav's charisma and the popularity of his "muscular social justice" the leadership shifted to the Yadav caste completely.

Since these castes were geographically scattered and did not dominate in terms of population numbers in any constituency, they remained ineffective at creating any large-scale political impact on the state until 2001 when they won a large number of seats in the Mukhia and Zila Parishad elections and other bodies at the local level of government. Nitish Kumar is credited for bringing these caste groups into the political limelight with his focus on "Atipichhda" (Extremely Backward Castes). He created a social coalition of these castes along with his core support groups to oust Lalu Yadav from power.

Unlike artisan groups which were less discriminated against, other communities such as the Dalits have faced historical discrimination by the upper-castes. They were untouchables and mostly belonged to the landless agricultural labour class. They comprised 15.7% of the state of Bihar according to various censuses and were distributed primarily across Gaya, Nawada, Kishanganj, Aurangabad and Kaimur districts. The Indian National Congress in the Bihar provided mileage to Dalit politics in the pre-Mandal [1990] period. Leaders like Jagjivan Ram, who hailed from the Chamar caste, were the tallest leaders at the national level in Congress. The Dalits were the worst sufferers of routine caste massacres, which were a post-independence (1947) phenomenon in rural Bihar. They were later mobilised by the Maoist groups and asserted their rights in an agrarian setup. With the beginning of Mandal politics, the Dalits started supporting Lalu Yadav's politics of social justice but shifted to the Lok Janshakti Party after the emergence of Ram Vilas Paswan, a politically astute Socialist leader.

== Emergence of a new class in the peasantry ==
The changing agrarian relations and the zeal of the aspiring peasant castes to improve their cultural status resulted in face-offs between them and the elite "upper caste". The most common form of antipathy was a social boycott of the Backward Castes vowing to attain a Kshatriya identity, which was witnessed by the attempts of the "twice born" caste groups to make it difficult for the Yadavs to perform their necessary rituals. Later, this antipathy started turning into violence and caste riots, as witnessed in the Lakhochak riots (1925), where Bhumihars brutally attacked a Jāti conference of Yadavs.

On the morning of the 27th, before the arrival of the armed police at Lakho Chak, a large body of rioters advanced upon the village. The local police intervened to expostulate and were at once surrounded, the Sub-Inspector and Chaukidar [village watchman] received grievous injuries and the other constables of the party were hurt. After ill-treating the local police, the rioters retired temporarily but returned to the attack soon after the arrival of the S.P. [Superintendent of Police] with his force. The Superintendent and S.D.O [Subdivisional District Officer] went out to meet the advancing rioters and attempted to parley with them. The attacking party, however, to the number of about 3000 armed with lathis [heavy, metal tipped bamboo truncheons], axes, and spears continued to advance and the police were forced to fire to protect themselves and the Goalas. Although temporarily checked by the fire, the Babhan party continued to advance as they outflanked the police on both sides, the police were forced to retire fighting to the village site three or four hundred yards to their rear. The retirement was effected in good order and after the defending party reached the village the rioters withdrew.

— William Pinch
(Peasants and Monk in British India.)

Similarly, the Janeu movement, which urged the OBC castes to wear 'sacred thread', also met with the same fate and antipathy by the upper castes. The Janeu refers to a sacred thread won by the upper castes after the Upanayana ceremony, which allots the "twice born" status to them. When the Goalas of Bihar initiated the Janeu movement and started wearing the thread to uplift their cultural status in the first decade of the 20th century, they encountered strong resistance from the Bhumihars and the Thakurs.

Meanwhile, the economic prosperity of the upper caste was waning as they could hardly farm a productive yield on their large plots of land without the help of sharecroppers or hired labourers. In contrast, the peasant castes used the labour of their family members to extract more and more from their holdings. There also existed the notion of high 'ritual status' which forbade the upper caste from touching the plow in the period under consideration which is observed by revenue specialists like Denzil Ibbetson and mentioned by Susan Bayly, who blames them for being responsible for their own decline. Praising the peasant castes for their skill and hard work, Bayly argues that if they become indebted, it was not because of their deeds but because of the money lending Bania caste. Bayly observes that the Rajputs and the Brahmins who took pride in shunning the plough and secluding their womenfolk ended up selling their unproductive holdings.

=== Post Independence ===
The rural Bihar witnessed a remarkable shift owing to the liquidation of the Zamindari in the post-independence period. As a result, the big landlords and the Maharajas began losing control over their tenants, and the legal ways to keep tabs on them became ineffective. Growing Naxalite pressure and the Ceiling laws which made the possession of land above a set acreage an offence, forced upper caste landlords to sell off some of their vulnerable holdings, which were increasingly bought by the middle caste peasants. The Koeri, Kurmi and the Yadav peasantry pushed ahead of others. There also existed a bond between these peasant castes and their land, which they treated as their most productive asset. Arun Sinha mentions the variety of causes for the upper castes to sell their lands. While most of them were forced to sell by leftist 'land grab campaigns' and were happy with whatever prices they got, many of them sold their land it to pay for lavish weddings or the professional education of their children.

The reduction in landholdings of the upper-castes synchronised with their rapid urbanisation. By the 1970s, the standards of judging individual progress by urbanisation brought them more frequently to towns than the backward castes. Since the upper-castes hardly engaged in agriculture themselves in those days, their descendants (according to Sinha) chose to live in cities while the backwards remained deeply rooted in their villages.

== Backward caste politics after 1990 ==
=== 1990-2005 : Premiership of Lalu Prasad Yadav and Rabri Devi ===
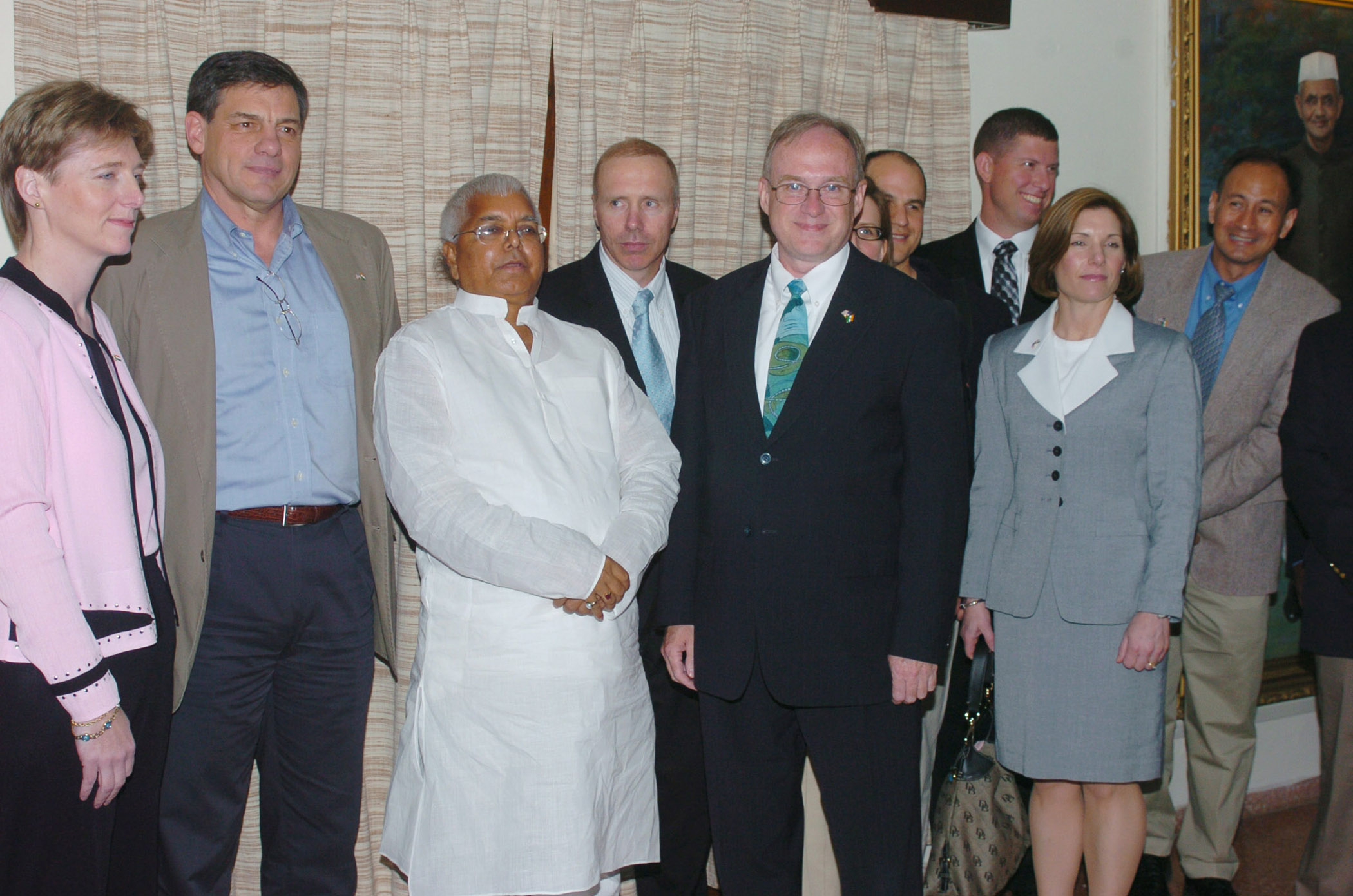
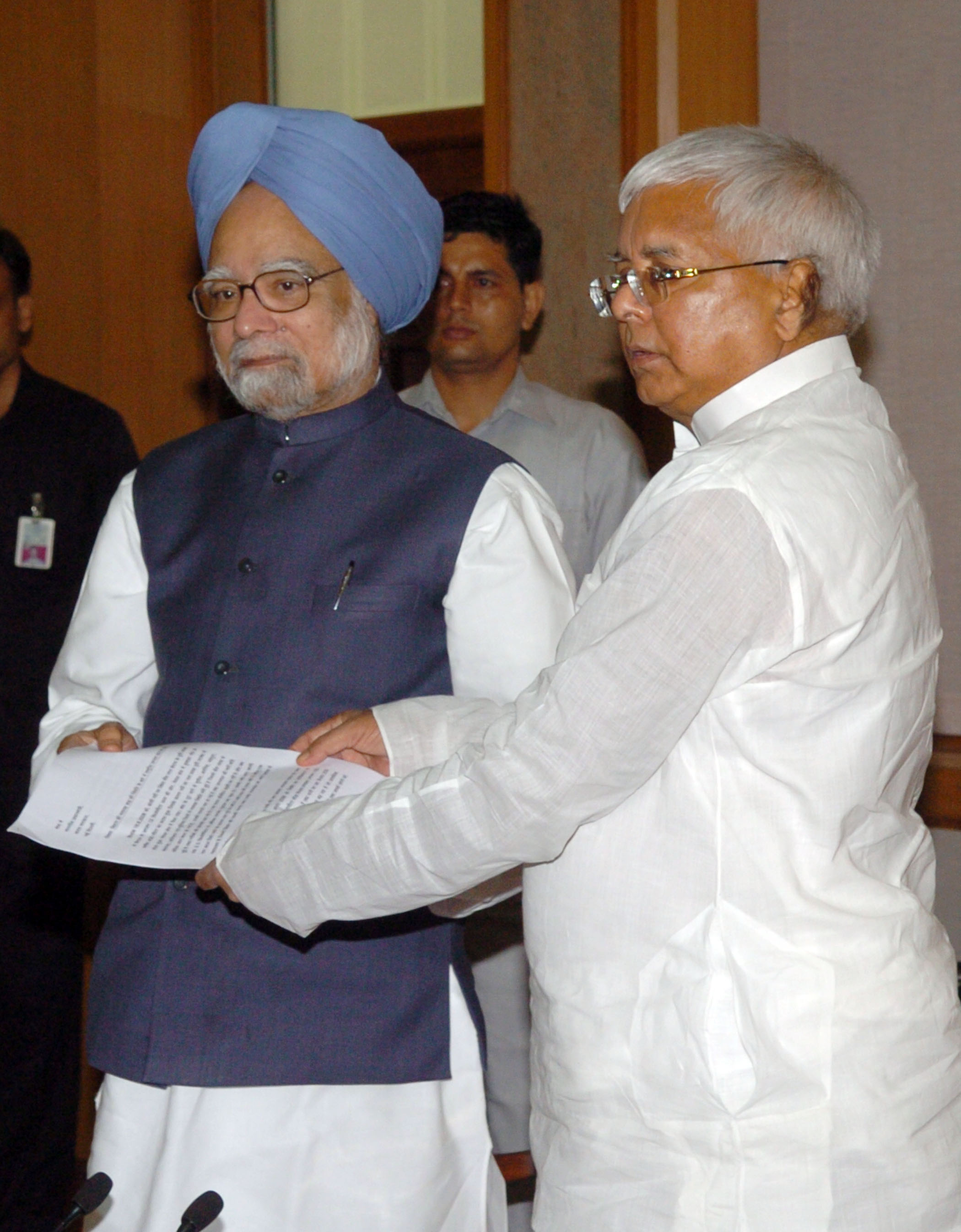
Lalu Prasad with the U.S. Financial Services Industry Study Group delegation led by Mr. David Blair when they called on him in New Delhi (Left); A delegation from Bihar led by the Union Railway Minister, Shri Lalu Prasad calling on the Prime Minister, Dr. Manmohan Singh, in New Delhi in connection with the prevailing flood situation in Bihar, on August 26, 2008 (Right).

Lalu Prasad Yadav was a product of student politics of the 1970s. Mathew and Moore classified the steps taken by Yadav after assuming power with the terminology "politics of state incapacity". The quota for the Other Backward and the and Extremely Backward classes was increased from the earlier ceiling. Violating reservation rules was made a punishable offence, and the statutes were passed to reserve 50% of the seats in the senate and syndicate of the universities. Apart from this, the selection of most of the vice-chancellors and the directors of the higher educational institutions was made overwhelmingly from the OBCs. In case of a dearth of qualified people from the OBCs to assume the position, the government chose to keep the position vacant rather than appointing a person belonging to an upper caste. This step transformed the nature and composition of educational institutions which the forward caste had monopolised until then. The three-percent quota for the economically weaker section irrespective of castes, which could have benefitted poor from the upper caste, was also abolished.

The minority upper caste had dominated the state's cooperative sector since independence. The government under Lalu passed several statutes to bring them under the firm governmental control. The dismantling exercise was also performed for some of the co-operatives, but in sharp contrast to this, the Bihar State Co-operative Milk Producers Federation (Comfed) prospered. The primary membership of these milk cooperatives was made up of members of the Yadav caste, who were traditionally herders and cattle rearers. Lalu Prasad also abolished the state tax on toddy to the benefit of the Pasi and proclaimed that fisherman (Mallaah) would have the right to fish from the river which had earlier depended on the will of the village strongmen.

The Charwaha Schools, established for the children of the cattle herders, drew widespread criticism from political circles, with some claiming it to be a mockery of elementary education and a hub of third-rate primary education. In the latter half of the 1990s, when Lalu was facing charges for his implicit involvement in the Fodder Scam, he was successful in convincing his core electorate, the backwards, that the "system", which is controlled by the upper castes, was hatching a conspiracy to finish him. The stringent action by the Chief Election Commissioner and the threat by the Bharatiya Janata Party to impose president's rule on the state, were linked as part of bigger conspiracy against him.

Lalu Prasad's governing style was a triumph of the backward castes. The backwards or the OBCs were encouraged to assert themselves in politics and local community relations, often resorting to violence, illegality and crime.

=== Confrontation with the upper-caste dominated bureaucracy ===
The Yadav's tenure also witnessed the emergence of a wide rift between the Dalits, the Scheduled Caste and the forward caste who were earlier aligned together against the rising Upper-Backward peasantry in political circles. A newly founded, armed militia, the Ranvir Sena of the Bhumihar caste was the prime reason behind this rift. The Sena had perpetrated ghastly massacres of the Scheduled Castes including those in Laxmanpur Bathe, where nearly 50 Dalits including women and children were murdered. Such an incident gave mileage to the Yadav's politics as the slogan, "Vikas nahi samman chahiy" (we need dignity not development) served as a guiding light for these capital scarce, downtrodden communities.

The retaliatory killings of the landlords by the Naxalites also took place, but these killings were less frequent than those of the past, due to the weakening of the organisational structure of the erstwhile Naxal groups. In the past, many militants from the Koeri, Yadav and the Kurmi landed caste were also attracted to these armed groups. For instance, the CPI (ML) drew its support largely from the Koeri and Yadav castes, but after the foundation of Rashtriya Janata Dal, the successor of Lalu's Janata Dal, the Koeri and Yadav militants were attracted to it being enamoured by the electoral politics. Similarly, according to a report by the Asian Development Research Institute the Kurmi caste used to held sway in People's War group while Yadavs were dominant in the Maoist Communist Centre. The infatuation of these castes with democratic politics left a leadership vacuum in the Naxal groups, which were now controlled from the top by leaders of upper castes while its local level workers belonged to Scheduled Castes.

Meanwhile, the massacres perpetrated by the Ranvir Sena and the support of some of the Samata Party leaders to lift ban from it polarised Dalits toward Yadav's party. It also exposed to them to the weaknesses of the Left leaving them with the sole choice to accept the leadership of Yadavs who formed the base of Rashtriya Janata Dal. Lalu also relied upon 'symbolism', to prove himself the real leader of the Backwards in contrast to former Congress leaders who, while visiting any village, used to visit only the upper-caste inhabited hamlets. Yadav sidelined the upper castes and used to visit only those regions inhabited by the Backward Castes and the SCs. In response to occasional demands for roads and physical infrastructure, the Yadav explained to the masses that development of infrastructure would benefit the contractors, the rich and the capitalists and for them 'dignity' is the real panacea.

A study done at the Jitwarpur village in the Araria district of Bihar explains the conception of 'dignity' and what it meant for the lower castes. 31% of the village's population belonged to the Brahmin caste who exercised control over most of the village's orchards and productive land. The upper-OBCs were five per cent and rest of the population was composed of the lower OBCs and the SCs. Prior to 1990, the Brahmin landlords were also dominant politically. They used to use foul language and accused the lower castes working in their fields of being lazy and greedy. Sometimes, public humiliation and physical intimidation were perpetrated against them but the lower castes were accustomed to it, as they depended on the Brahimns' lands for their livelihoods.of the Brahmins.

By 1990, during the Yadav's tenure, it was impossible in a normal situation for the Brahmins to win even a Mukhia election from the region, and local political power passed into the hands of Backwards. A member of the Mallaah caste took over the post of Mukhia. It became very difficult for the Brahmin landlords to abuse their workers to their face now, and they were helpless watching a Mallaah Mukhia hoist the national flag on the occasion of Independence and Republic day.

The bureaucracy was drastically undermined during the Yadav's rule because of the dominance of upper caste in it. Because of a lack of backward caste officers for appointment to important offices, the Yadav had to rely upon existing officers who had ferocious attitudes towards them. Hence, steps were taken to centralise the power of bureaucracy and subject it to the rigid control of democratically elected backward caste leaders. Many times, public humiliation of the officers also took place. One positive aspect of this step was the consolidation of self confidence of the poor and vulnerable who were harassed earlier by officialdom in situations involving "conflict with law". The political leaders were more easily approachable by the poor than the officials and were also close to them. Hence, a poor person coming from the lower caste benefitted from the de-elitisation of the administration. They could now approach their leaders to deal with the administration, which was still under the control of the elites. It was reported that many petitioners who visited the Yadav chief minister with their pleas witnessed the chief secretary of Bihar acting like a servant and passing the bowl for him to spit Paan and Khaini which was his custom. There also used to be a spitting bowl wherever he visited, not only for him but for other Paan-loving leaders of his party.

==== Surge in crime, and the criminal-politician nexus ====
The Yadav's rule also resulted in marginalisation of upper caste criminals from the high-value organised criminal activities formerly monopolised in the erstwhile governments by them. During 1990 to 1995, backward caste gangsters belonging primarily to the Yadav and the Bind (a subcaste of the Noniya) converted many areas of Bihar into their crime capitals. Organised crimes like kidnapping, timber-logging, ransom-killing and vehicle theft could thrive under political patronage, which was enjoyed by the upper castes during Congress's regime. But with the advent of Janata Dal patronage shifted to backward-caste criminals.

In most cases big merchants were the target and several incidents revealed the implicit involvement of the state machinery in the crimes. In one incident which took place in 1995, India Today reported that the personal physician of Lalu Prasad was accosted by a gang of youths when he was driving to his workplace. He was pulled from his car and the criminals fled with it. When the physician approached the chief minister's residence, he saw his car parked in front of it. To his surprise, one of the culprits was also sitting in the drawing room. After he complained, the Yadav allegedly advised him to pay the youths a sum of ₹ 50,000 for the return of his car, which he did.

=== Socio-economic condition of backward castes under Yadav and Kumar ===
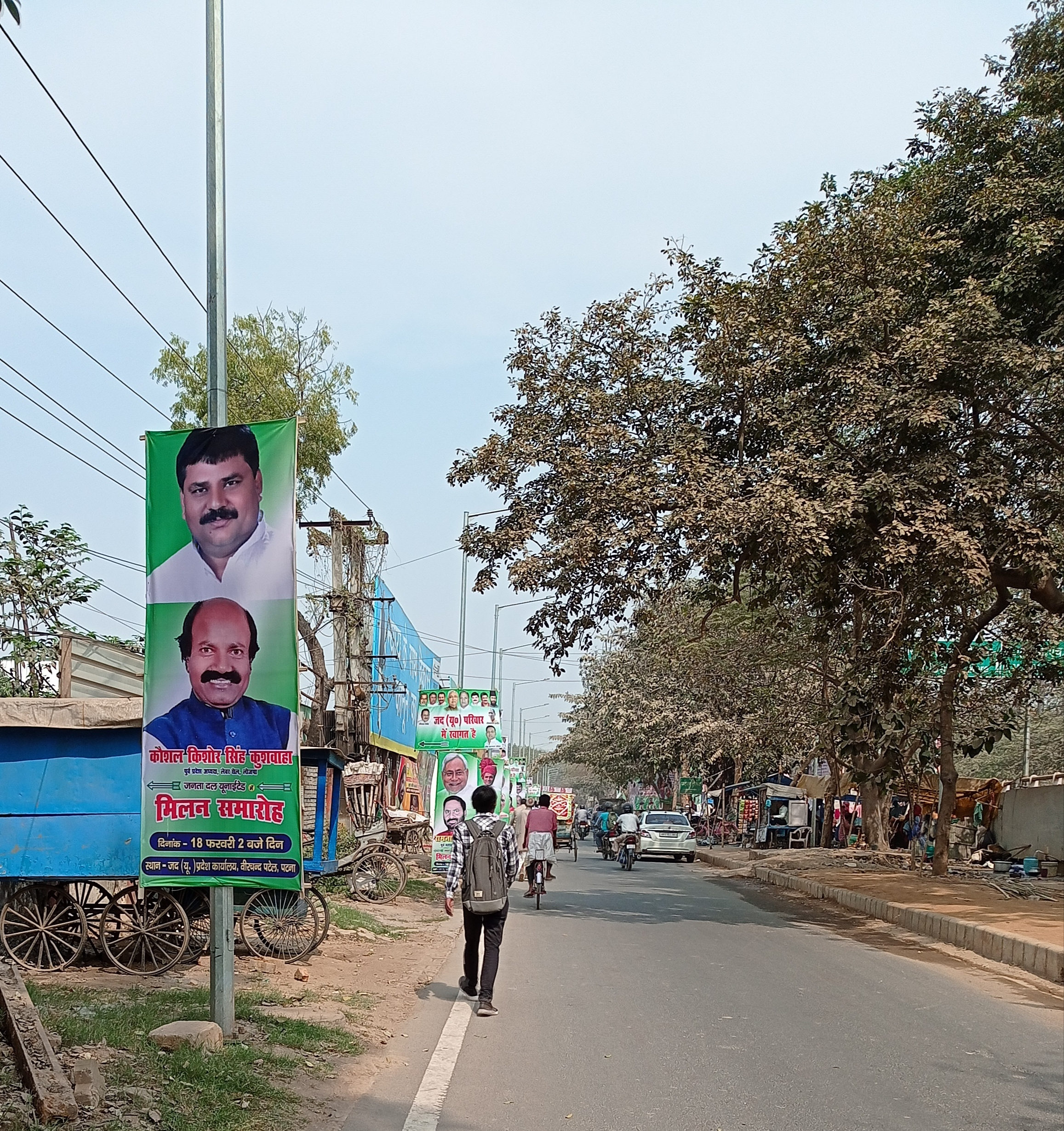
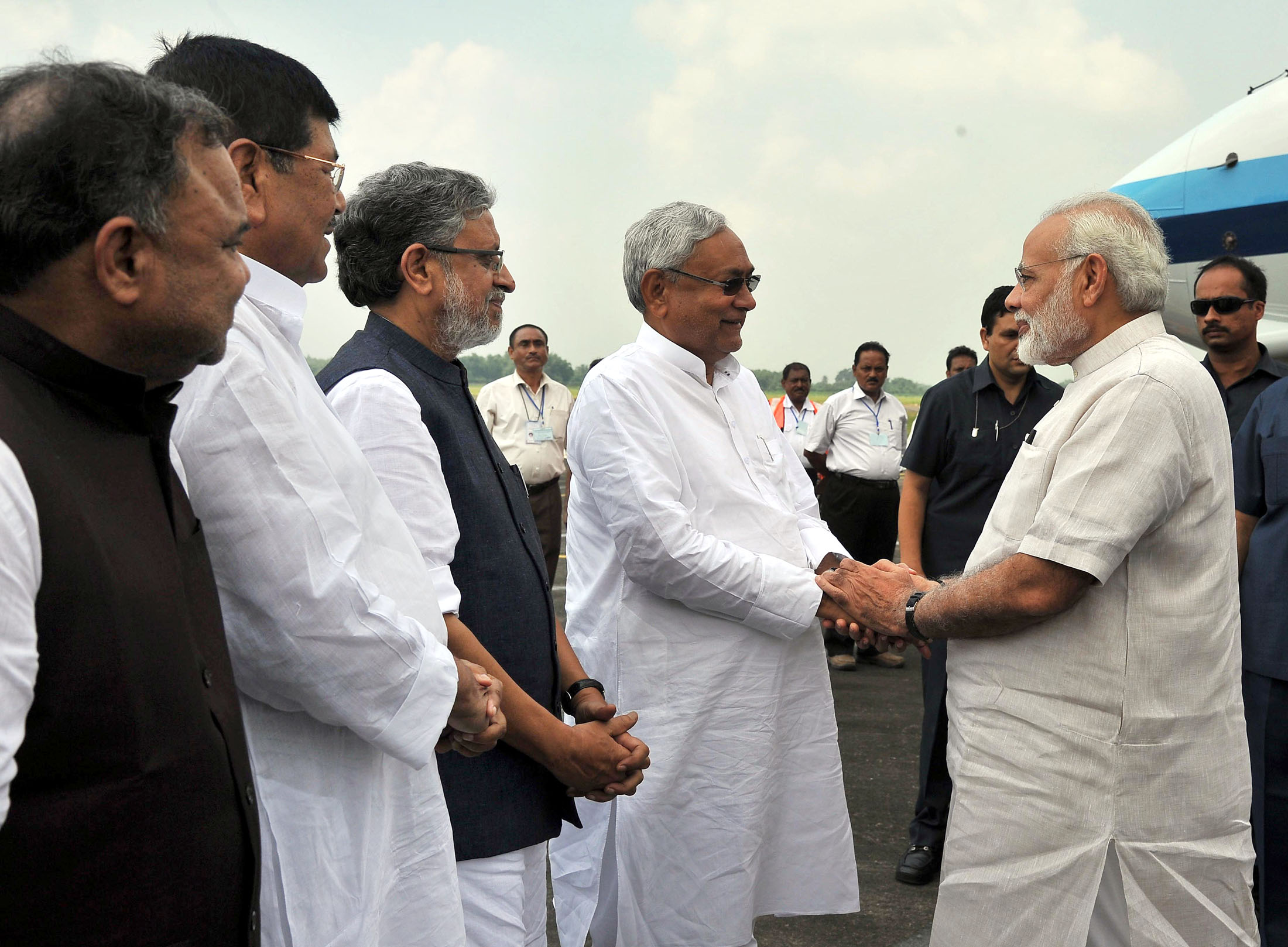
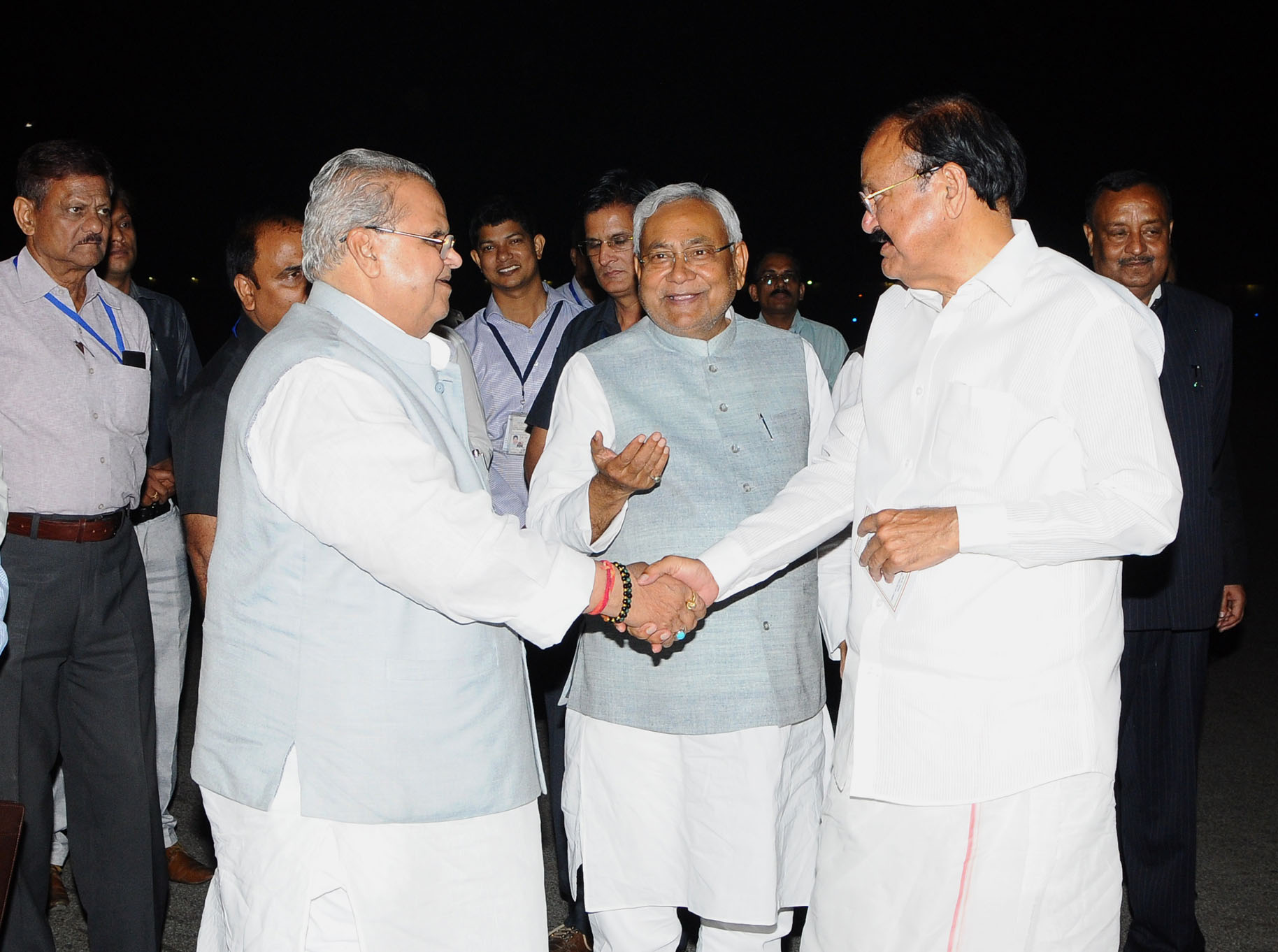
A propaganda poster of Janata Dal (United) featuring its Bihar state president Umesh Kushwaha, the party claims to represent non-Yadav OBCs, primary the Koeri and Kurmi caste, which were the core vote base of party.; Narendra Modi being received by the Chief Minister of Bihar, Shri Nitish Kumar and the Deputy Chief Minister of Bihar, Shri Sushil Modi, on his arrival, at Purnea, Bihar on August 26, 2017 & The Vice President, Shri M. Venkaiah Naidu being bid farewell by the Governor of Bihar, Shri Satya Pal Malik and the Chief Minister of Bihar, Shri Nitish Kumar, on his departure, in Patna, Bihar on March 22, 2018 (From left to Right).

Despite populist measures like the abolition of the zamindari and positive discrimination in the form of reservation for lower castes, the upper-caste retained their socio-economic dominance by exploiting loopholes in the existing legislation. For a long time, the Congress was backed by these upper-caste members who still managed to dominate the block, the bank and the thana (police stations)—the tripod of rural India which determines the hierarchy of status in their feudal society. The cultivation of association with these institutions was an important feature of the dominance enjoyed by the upper caste in rural agrarian society. With Mandal politics stirring up the state and the ascendency of OBC leaders like Lalu, the upper-caste lost their importance in state level politics. As ascertained through reports, the upper-caste made up 46% of the membership of the Bihar Legislative Assembly in 1952, a highly disproportionate number compared to their actual population in the state. With the rise of OBCs, they were reduced to 23% in 2000. But, they again managed to represent 30% of the membership of the assembly in 2010, when the Bharatiya Janata Party emerged as a significant player in the state's politics in alliance with Nitish Kumar. It is reported that while Lalu's policies affected the twice-born castes at the upper level of the state's administration and politics, the steps taken by Nitish to extend the caste-based quota to the local institutions and Panchayats, marginalised them at the grassroots level. Earlier, because of their influence in grassroot level institutions, the upper-caste managed to make the lower castes vote for the parties and candidates of their choice. In the absence of this, the upper caste depended totally upon the brokers—the lower-caste people, who manned these institutions—to assert themselves, making it a costly affair.

According to a 2018 report in ThePrint, it was ascertained that the failure of industrialisation in Bihar during Lalu's rule was not his responsibility but the failure of subsequent Chief Ministers since independence. Krishna Ballabh Sahay, Sri Krishna Sinha, Binodanand Jha and Lalu's other predecessors failed to promote industrial development, which could have benefitted the most rural state in India. Symbolic gestures like using the fire departments' water supply for bathing poor children, pitting a Musahar caste candidate, the lowest in the caste hierarchy, for parliamentary elections and naming the Bihar University after Dalit icon Bhim Rao Ambedkar popularised Lalu amongst the untouchables and the poor meanwhile alienating the upper-caste bastion in the state who dominated the bureaucracy and the media. Journalist Dilip Mandal argues that the upper-caste dominated media demonised Lalu, because of his robust stand on the enforcement of the quota for the lower castes, but it did not help to destroy his political strength in the state. In the 2015 assembly elections, the RJD and the Janata Dal (United) alliance humbled the Bharatiya Janata Party which won only 53 seats in the 243-member Bihar legislative assembly. Even after the initial success of the Nitish Kumar government in bringing some Bihari expatriates to reinvest in the state following his apparent control of crime, private sector investment in the state remained far from satisfactory taking a downturn because of a host of factors including an uncooperative bureaucracy. John Albert Rorabacher in his book Bihar and Mithila: The historical roots of backwardness writes:

The state has failed to attract private investors; although many Bihar expatriates at one time, began to reinvest in Bihar based on the apparent elimination of street crimes and the rapid increase in infrastructural development projects. This temporary euphoria quickly faded as private investors were faced with non availability of land for industries, power shortages and a lackadaisical and uncooperative bureaucracy.

In the period before Yadav's Janata Dal assumed power, industrial development was at a precarious stage compared to India's more developed states. According to reports, the share of the manufacturing sector was only 13.4% of the state's net domestic product in 1984–85.
