= Randhir Kumar Soni =

Indian politician

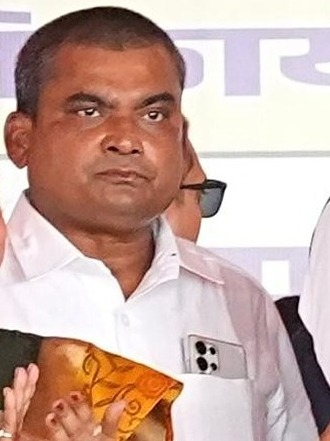

Member of Bihar Legislative Assembly
- Incumbent
- Assumed office 14 November 2025
- Preceded by: Vijay Kumar Yadav
- In office 24 November 2010 – 10 November 2020
- Preceded by: Sunila Devi
- Succeeded by: Vijay Kumar Yadav
- Constituency: Sheikhpura

Personal details
- Born: 1975 (age 50–51)
- Party: Janata Dal (United)

Randhir Kumar Soni (born 1975) is an Indian politician and a member of the Bihar Legislative Assembly. He is a member of the Janata Dal (United), who is currently representing the Sheikhpura constituency in the Bihar Legislative Assembly.

== Life and political career ==
In 2012, Soni survived a fatal land mine attack near Tanti bridge in the vicinity of his ancestral village, while returning from a visit to his constituency. In his statement to police, he accused Ashok Mahto gang of plotting this attack on his life. However, Ashok Mahto along with his two close accomplices, Pintu Mahto and Bachu Mahto were imprisoned at that time in connection with a murderer case (Manipur massacre) near Ariyari Police Station leading to dilution of charges made by him.
