= Pradeep Mahto =

Indian politician

Member of Bihar Legislative Assembly
- In office 2005–2015
- Preceded by: Aruna Devi
- Succeeded by: Aruna Devi
- Constituency: Warisaliganj

Personal details
- Born: Nawada, Bihar, India
- Party: Janata Dal (United)
- Relations: Ashok Mahto (Uncle)
- Parent: Laxmi Mahto

Pradeep Mahto alias Pradeep Kumar is a former Member of Legislative Assembly for the year 2005 and 2010 from the Warisaliganj (Vidhan Sabha constituency) of the Nawada region of Bihar. Mahto is a nephew and former associate of Ashok Mahto, the gangster who was indulged in a long drawn battle with Akhilesh Singh, another gangster of the region. The Mahto and Singh gang were arranged on the caste lines and proclaimed themselves as the group serving the interest of Kurmi and Bhumihar community of the region respectively.

== Biography ==
Mahto was born to Laxmi Mahto and has remained associated with his uncle's gang in initial years of life. After the arrest of Ashok Mahto he became the de facto leader of the faction which was associated with the several killings in the region particularly of upper-caste people and supporters of Akhilesh Singh. In 2000 Aruna Devi, the wife of Akhilesh Singh was elected as the Member of Legislative Assembly from the Warisaliganj. In 2005 she again contested the election from the same seat but this time on the symbol of Lok Janshakti Party. Aruna though won in February but in the by polls held in October in the same year, she lost to Pradeep Mahto, who became the MLA for the first time for a period of five years. Mahto had contested against her as Independent candidate. In 2010 Janata Dal (United) allotted its symbol to the Mahto from the Warisaliganj and he emerged victorious once again; but this time as a candidate of JD(U).

His association with JD (U) has a long history, and he has served as the district president of the party for Nawada, for a number of times. Mahto has been facing several criminal charges including those of murder. Pradeep's political career was shaken, when in 2015, Aruna Devi defeated him in the Assembly Election as the Bharatiya Janata Party candidate. In 2020 Pradeep though himself being unable to contest the assembly elections due to his conviction in one of the case launched his wife as independent candidate from Warisaliganj but she lost to Aruna once again. Mahto was also suspected to be the person behind 2001 Nawada Jail break case, in which, he surrendered in the court in the following years, though until then, he managed to get the ticket from JD (U). In the famous Jail break case, he was accused of facilitating the escape of his uncle Ashok Mahto.
