= Sanjay Kumar Singh (INC politician) =

Indian politician

Member of Bihar Legislative Assembly
- In office 1998–2005
- Preceded by: Rajo Singh
- Succeeded by: Sunila Devi
- Constituency: Sheikhpura

Minister of Rural Development Government of Bihar
- In office 2000–2003

Personal details
- Born: Bihar
- Died: 6 October 2010
- Party: Indian National Congress
- Spouse: Sunila Devi
- Children: Sudarshan Kumar
- Parent(s): Rajo Singh (father); Sharda Devi (mother)

Sanjay Kumar Singh alias Munna Singh was an Indian politician from Sheikhpura district of Bihar. He was son of former Sheikhpura MLA Rajo Singh. He died in 2010, who was two times Member of Bihar Legislative Assembly. His son represented Barbigha earlier as Candidate of Indian National Congress but in 2020 Elections he joined Janata Dal (United).
