= Anita Mahto =

Indian politician

Member of Bihar Legislative Assembly
- Incumbent
- Assumed office 14 November 2025
- Preceded by: Aruna Devi
- Constituency: Warisaliganj

Personal details
- Party: RJD
- Spouse: Ashok Mahto
- Education: Government Pharmacy Institute, Patna
- Occupation: Politics; Pharmacist

Anita Mahto is an Indian politician and former Chief Pharmacist from Bihar and a Member of the Bihar Legislative Assembly. Mahto won the Warisaliganj Assembly constituency of Nawada district on the RJD ticket in the 2025 Bihar Legislative Assembly election. She is married to Ashok Mahto.

== Political career ==
Anita Mahto political career gained prominence when she was fielded by RJD to contest the 2024 Lok Sabha elections from Munger, where she narrowly lost. Subsequently, she contested and won the Warisaliganj seat against the incumbent BJP legislator Aruna Devi, who is also the wife of another regional strongman. Anita Mahto's entry into politics is also seen as connected to her husband Ashok Mahto's influence and legacy in Nawada politics.

She has been actively involved in the political scene since 2024, with her candidacy reflecting the RJD's strategy to strengthen its hold in factionalized areas by leveraging local strongmen's families. Her electoral successes signify a blend of political influence and grassroots support in the region.

== See also ==
- Binita Mehta
