= Mahavir Choudhary =

Indian politician

Member of Bihar Legislative Assembly
- In office 1980–2000
- Preceded by: Nain Tara Dass
- Succeeded by: Ashok Choudhary
- Constituency: Barbigha

Personal details
- Born: Barbigha, Sheikhpura district, Bihar
- Political party: Indian National Congress
- Children: Ashok Choudhary

Mahavir Choudhary was an Indian politician from Bihar. He was a four time MLA from Barbigha Assembly constituency in Bihar.
