= Kumar Puspanjay =

Indian politician

Member of Bihar Legislative Assembly
- Incumbent
- Assumed office 2025
- Preceded by: Sudarshan Kumar
- Constituency: Barbigha

Personal details
- Born: 1963 (age 62–63)
- Party: Janata Dal (United)

Kumar Puspanjay (born 1963) is an Indian politician and a member of the Bihar Legislative Assembly. He is a member of the Janata Dal (United), who is currently representing the Barbigha constituency in the Bihar Legislative Assembly.
