= Vijay Samrat =

Indian politician

Vijay Kumar Yadav

Member of the Bihar Legislative Assembly
- In office 10 November 2020 – 14 November 2025
- Preceded by: Randhir Kumar Soni
- Succeeded by: Randhir Kumar Soni
- Constituency: Sheikhpura

Personal details
- Born: 5 June 1978 (age 48) Inday, Sheikhpura district, Bihar
- Party: Rashtriya Janata Dal
- Other political affiliations: Jan Adhikar Party (Loktantrik)
- Education: BA (Hons) From Bhagalpur University
- Occupation: Politician businessman

Vijay Kumar Yadav (born 5 June 1978) popularly known as Vijay Samrat is an Indian politician who was elected as a member of Bihar Legislative Assembly from Sheikhpura Assembly constituency in 2020 as a member of Rashtriya Janata Dal.

== Early life and education ==
Vijay Samrat was born to a Yadav family as Vijay Kumar to Ganga Kumar Yadav, former Chairman of Sheikhpura Municipal Council and Shyama Devi on 5 June 1978 at Inday, Sheikhpura district, Bihar.

He completed Bachelor of Arts in Labour and Social Welfare from Tilka Manjhi Bhagalpur University.

== Political career ==
=== 2015 election ===
Vijay Samrat had previously fought for 2015 Bihar Legislative Assembly election from the Sheikhpura Assembly constituency representing the newly launched Jan Adhikar Party (Loktantrik) of Pappu Yadav and he stood third with 18227 and lost to Janata Dal (United) candidate Randhir Kumar Soni and Hindustani Awam Morcha candidate Naresh Saw.

=== 2020 election ===
Vijay Samrat fought 2020 Bihar Legislative Assembly election from the same constituency representing the Rashtriya Janata Dal. He fought against then Member of Legislative Assembly Randhir Kumar Soni of Janata Dal (United) and Lok Janshakti Party candidate Imam Ghazali. He won with over 6000 votes.

== See also ==
- Sheikhpura Assembly constituency
