= Sudarshan Kumar =

Indian politician

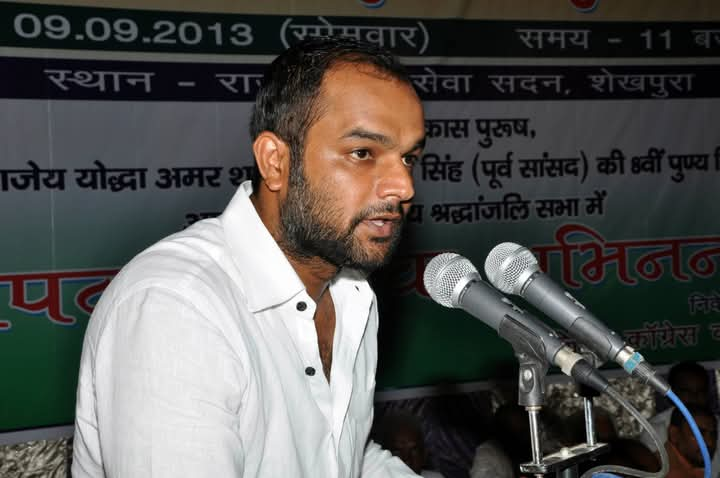
- Kumar in 2013

Member of the Bihar Legislative Assembly
- In office 2015–2025
- Preceded by: Gajanand Shahi
- Succeeded by: Kumar Puspanjay
- Constituency: Barbigha

Personal details
- Born: 18 July 1981 (age 44)
- Party: Janata Dal (United)
- Relations: Rajo Singh (Grand father)
- Parent(s): Sanjay Kumar Singh (father); Sunila Devi (mother)

Sudarshan Kumar (born 18 July 1981) is an Indian politician from Bihar and a two-time member of the Bihar Legislative Assembly. He won as a member of the Indian National Congress in the 2015 Bihar Legislative Assembly election, and won as a member of Janata Dal (United) from Barbigha in the 2020 Bihar Legislative Assembly election. He ran a third time as an independent, but lost to Kumar Puspanjay of JD(U). He is a grandson of Rajo Singh who was a two-time MP from Begusarai Lok Sabha and was also elected as an MLA five times from Sheikhpura and once from Barbigha. His father, Sanjay Singh Munna, was MLA from Sheikhpura twice, and his mother, Shrimati Sunila Devi, was MLA of INC twice from the Sheikhpura constituency.
