= Jamuara =

Jamwara
- Village Town
- Jamuara
- Founder: Syed Jamaluddin Shah son of Syed Ahmed Jajneri
- Postal Code of India: 811105

Jamwara is a small village located in Sheikhpura district of Bihar comes under Sheikhpura (Vidhan Sabha constituency). The village is surrounded on by three sides by mountains. Jamwara has two madrasas and one government middle school. The polling booth for elections is at Madrasa Jamia Habibiya. Jamwara has a mosque named Jamuara Masjid.
