= Aruna Devi =

Indian politician (born 1976)

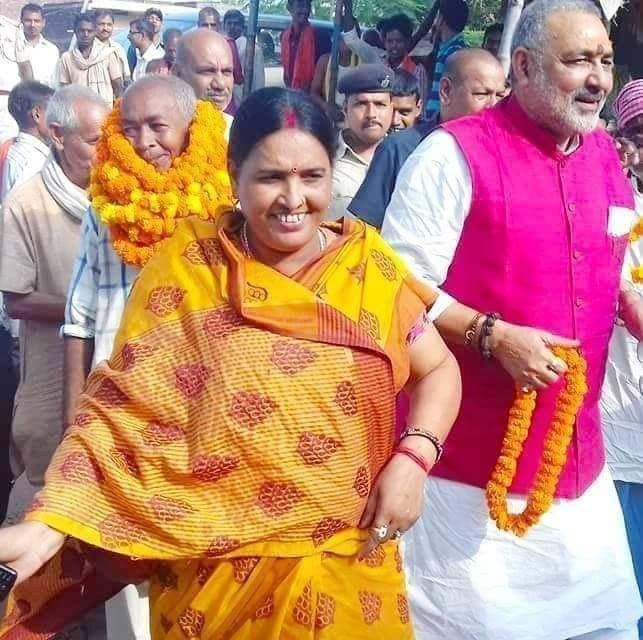
- Aruna Devi with Giriraj Singh (Right) on her nomination in 2020 election

Member of Bihar Legislative Assembly
- In office 2000–2005
- Preceded by: Ramashray Prasad Singh
- Succeeded by: Pradeep Mahto
- Constituency: Warisaliganj
- In office 2015–2025
- Preceded by: Pradeep Mahto
- Succeeded by: Anita Mahto
- Constituency: Warisaliganj

Personal details
- Born: 1 January 1976 (age 50) Kochgaon,Warisaliganj, Nawada, Bihar, India
- Party: Bharatiya Janata Party (2015-present)
- Other political affiliations: Indian National Congress (2005-15); Lok Janshakti Party (before 2005)
- Spouse: Akhilesh Sardar

Aruna Devi is an Indian politician from Bharatiya Janata Party, Bihar who is former Member of Bihar Legislative Assembly representing Warisaliganj of Nawada district. She was elected as the Member of Bihar Legislative Assembly for the first time in 2000 as an independent. She emerged victorious for the second time in February 2005 as Lok Janshakti Party candidate. She later joined Indian National Congress and contested as Congress candidate in October 2005 & 2010 but lost to Pradeep Mahto of Janata Dal (United). She later joined the Bharatiya Janata Party in 2015 and emerged victorious in 2015 as well as 2020. Her spouse is Akhilesh singh sardar.

== See also ==
- Kapildev Singh
- Vivek Thakur
- Bhartiya Janata Party
