= Shiv Shankar Singh =

Indian politician

Shiv Shankar Singh (born 6 March 1962) is an Indian politician from Bihar and the state General Secretary of the Lok Jan Shakti Party (LJP).

== Career ==
He contested the election from the assembly constituency of Kargahar in the Bihar Legislative Assembly elections in 2010.

== Background ==
Singh was born to a farmer family in Jagdishpur, Bihar to Late Hemraj Singh.
