= Sheikhpura Assembly constituency =

Assembly constituency in Bihar

- Constituency No. 169 for the Bihar Legislative Assembly

Constituency details
- Country: India
- Region: East India
- State: Bihar
- District: Sheikhpura
- Lok Sabha constituency: Jamui
- Established: 1951
- Total electors: 263,432
- Reservation: None

Member of Legislative Assembly
- 18th Bihar Legislative Assembly
- Incumbent Randhir Kumar Soni
- Party: JD(U)
- Alliance: NDA
- Elected year: 2025

Sheikhpura Assembly constituency is one of 243 constituencies of legislative assembly of Bihar. It is part of Jamui Lok Sabha constituency.

== Overview ==
Sheikhpura comprises CD Blocks Ghatkusumbha, Chewara and Ariari; Gram Panchayats Mahsar, Puraina, Pachna, Jamuara, Kaithawan, Gagari and Sheikhpura (M) of Sheikhpura CD Block.

== Members of the Legislative Assembly ==
Year	Name	Party
1952	Shah Mustaque	Indian National Congress
1957	Shri Krishna Sinha	Indian National Congress
1961^	Shiv Shankar Singh	Indian National Congress
1962	Shiv Shankar Singh	Indian National Congress
1967	Loknath Azad	Communist Party of India
1969	Loknath Azad	Communist Party of India
1972	Loknath Azad	Communist Party of India
1977	Rajo Singh	Indian National Congress
1980	Rajo Singh	Indian National Congress
1985	Rajo Singh	Independent politician
1990	Rajo Singh	Indian National Congress
1995	Rajo Singh	Indian National Congress
1998^	Sanjay Kumar Singh	Indian National Congress
2000	Sanjay Kumar Singh	Indian National Congress
2005	Sunila Devi	Indian National Congress
2005	Sunila Devi	Indian National Congress
2010	Randhir Kumar Soni	Janata Dal (United)
2015	Randhir Kumar Soni	Janata Dal (United)
2020	Vijay Kumar	Rashtriya Janata Dal
2025	Randhir Kumar Soni	Janata Dal (United)

== Election results ==
=== 2025 ===
2025 Bihar Legislative Assembly election: Sheikhpura
Party	Candidate	Votes	%	±%
JD(U)	Randhir Kumar Soni	82,922	50.77	+15.99
RJD	Vijay Kumar Yadav	60,375	36.96	−2.06
JSP	Rajesh Kumar	4,184	2.56	
Independent	Vijay Kumar	3,819	2.34	
AAP	Umesh Prasad Singh	2,834	1.74	
Independent	Sunil Kumar	2,368	1.45	
Bhartiya Lok Chetna Party	Devendra Kumar	2,048	1.25	
Independent	Virendra Paswan	1,685	1.03	
NOTA	None of the above	2,422	1.48	−0.58
Majority		22,547	13.81	+9.57
Turnout		163,341	62.0	+5.74
JD(U) gain from RJD		Swing		

=== 2020 ===
2020 Bihar Legislative Assembly election: Sheikhpura
Party	Candidate	Votes	%	±%
RJD	Vijay Kumar Yadav	56,365	39.02	
JD(U)	Randhir Kumar Soni	50,249	34.78	▲1.92
LJP	Imam Ghazali	14,552	10.07	
Independent	Rinku Devi	6,012	4.16	
Rashtriya Jan Jan Party	Dilip Kumar	4,900	3.39	
RLSP	Sanket Kumar	3,345	2.32	
Independent	Rajendra Prasad Gupta	2,233	1.55	
Independent	Gautam Kumar	1,371	0.95	
NOTA	None of the above	2,978	2.06	▲1.12
Majority		6,116	4.24	▼6.07
Turnout		144,463	56.26	▲0.66
RJD gain from JD(U)		Swing		

=== 2015 ===
Bihar Assembly election, 2015: Sheikhpura
Party	Candidate	Votes	%	±%
JD(U)	Randhir Kumar Soni	41,755	32.86	
HAM(S)	Naresh Saw	28,654	22.55	
JAP(L)	Vijay Kumar	18,227	14.35	
Independent	Jitendra Nath	9,882	7.78	
Independent	Reshma Bharti	4,759	3.75	
Independent	Shankar Suman	3,734	2.94	
SP	Vijay Kumar Yadav	3,129	2.46	
Independent	Dr.Dinesh Prasad	2,796	2.2	
Independent	Ramanuj Singh	2,711	2.13	
Independent	Naresh Mahto	2,316	1.82	
CPI	Krishn Nandan Yadav	2,185	1.72	
Independent	Hari Deo Prasad	1,956	1.54	
BMP	Pramod Kumar	1,191	0.94	
NOTA	None of the above	1,200	0.94	
Majority		13,101	10.31	
Turnout		127,060	55.6	
