= Ashok Choudhary =

Indian politician

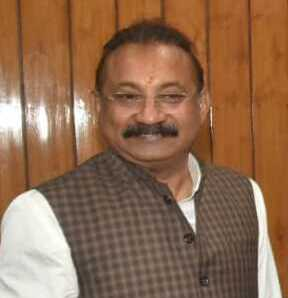

Minister of Food and Consumer Protection Government of Bihar
- Incumbent
- Assumed office 07 May 2026
- Chief Minister: Samrat Choudhary
- Preceded by: Bijendra Prasad Yadav

Minister of Rural Works Government of Bihar
- In office 15 March 2024 – 15 April 2026
- Preceded by: Nitish Kumar
- Succeeded by: Bijendra Prasad Yadav

National General Secretary of the Janata Dal (United)
- Incumbent
- Assumed office 26 September 2024

Minister of Building Construction Government of Bihar
- In office 16 August 2022 – 28 January 2024
- Preceded by: Maheshwar Hazari
- Succeeded by: Jayant Raj Kushwaha

Member of Bihar Legislative Council
- Incumbent
- Assumed office 2014

Minister of Education Government of Bihar
- In office 20 November 2015 – 26 July 2017
- Preceded by: Prashant Kumar Sahi

Member of Bihar Legislative Assembly
- In office 2000 – 2005
- Preceded by: Mahavir Choudhary
- Succeeded by: Ramsundar Ram Kanaujia
- Constituency: Barbigha

Personal details
- Born: Barbigha, Sheikhpura district, Bihar
- Party: Janata Dal (United)
- Other political affiliations: Indian National Congress
- Spouse: Neeta Keshkar Choudhary
- Children: 3 Shambhavi Choudhary, Mahika and Deshana
- Parent: Mahavir Choudhary (father)

Ashok Choudhary is an Indian politician from Bihar. He was a two time MLA from Barbigha Assembly constituency in Bihar. He was a Member of the Bihar Legislative Council since 2014. He also served as the Cabinet Minister for the Building Construction Department in the government. He also served as cabinet minister in the Department of Education. He was appointed Working President of Janta Dal United, Bihar.

== Personal life ==
His daughter Sambhavi Choudhary won the 2024 Indian General election from Samastipur loksabha constituency on the ticket of LJP-Ramvilas. 6200433683

== Career ==
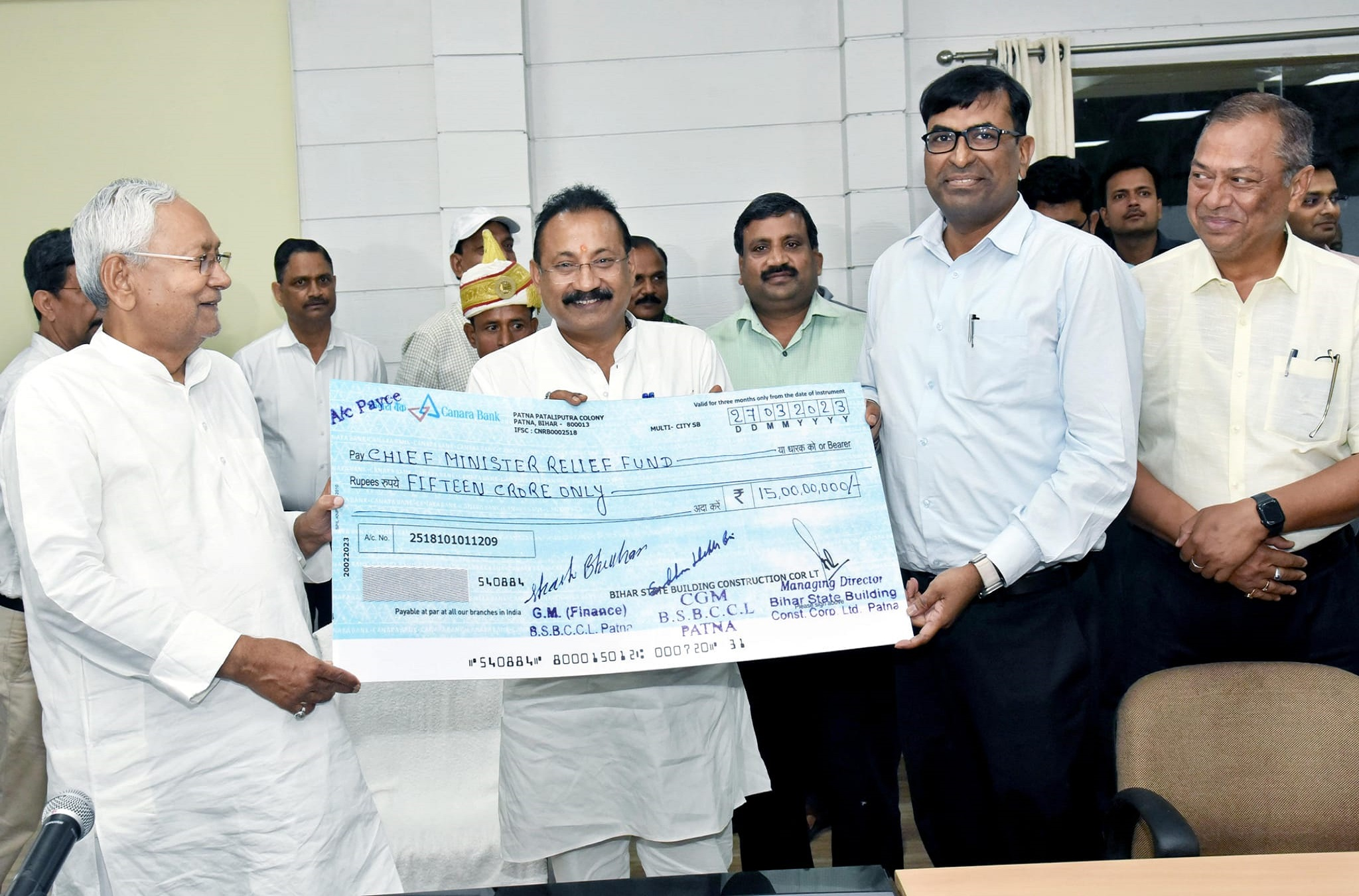
Chaudhary with Bihar Chief Minister Nitish Kumar, donating money in Chief Minister's relief fund.

In 2000 Bihar Legislative Assembly election, he won from Barbigha (Vidhan Sabha constituency) as an Indian National Congress candidate. Later in 2013, he was appointed Chief of Bihar Pradesh Congress Committee. In 2014, he was elected as Member of Bihar Legislative Council. He held the position as Minister of Department of Education and Department of Information Technology in Government of Bihar from 2015 to 2017 and 2020 to present.

In 2018, he left Indian National Congress and joined Janta Dal United. He was appointed Minister of Building Construction Department, Government of Bihar on 2 June 2019.

== Literary works ==
- Choudhary, Ashok; Choudhary, Shambhavi (22 August 2024). Bihar Ke Gandhi Nitish Kumar: Ashok Choudhary [Author]; Shambhavi Choudhary's Bestseller & Famous Book. Prabhat Prakashan. ISBN 978-93-5562-216-7.

== Controversies ==
Prashant Kishor has alleged that Bihar minister Ashok Choudhary, a close aide of former Chief Minister Nitish Kumar, acquired land worth Rs 200 crore in the past two years.
