= Warisaliganj Assembly constituency =

Assembly constituency in Bihar

Warisaliganj
- Constituency No. 239 for the Bihar Legislative Assembly

Constituency details
- Country: India
- Region: East India
- State: Bihar
- District: Nawada
- Lok Sabha constituency: Nawada
- Established: 1951
- Reservation: None

Member of Legislative Assembly
- 18th Bihar Legislative Assembly
- Incumbent Anita Mahto
- Party: RJD
- Alliance: MGB
- Elected year: 2025

Warisaliganj Assembly constituency is one of 243 constituencies of legislative assembly of Bihar. It is part of Nawada Lok Sabha constituency.

== Overview ==
Warisaliganj comprises CD Blocks Warisaliganj, Kashichak and Pakribarawan.

== Members of the Legislative Assembly ==
Year	Member	Party
1952	Chetu Ram	Indian National Congress
1957	Ramkishun Singh	Indian National Congress
1962	Ramkishun Singh	Indian National Congress
1967	Deo Nandan Prasad	Communist Party of India
1969	Deo Nandan Prasad	Communist Party of India
1972	Shyam Sunder Prasad Singh	Indian National Congress
1977	Ram Ratan Singh	Janata Party
1980	Bandi Shankar Singh	Indian National Congress
1985	Bandi Shankar Singh	Indian National Congress
1990	Deo Nandan Prasad	Communist Party of India
1995	Ramashray Prasad Singh	Indian National Congress
2000	Aruna Devi	Independent politician
2005	Aruna Devi	Lok Janshakti Party
2005	Pradeep Mahto	Independent politician
2010	Pradeep Mahto	Janata Dal (United)
2015	Aruna Devi	Bharatiya Janata Party
2020	Aruna Devi	Bharatiya Janata Party
2025	Anita Mahto	Rashtriya Janata Dal

== Election results ==
=== 2025 ===
2025 Bihar Legislative Assembly election: Warsaliganj
Party	Candidate	Votes	%	±%
RJD	Anita Mahto	97,833	48.72	
BJP	Aruna Devi	90,290	44.96	+8.47
JSP	Umesh Prasad	1,626	1.41	New
NOTA	None of the above	4,102	2.04	−0.3
Majority		7,543	3.76	−1.51
Turnout		200,814	58.11	+9.36
RJD gain from BJP		Swing		

=== 2020 ===
2020 Bihar Legislative Assembly election: Warisaliganj
Party	Candidate	Votes	%	±%
BJP	Aruna Devi	62,451	36.49	−14.7
INC	Satish Kumar	53,421	31.22	
Independent	Arti Sinha	39,363	23.0	
RLSP	Rajendra Prasad	4,755	2.78	
Rashtriya Jan Jan Party	Sumit Raj	2,382	1.39	
NOTA	None of the above	4,010	2.34	−0.55
Majority		9,030	5.27	−6.36
Turnout		171,126	48.75	−3.07
BJP hold		Swing		

=== 2015 ===
2015 Bihar Legislative Assembly election: Warisaliganj
Party	Candidate	Votes	%	±%
BJP	Aruna Devi	85,912	51.19	
JD(U)	Pradeep Mahto	66,385	39.56	
CPI	Ram Kishore Sharma	3,548	2.11	
JAP(L)	Rajiv Kumar	3,118	1.86	
Independent	Sindhu Sharma	2,822	1.68	
NOTA	None of the above	4,851	2.89	
Majority		19,527	11.63	
Turnout		167,821	51.82	
