= Barbigha Assembly constituency =

Assembly constituency in Bihar

Coordinates: 25.22°N 85.73°E

Barbigha
- Constituency No. 170 for the Bihar Legislative Assembly

Constituency details
- Country: India
- Region: East India
- State: Bihar
- District: Sheikhpura
- Lok Sabha constituency: Nawada
- Established: 1951
- Total electors: 232,576
- Reservation: None

Member of Legislative Assembly
- 18th Bihar Legislative Assembly
- Incumbent Dr. Kumar Puspanjay
- Party: JD(U)
- Alliance: NDA
- Elected year: 2025

Barbigha is one of 243 legislative assembly constituencies of legislative assembly of Bihar. It is part of Nawada Lok Sabha constituency. It is the home constituency of Bihar's first chief minister Shri Krishna Singh.

== Overview ==
Barbigha Constituency comprises CD Blocks Barbigha and Shekhopursarai; Gram Panchayats: Gaway, Audhe, Pain, Lodipur, Kosra, Kusumbha, Kare, Hathiyawan, Mehus & Katari of Sheikhpura CD Block.

== Members of the Legislative Assembly ==
Year	Member	Party
1952	Shri Krishna Sinha	Indian National Congress
1957	Shri Krishna Sinha	Indian National Congress
1962	Leela Devi	Indian National Congress
1967	Shiv Shankar Singh	Independent politician
1969	Shiv Shankar Singh	Independent politician
1972	Rajo Singh	Independent politician
1977	Nain Tara Dass	Janata Party
1980	Mahavir Choudhary	Indian National Congress
1985	Mahavir Choudhary	Indian National Congress
1990	Mahavir Choudhary	Indian National Congress
1995	Mahavir Choudhary	Indian National Congress
2000	Ashok Choudhary	Indian National Congress
February 2005	Ashok Choudhary	Indian National Congress
October 2005	Ramsundar Ram Kanaujia	Janata Dal (United)
2010	Gajanand Shahi	Janata Dal (United)
2015	Sudarshan Kumar	Indian National Congress
2020	Sudarshan Kumar	Janata Dal (United)
2025	Kumar Puspanjay	Janata Dal (United)

== Election results ==
=== 2025 ===
2025 Bihar Legislative Assembly election: Barbigha
Party	Candidate	Votes	%	±%
JD(U)	Kumar Puspanjay	61,882	42.85	+9.66
INC	Trishuldhari Singh	36,389	25.2	−7.89
Independent	Sudarshan Kumar	28,411	19.67	
JSP	Mukesh Kumar Singh	4,684	3.24	
Independent	Satish Kumar	2,373	1.64	
Independent	Sanjay Kumar Prabhat	1,446	1.0	
BSP	Murari Kumar	1,313	0.91	
NOTA	None of the above	6,197	4.29	+1.26
Majority		25,493	17.65	+17.55
Turnout		144,414	62.09	+8.96
JD(U) gain from INC		Swing		

=== 2020 ===
2020 Bihar Legislative Assembly election: Barbigha
Party	Candidate	Votes	%	±%
JD(U)	Sudarshan Kumar	39,878	33.19	
INC	Gajanand Shahi	39,765	33.09	−8.58
LJP	Madhukar Kumar	18,930	15.75	
Independent	Rakesh Ranjan	7,139	5.94	
Rashtriya Jan Jan Party	Gopal Kumar	4,458	3.71	
Independent	Deepak Kumar Sharma	1,770	1.47	
RLSP	Mritunjay Kumar	1,763	1.47	−26.08
Independent	Rajendra Prasad	1,110	0.92	
NOTA	None of the above	3,639	3.03	−2.02
Majority		113	0.1	−14.02
Turnout		120,166	53.13	−1.39
JD(U) gain from INC		Swing		

=== 2015 ===
2015 Bihar Legislative Assembly election: Barbigha
Party	Candidate	Votes	%	±%
INC	Sudarshan Kumar	46,406	41.67	
RLSP	Sheo Kumar	30,689	27.55	
Independent	Radhey Sharma	8,122	7.29	
Independent	Ravi Chaudhary	5,789	5.2	
NCP	Anil Shankar Sinha	4,420	3.97	
BSP	Preetam Kumari	2,661	2.39	
CPI	Rajeshwari Prasad	2,460	2.21	
Independent	Amritash Anand	1,461	1.31	
Independent	Mritunjay Kumar	1,452	1.3	
Independent	Yugeshwar Manjhi	1,188	1.07	
Independent	Krishna Murari Kumar	1,102	0.99	
NOTA	None of the above	5,626	5.05	
Majority		15,717	14.12	
Turnout		111,376	54.52	
