= Rajo Singh =

Indian politician (1928–2005)

Babu Rajo Singh
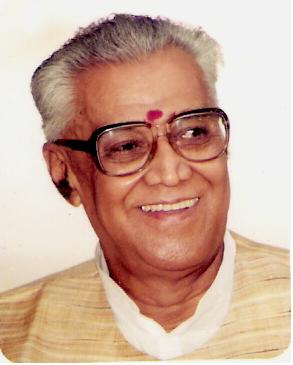

Member of parliament, Lok Sabha
- In office 3 March 1998 – 13 May 2004
- Prime Minister: Atal Bihari Vajpayee
- Preceded by: Ramendra Kumar
- Succeeded by: Lalan Singh
- Constituency: Begusarai

Member of Bihar Legislative Assembly
- In office 1977–2000
- Preceded by: Loknath Azad
- Succeeded by: Sanjay Kumar Singh
- Constituency: Sheikhpura
- In office 1972–1977
- Preceded by: Shiv Shankar Singh
- Succeeded by: Nain Tara Dass
- Constituency: Barbigha

Personal details
- Born: 25 March 1928 Hathiama, Bihar and Orissa Province, British India
- Died: 9 September 2005 (aged 77) Sheikhpura, Bihar, India
- Cause of death: Assassination by gunshot
- Spouse: Sharda Devi
- Children: Sanjay Kumar Singh
- Education: B.A. (Hindi) Educated at Hindi Sahitya Sammelan, Allahabad (Uttar Pradesh)
- Occupation: Politician
- Profession: Agriculturist Social Worker
- Cabinet: Member, Committee on Railways; Member, Committee on Petitions; Member, Committee on Official Language; Member, Consultative Committee, Ministry of Human Resource Development; Member, Committee on Absence of Members from sittings of the House; Member, Committee on Official Language; Member, Consultative Committee, Ministry of Communications

Rajo Singh (25 March 1928 – 9 September 2005), also known as Rajo Babu, was a politician from Bihar, India. He remained active in the electoral politics at the state and national level for over 50 years.

== Personal life ==
Rajo Singh was born in Bhumihar caste in Hathiama village in Sheikhpura district on 25 March 1928. He received his Bachelor of Arts in Hindi from "Hindi Sahitya Sammelan, Allahabad". He was married to Sharda Devi in the year 1939. He had a daughter Mrs Usha Singh married to veterinary doctor Dr S S Singh and son Late Sanjay Kumar Singh. His son Mr Sanjay had been two times MLA from Sheikhpura constituency and was a MOS for Rural Development under Shrimati Rabri Devi Govt. Mr Sanjay was married to Shrimati Sunila Devi, again two times MLA and also headed as party President of Bihar Pradesh Mahila Congress for more than two years. She resigned on her own due to ailing health and constituency over work and work of Civil Society Organisation PARD.

== Political career ==
He was a Member of the Bihar Legislative Assembly for six consecutive terms, that is, from 1972 to 1998. He was a Member of parliament, Lok Sabha from Begusarai constituency for two terms, between 1998 and 2004. He started his career as primary school teacher and participated actively in politics and social work. His passion to serve the masses soon forced him to leave the job of teacher as he was not able to do justice to social work and teaching at the same time. He resigned from the job of Primary School teacher and became full-time political worker. He became Gram Pradhan of Hathiyama Panchayat in the year 1952 and continued till 1972. He contested his first Legislative Assembly election from Barbigha as an independent candidate against Shri Shivshankar Singh (CPI), son of late Dr Shri Krishna Sinha, the first Chief Minister of Bihar, in 1972 and defeated him. He continued winning each election with higher margins in every successive election from 1972 onwards. He was denied ticket from Indian National Congress in the year 1985 and contested election as an independent member and defeated by record margin his rival Shri Rajendra Prasad Singh. In the year 1998, still being the member of Bihar Legislative Assembly he contested Parliamentary elections from Begusarai constituency and won the election against Shrimati Krishna Sahi of SAP with margins of 52,907 votes.

== Developmental politics ==
Rajo Singh started his political career as a volunteer for Dr Shri Krishna Sinha, the first Chief Minister of Bihar. It was easier working for him as Dr Singh's village Maur village is just few km away from his village Hathiyama. He learnt the art of politicking from him and he had witnessed every major development which took place in Bihar. As a member of legislative assembly he raised issues and slogans for development of Sheikhpura district. He had visited almost all the villages of Sheikhpura District either on foot or on cycle or in some of the villages on boat.

His priority of development was water for farmers, health centers, road connectivity and educational centers. He was lifetime senate member of Tilka Manjhi Bhagalpur University, Bhagalpur. There are number of Primary Schools, Middle Schools, High Schools and Colleges which have been built in the district with sole contribution of Rajo Babu. People had immense faith in him and his advice was taken seriously and people donated land for school buildings and money for construction and running of these schools. He was also instrumental in carving out a small place like Sheikhpura into district during the period of Shri Lalu Prasad Yadav, the then Chief Minister of Bihar.

He contributed in development at the cost of personal safety and once Mr Nitish Kumar, Chief Minister of Bihar the then Cabinet Minister of Railway were pelted with stones at Sheikhpura when foundation stone for the 122-km long railway line between Sheikhpura and Daniala Neura was laid. Shree Singh was the one who made Sheikhpura to be District from a block on 31 July 1994 in the regime of Lalu Prasad Yadav.

== Cooperative movements ==
Rajo Singh was instrumental in forming large number of Primary Agriculture Cooperative Society in the district of Monghyr and specially in the villages of Sheikhpura district. He had intimate knowledge of functional aspects of grass root societies. He understood the pain and plight of poor farmers and he knit them well to assure that they received loans for all their needs specially for farming. He organised few of the Cooperatives Seminar and first such was held at Kaithma Panchayat. He being a Gram Pradhan himself of Hathiama Panchayat he sensitized the other Gram Pradhans and formed large no of PACS. He was also the President of Sheikhpura Vyapar Mandal.He was very close to Shri Mathura Prasad Singh, who Headed the bihar state cooperative bank at that time.

He became member of Council Director of Biscomaun in the year 1967 to 1976 and then again in 1979 to 1988. He held important positions in the Cooperatives Institutions as under Director of Bihar State Housing Co-operative Federation from 1977 to 1980. President of Bihar Co-operative federation from 1980 to 1986. Director of National Co-operative Federation from 1984 to 1985. President Member of Advisory Committee from 1969 to 1976 and again from 1979 to 1988. Member of Co-operative Council in 1986. Administrative Member in National Co-operative Handloom Development Bank Association from 1986 to 1988. Chairman of Bihar State Land Development Bank, Patna from 1986 to 30 Jul 1988. As Chairman of Bihar State Land Development Bank Patna ensured 84% of debt recovery and 98% of allotted loan was distributed to farmers and established a record. He was awarded Uday Bhan Singh trophy by then the Agriculture Minister Mr. Bhajan Lal of GOI.

== Death ==
Singh was shot dead allegedly by Ashok Mahto gang of Nawada and Sheikhpura region. In his confession Mahto unfolded his linkage to several Janata Dal (United) leaders including chief minister Nitish Kumar. According to his confession and statement of police, the killing of Singh was a revenge killing of 9 persons in 2001 including Rashtriya Janata Dal Sheikhpura president Kashi Yadav.

== See also ==
- List of assassinated Indian politicians

== Bibliography ==
- India today, Volume 15, Part 3. Thomson Living Media India Ltd. 1990.
- The Times of India directory and year book including who's who. Times of India Press. 1983.
- Asian survey, Volume 26, Issues 7-12. University of California Press. 1986.
- Democracy in India. Oxford University Press. 2001. ISBN 978-0-19-565561-2.
