= Kurmi =

Indian agricultural caste

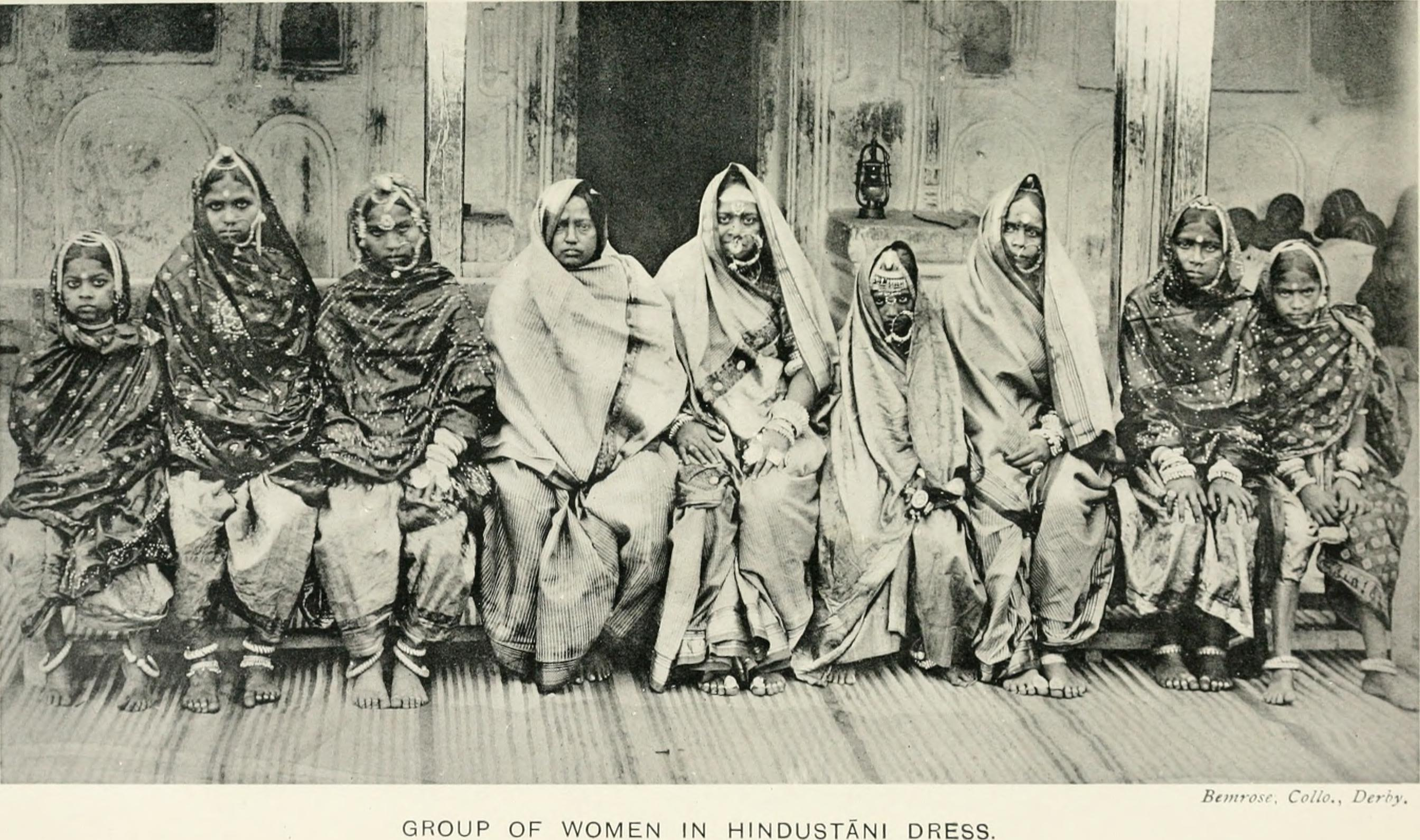
- A group of Kurmi women in traditional "Hindustani dress"
- Classification: Other Backward Class
- Religions: Hinduism (majority); Islam; Christianity
- Languages: Awadhi; Bhojpuri; Bagheli; Hindi; Urdu; Nepali
- Country: India; Nepal
- Region: Awadh; Bhojpur; Madhesh; Lumbini
- Related groups: Kudmi Mahato; Kudumbi; Kunbi

Kurmi is a traditionally non-elite caste of tillers in the lower Gangetic plain of India, especially southern regions of Awadh, eastern Uttar Pradesh and parts of Bihar and Jharkhand. The Kurmi came to be known for their exceptional work ethic, superior tillage and manuring, and gender-neutral culture, bringing praise from Mughal and British administrators alike.

== Etymology ==
There are several late-19th century theories of the etymology of Kurmi. According to Jogendra Nath Bhattacharya (1896), the word may be derived from an Indian tribal language, or be a Sanskrit compound term krishi karmi, "agriculturalist." A theory of Gustav Salomon Oppert (1893) holds that it may be derived from kṛṣmi, meaning "ploughman".

According to Suniti Kumar Chatterji (1926), the Bengali word kuṛmī or kurmī derives from Sanskrit kuṭumbin. This view is endorsed in Ralph Lilley Turner's A Comparative Dictionary of the Indo-Aryan Languages (1962–1985), where he lists cognates across many Indo-Aryan languages including Bhojpuri, Bihari, and Eastern Hindi.

== History ==
=== Eighteenth and nineteenth centuries ===
With the continued waning of Mughal Empire rule in the early 18th century, the Indian subcontinent's hinterland dwellers, many of whom were armed and nomadic, began to appear more frequently in settled areas and interact with townspeople and agriculturists. Many new rulers of the 18th century came from such nomadic backgrounds. The effect of this interaction on India's social organisation lasted well into the colonial period. During much of this time, non-elite tillers and pastoralists, such as the Kurmi, were part of a social spectrum that blended only indistinctly into the elite landowning classes at one end, and the menial or ritually polluting classes at the other.

The Kurmi were famed as market gardeners. In western and northern Awadh, for example, for much of the 18th century, the Muslim gentry offered the Kurmi highly discounted rental rates for clearing the jungle and cultivating it. Once the land had been brought stably under the plough, however, the land rent was usually raised to 30 to 80 per cent above the going rate. Although British revenue officials later ascribed the high rent to the prejudice among the elite rural castes against handling the plough, the main reason was the greater productivity of the Kurmi, whose success lay in superior manuring. According to historian Christopher Bayly,

Whereas the majority of cultivators manured only the lands immediately around the village and used these lands for growing food grains, Kurmis avoided using animal dung for fuel and manured the poorer lands farther from the village (the manjha). They were able, therefore, to grow valuable market crops such as potatoes, melons and tobacco immediately around the village, sow fine grains in the manjha, and restrict the poor millet subsistence crops to the periphery. A network of ganjs (fixed rural markets) and Kurmi or Kacchi settlements could transform a local economy within a year or two.

Cross-cultural influences were also felt. Hindu tillers worshipped at Muslim shrines in the small towns founded by their Muslim overlords. The Hindu Kurmis of Chunar and Jaunpur, for instance, took up the Muslim custom of marrying first cousins and of burying their dead. In some regions, the Kurmis' success as tillers led to land ownership, and to avowals of high status, as noted, for example, by Francis Buchanan in the early 19th century among the Ayodhya Kurmis of the Awadh. Earlier, in the late eighteenth century, when Asaf-Ud-Dowlah, the fourth Nawab of Awadh, attempted to grant the kshatriya title of Raja to a group of influential landed Ayodhya Kurmis, he was thwarted by a united opposition of Rajputs, who were themselves (as described by Buchanan), "a group of newcomers to the court, who had been peasant soldiers only a few years before ..." According to historian William Pinch:

Rajputs of Awadh, who along with brahmans constituted the main beneficiaries of what historian Richard Barnett characterizes as "Asaf's permissive program of social mobility," were not willing to let that mobility reach beyond certain arbitrary socio-cultural boundaries. ... The divergent claims to status in the nineteenth century (and earlier) illustrate the point that for non-Muslims, while varna was generally accepted as the basis for identity, on the whole little agreement prevailed with respect to the place of the individual and the jati within a varna hierarchy.

Although the free peasant farm was the mainstay of farming in many parts of north India in the 18th century, in some regions, a combination of climatic, political, and demographic factors led to the increased dependence of peasant cultivators such as the Kurmi. In the Benares division, which had come under the revenue purview of the British East India Company in 1779, the Chalisa famine of 1783 and the relentless revenue demand from the Company reduced the status of many Kurmi cultivators. A British revenue agent wrote in 1790, "It unfortunately happened that during the famine aforesaid a great proportion of the Kurmis, Kacchis and Koeris were in this district as well as in others supplanted by Brahmans ... " and bemoaned the loss of agricultural revenue in part due to, "this unfavourable mutation amongst the cultivators ..."

In the first half of the 19th century, economic pressures on the large landowning classes increased noticeably. The prices of agricultural lands fell at the same time that the East India Company, after acquiring the Ceded and Conquered Provinces (later the North-Western Provinces) in 1805, began to press landowners for more land revenue. The annexation of Awadh in 1856 created more fear and discontent among the landed elite, and may have contributed to the Indian rebellion of 1857. Economic pressures also opened marginal areas to intensive agriculture and turned the fortunes of the non-elite peasants, such as the Kurmi, who worked them. After the rebellion, the landowning classes, defeated but still pressed economically in the new British Raj, attempted to treat their tenants and labourers as people of lowly birth and to demand unpaid labour from them. According to historical anthropologist Susan Bayly,

In some instances these were attempts to stave off decline by reinvigorating or intensifying existing forms of customary service. Elsewhere these were wholly novel demands, many being imposed on 'clean' tillers and cattle-keepers like the Ram- and Krishna-loving Koeris, Kurmis and Ahirs ... In either case, these calls were buttressed with appeals to Sanskritic varna theory and Brahmanical caste convention. ... Kurmi and Goala/Ahir tillers who held tenancies from these 'squireens' found themselves being identified as Shudras, that is, people who were mandated to serve those of the superior Kshatriya and Brahman varnas.

The elite landowning classes, such as Rajputs and Bhumihars, now sought to present themselves as flagbearers of the ancient Hindu tradition. At the same time, there was a proliferation of Brahmanical rituals in the daily life of the elite, a greater stress on pure bloodlines, more stringent conditions placed on matrimonial alliances, and, as noted by some social reformers of the day, an increase among the Rajputs of female infanticide, a practice that had little history among the Kurmi.

The map of the prevailing "races" of India (now discredited) based on the 1901 Census of British India. The Kurmi are shown both in the United Provinces (UP) and the Central Provinces.

An "ethnographic" photograph from 1916 showing Kurmi farmers, both men and women, sowing a field

Another ethnographic print from 1916 showing a Kurmi family employing its beasts of burden to thresh wheat

A third print from the same collection showing the Kurmi family winnowing

The second half of the nineteenth century also largely overlapped with the coming of age of ethnology—interpreted then as the science of race—in the study of societies the world over. Although later to be discredited, the methods of this discipline were eagerly absorbed and adopted in British India, as were those of the emerging science of anthropology. Driven in part by the intellectual ferment of the discipline and in part by the political compulsions in both Britain and India, two dominant views of caste emerged among the administrator-scholars of the day. According to Susan Bayly:

Those like (Sir William) Hunter, as well as the key figures of H. H. Risley (1851–1911) and his protégé Edgar Thurston, who were disciples of the French race theorist Topinard and his European followers, subsumed discussions of caste into theories of biologically determined race essences, ... Their great rivals were the material or occupational theorists led by the ethnographer and folklorist William Crooke (1848–1923), author of one of the most widely read provincial Castes and Tribes surveys, and such other influential scholar-officials as Denzil Ibbetson and E. A. H. Blunt.

Seeing caste as a fundamental force in Indian life, Risley, especially, influenced official views as expressed in both the Censuses of British India and the Imperial Gazetteer brought out by Hunter. Risley is best known for the now discounted attribution of all differences in caste to varying proportions of seven racial types, which included "Dravidian," "Aryo-Dravidian," and "Indo-Aryan". The Kurmi fell into two such categories. In the ethnological map of India published in the 1909 Imperial Gazetteer of India and based on the 1901 Census supervised by Risley, the Kurmi of the United Provinces were classified as "Aryo-Dravidian," whereas the Kurmi of the Central Provinces were counted among "Dravidians". In the 1901 Census of India, the category of varna, the four-fold graded system, was included in the official classification of caste, the only time this was the case. (Note: Although influential, Risley's attempt did not achieve the end which he sought: people were unable to determine in which group they should classify themselves, the localised system he adopted could not be transposed onto the national stage, and some groups took advantage of the situation deliberately to seek reclassification and therefore satisfy their aspirations. L. I. and S. H. Rudolph have commented that "Risley's work, as a scientific effort, seemed based on mistaken premises. Varna was not a behavioral concept.") In the United Provinces (UP), the Kurmi were classified under "Class VIII: Castes from whom some of the twice-born would take water and pakki (food cooked with ghee), without question;" whereas, in Bihar, they were listed under: "Class III, Clean Sudra, Subclass (a)." (Note: Indian censuses of the British Raj period are not usually considered to be particularly reliable except for overall population figures. Those for some areas of the country could be more reliable than others.) According to William Pinch, "Risley's hierarchy (for United Provinces) was far more elaborate than that for Bihar, suggesting that contending claims of social respectability may have been more deeply entrenched in the western half of the Gangetic Plain."

In the writings of the occupational theorists, the Kurmis and the Jats came to be extolled for their yeoman-like purposefulness, tirelessness, and thrift, all of which, according to writers such as Crooke, Ibbetson, and Blunt, had been largely abandoned by the landed elite. Crooke wrote about the Kurmi in 1897:

They are about the most industrious and hard-working agricultural tribe in the Province. The industry of his wife has passed into a proverb:

Bhali jât Kurmin, khurpi hât,
Khet nirâwê apan pî kê sâth.

"A good lot is the Kurmi woman; she takes her spud and weeds the field with her lord."

According to Susan Bayly,

By the mid-nineteenth century, influential revenue specialists were reporting that they could tell the caste of a landed man by simply glancing at his crops. In the north, these observers claimed, a field of 'second-rate barley' would belong to a Rajput or Brahman who took pride in shunning the plough and secluding his womenfolk. Such a man was to be blamed for his own decline, fecklessly mortgaging and then selling off his lands to maintain his unproductive dependents. By the same logic, a flourishing field of wheat would belong to a non-twice-born tiller, wheat being a crop requiring skill and enterprise on the part of the cultivator. These, said such commentators as Denzil Ibbetson and E. A. H. Blunt, were the qualities of the non-patrician 'peasant' – the thrifty Jat or canny Kurmi in upper India, .... Similar virtues would be found among the smaller market-gardening populations, these being the people known as Keoris in Hindustan, ....

=== Twentieth century ===
As the economic pressures on the patrician landed groups continued through the remainder of the nineteenth century and into the early twentieth, there were increasing demands for unpaid labour directed at the Kurmi and other non-elite cultivators. The landed elites' demands were couched in avowals of their ancient rights as "twice-born" landowners and of the Kurmi's alleged lowly, even servile, status, which required them to serve. At times encouraged by sympathetic British officials and at other times carried by the groundswell of egalitarian sentiment being espoused then by the devotional Vaishnava movements, especially those based on Tulsidas's Ramcharitmanas, the Kurmi largely resisted these demands. Their resistance, however, did not take the form of denial of caste or of caste-based imposition, but rather of disagreement about where they stood in the caste ranking. A noteworthy attribute of the resulting Kurmi-kshatriya movement was the leadership provided by educated Kurmis who were now filling the lower and middle levels of government jobs. According to William Pinch:

The mantle of leadership in this phase befell the well-connected Ramdin Sinha, a government forester who had gained notoriety by resigning from his official post to protest a provincial circular of 1894 that included Kurmis as a "depressed community" and barred them therefore from recruitment into the police service. The governor’s office was flooded with letters from an outraged Kurmi-kshatriya public and was soon obliged to rescind the allegation in an 1896 communique to the police department "His Honor [the governor] is ... of the opinion that Kurmis constitute a respectable community which he would be reluctant to exclude from Government service."

The first Kurmi caste association had been formed in 1894 at Lucknow to protest against the police recruitment policy. This was followed by an organisation in Awadh that sought to draw other communities — such as the Patidars, Marathas, Kapus, Reddys and Naidus — under the umbrella of the Kurmi name. This body then campaigned for Kurmis to classify themselves as Kshatriya in the 1901 census and, in 1910, led to the formation of the All India Kurmi Kshatriya Mahasabha. Simultaneously, newly constituted farmers' unions, or Kisan Sabhas—composed of cultivators and pastoralists, many of whom were Kurmi, Ahir, and Yadav (Goala), and inspired by Hindu mendicants, such as Baba Ram Chandra and Swami Sahajanand Saraswati—denounced the Brahman and Rajput landlords as ineffective and their morality as false. In the rural Ganges valley of Bihar and Eastern United Provinces, the Bhakti cults of Rama, the incorruptible Kshatriya god-king of Hindu tradition, and Krishna, the divine cowherd of Gokul, had long been entrenched among the Kurmi and Ahir. The leaders of the Kisan Sabhas urged their Kurmi and Ahir followers to lay claim to the Kshatriya mantle. Promoting what was advertised as soldierly manliness, the Kisan Sabhas agitated for the entry of non-elite farmers into the British Indian army during World War I; they formed cow protection societies; they asked their members to wear the sacred thread of the twice-born, and, in contrast to the Kurmis own traditions, to sequester their women in the manner of Rajputs and Brahmins.

In 1930, the Kurmis of Bihar joined with the Yadav and Koeri agriculturalists to enter local elections. They lost badly, but in 1934 the three communities formed the Triveni Sangh political party, which allegedly had a million dues-paying members by 1936. However, the organisation was hobbled by competition from the Congress-backed Backward Class Federation, which was formed around the same time, and by co-option of community leaders by the Congress party. The Triveni Sangh suffered badly in the 1937 elections, although it did win in some areas. The organisation also suffered from caste rivalries, notably the superior organisational ability of the higher castes who opposed it, as well as the inability of the Yadavs to renounce their belief that they were natural leaders and that the Kurmi were somehow inferior. Similar problems beset a later planned caste union, the Raghav Samaj, with the Koeris.

Again in the 1970s, the India Kurmi Kshatriya Sabha attempted to bring the Koeris under their wing, but disunity troubled this alliance.

Many private caste-based armies surfaced in Bihar between the 1970s and 1990s, largely influenced by landlord farmers reacting to the growing influence of left extremist groups. Among these was the Bhumi Sena, the membership of which was drawn mainly from youths who had a Kurmi origin. Bhumi Sena was much feared in the Patna region and also had influence in the districts of Nalanda, Jehanabad and Gaya.

== Kurmis in Nepal ==
The Central Bureau of Statistics of Nepal classifies the Kurmi as a subgroup within the broader social group of Madheshi Other Caste. At the time of the 2011 Nepal census, 231,129 people (0.9% of the population of Nepal) were Kurmi. The frequency of Kurmis by province was as follows:

- Madhesh Province (2.8%)
- Lumbini Province (1.6%)
- Koshi Province (0.1%)
- Bagmati Province (0.0%)
- Gandaki Province (0.0%)
- Karnali Province (0.0%)
- Sudurpashchim Province (0.0%)

The frequency of Kurmis was higher than national average (0.9%) in the following districts:

- Parsa (8.4%)
- Kapilvastu (6.3%)
- Rautahat (5.7%)
- Bara (3.9%)
- Banke (2.2%)
- Sarlahi (2.2%)
- Rupandehi (2.0%)
- Parasi (1.7%)
- Dhanusha (1.3%)

== See also ==
- Kunbi
- Koeri
- Patidar
- Patel
- Kochaisa
- History of Backward Caste movement in Bihar
