= All India Kurmi Kshatriya Mahasabha =

Indian caste organisation

The All India Kurmi kshatriya Mahasabha (AIKKM) is an organisation that was established in 1910 to promote the interests of the Kurmi community.

== Origin ==
The Kurmi agriculturist community had a reputation as a hard-working caste by the authorities of the British Raj. They were at one time classified as a criminal tribe and had a reputation for being violent and ruthless in their attempts to dominate untouchable communities. Desiring recognition as a caste, the first Kurmi community association was formed in 1894 at Lucknow to protest against the recruitment policy that debarred them from entry to the police service. This was followed by an organisation in Awadh that sought to draw other communities such as the Patidars, Marathas, Kamma, Velama, Vokkaliga, Khandayat, Kamboj, under the umbrella of the Kurmi name. This body then campaigned for Kurmis to classify themselves as Kshatriya but there's no valid proof to support this statement in the 1901 census and, according to Christophe Jaffrelot, this led to the formation of the All India Kurmi Mahasabha in 1910. Other sources agree with this general history, which reflected a wider trend among Indian communities for social and political recognition, but consider the AIKKM to have formed in 1894.

In the 1940s and after, following the independence of India, the position of the AIKKM as a focal point for the community changed. In common with many other caste associations, it had been concerned primarily with resolving disputes among members of the community and with maintaining cohesion but a new breed of educated, youthful Kurmi activists sought a more politicised agenda. They appealed to the upwardly-mobile landowning members of the community to support their goal of recognition for Chhattisgarh as an independent state within the Republic of India. Some of these people, who included Purushottam Kaushik, formed organisations such as the Nau Yuvak Sangh (1946), while Khubchand Bagel was elected as head of the AIKKM in 1948 but, like Kaushik, was primarily interested the Chhattisgarh issue.

== See also ==
- Bhumi Sena
