= Akauna =

Akauna may refer to any of the following places in Bihar, India:

- Akauna, Patna, Bihar, a village in Masaurhi block
- Akauna, Nalanda, Bihar, a village in Ben block
- Akauna, Aurangabad, Bihar, a village in Goh block
- Akauna, Nawada, Bihar, a village in Sirdala block
- Akauna Minhai, Nawada, Bihar, a village in Nawada
