= Delhua =

Coordinates: 24°47′48″N 85°39′16″E

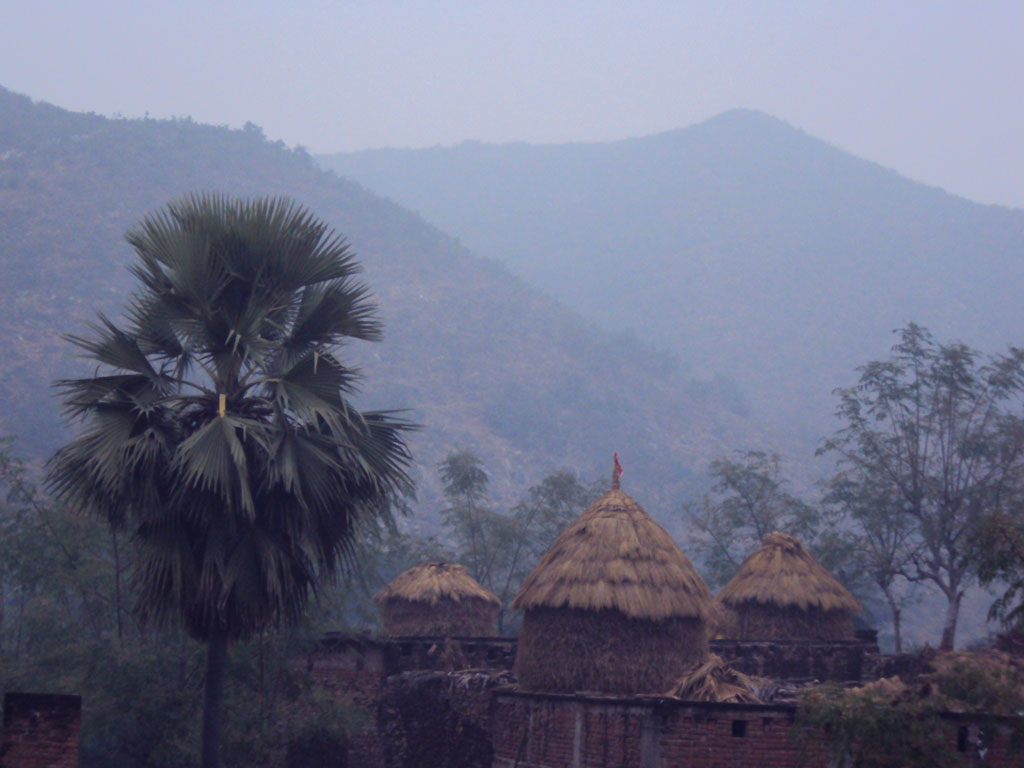
Delhua

Delhua is a village, situated about 20 kilometers away from Nawada city in Bihar state. It comes to Sarakanda Panchayat of Govindpur Block. The distance of this market from Govindpur is about 3 kilometres. On the one hand, there are long chains of Sakri river and mountains on the other. The population here is around 2000. The majority of the population here is dependent on agriculture. The soil here is very fertile. There is also the cultivation of vegetables and pulses along with rice and wheat. Here the fields are small, hence there is traditional farming. The main market of this village is Govindpur. People used this market for shopping and as well as selling. Nowadays, a big Haat (bazaar) taken place on every Tuesday at the other side of Sakri river and it is called Mangal Haat located on Katruchak mod. In this Haat, many farmers of Delhua sell vegetables and human needs.

== History ==
Things are the days when India had been liberated for almost 10 years, the celebration of independence was still in the hearts of people. Delhua's existence at that time was not the same. As it is believed, in the old times, any city or village, they were planted along the river so that enough needs could be completed by the river, in the same way, Delhua village was also situated along the Sakri river. There were 7 to 8 FUSH huts in the name of the village.

At that time the farm was the only way of life. Sakri river flows like this at the same time as it is flowing in the present. The soil on the banks of the Sakri river was also very fertile and there is still today, therefore at that time, there was also a food crop. Life was like this for quite a long time. That time it was like to get the food of just two hours at that time. Far far away desert and jungle were visible There was no village far and wide.

At that time the name of the city was just a Nawada where it was not easy to go. And also because why people need money to go to the cities and they did not have any, but if they needed more, then the people here used to walk on foot. It took two days to go from the village and come back.

Like the Sakri river, the river was the first rainy season. Rainfall was fixed every year in rain, but the people of the village had the advantage of both. In this flood, when the timber of the timber was flowing, they were collected and used for the entire year. The disadvantage was that the river also used to swallow the frogs and leave the venomous snake. It was like this coming every year.

The rainy night that year also had a flood in the Sakri river. The level of water had reached the maximum extent and now it had to be reduced as it was happening every year.

But this year the mood of the river seemed a bit revenge. The water level was rising instead of being low. The restlessness of the people of the village was increasing. But this time this river was not going to stop, the level of water was getting more and more. Now people in this village could not stop till late. Because the water had now also come into the houses. In a short time, the tragedy began to stir. The noise started to grow. The panic broke. Because it was only a little while in the village's sink, everything that could have been built in a bundle and started moving from there.

In about half an hour, all the crying stopped at the bottom of the Delhua hill and decided to spend the same night. Those who had left the food were fed to the children. All the people kept awake all night and kept on celebrating with God that our house is well protected. As soon as I was in the morning, the eyes of every one were in their homes, which had stopped showing now. All ran and ran to the place where there was the village of Dalhuya, all eyes were moist because all the houses were swept away in that fierce flood. There were only signs of being home. And in it, the poisonous snakes made their dwelling.

Now everything was finished. For a few days, all the villagers started living in the foothills of Delhua hill along with the memory of their abandoned village. But now everyone could not live in this way, there was some decision to decide whether the village of Dalhuya should be rehabilitated again where there was earlier or any other place and no safe place where river water could not reach. Most feedback was gone. Some people were in the favor that this village should be settled and some people, on the other hand, after a lot of tears, the decision was taken that the settlement of the village will not be right, then it will be destroyed in the same way next year.

Now where to find the place where Dalhuja was to be settled, some people were given the task of finding a new place. At that time there was a dangerous forest at Dehliya village. Ranging from lions to wild animals of all kinds. By the evening all the people who went to find the place came back and told that there is a flat area in the middle of a corridor on the other side of the bank, as an indicator there is an old Karam tree which is quite big. There are bushes of wild thorns, if we clean them, then we can build a house to live there.

There is also a facility of water, it seems that there is a pond in the middle of the forest and water will flow from it. There is danger of wild animals, but the waters of Sakri river will not come there.

The next morning all the people left for that place. Most of the people in that place did not see that because at that time the population was reduced due to lack of wood for the woods. After about 2 to 3 hours of masculine, removing the thorns, reaching the same karma tree. There was a thick forest all around.

While not delaying, people started clearing the nearby wild shrubs, now it was clear that all of them could make their own huts. Cutting the wood of woods, using tad and banana leaves, all the people broke up and made huts for their living. It was dark.

It was not easy for everyone to sleep at this new and dangerous place. Just like so many people have spent the night awaiting fear. From here the beginning of the new Delhua was started. The time passed and the place which was a stranger to everyone was now looking for itself. Slowly the surrounding forest became clean. Now the village of Delhua was already looking bigger and more beautiful. People come to meet the needs of their home and start sticks from dense forests. Delhua was developing from here.

There were quite a few people at that time in the village of Delhua, some hardworking, some intelligent and strong, one of those people was Mr. Chetu Ram Ji, who was also an independent freedom fighter as well. There was breath in their point of view. The people of the village who believed they were also believed. Their status was worthy of respect in the village. When the old Delhua ended in the flood of Sakri river and the new Delhua started, then at that time people had to eat – the main problem before the villagers.

Everything in the flood had dried up, there was nothing besides wild plum to eat. At that time it was Mr. Chetu Ram Ji, who had gone to Pedal Nawada district and after one day, from the order of the collector, took the grain on the bullock cart. Dehlua again stood up for the same grains and reached here today.

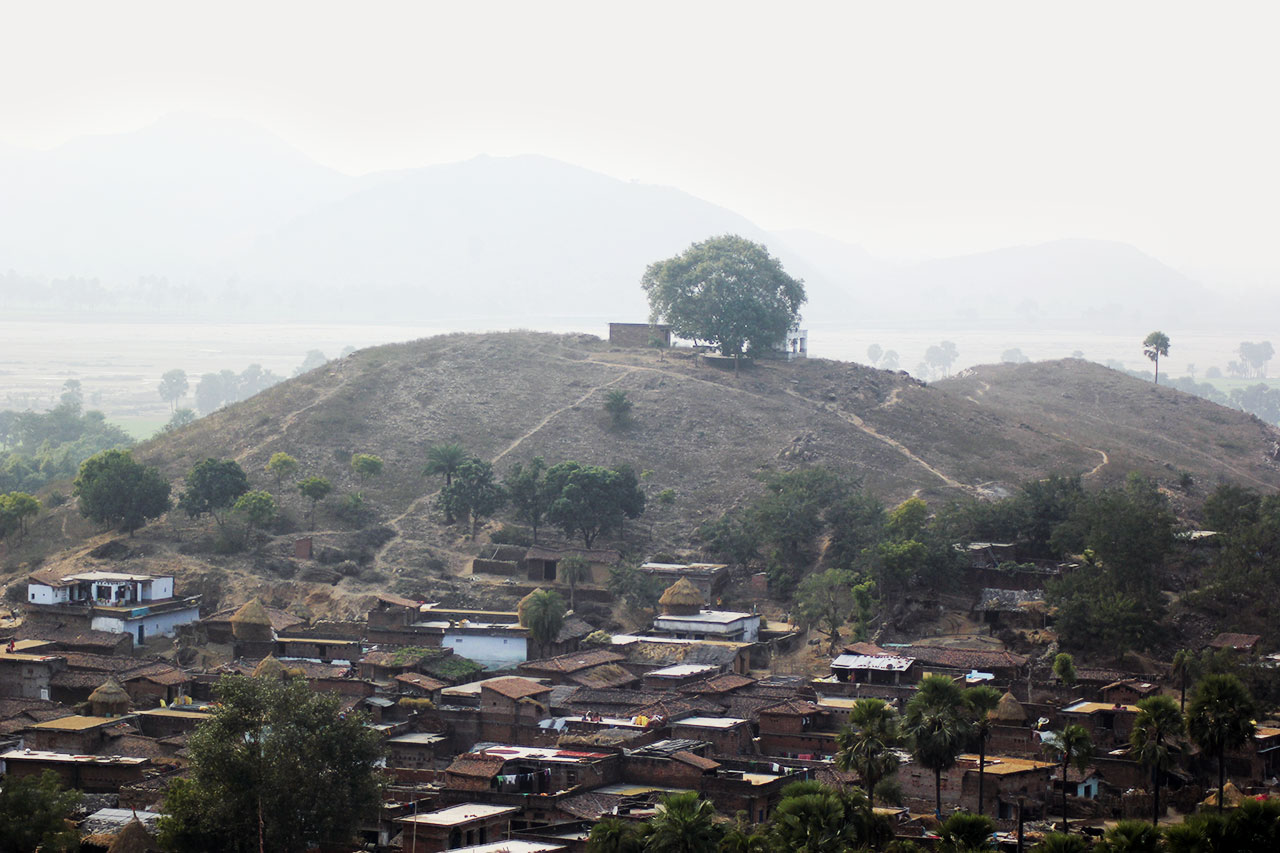
Delhua9

== Man-made features ==
There are four temples in this village: They are Hanuman mandir, Durga mandir and a famous Shiva mandir, situated on a hill named Murli Pahad. Every year on the occasion of Dussehra there is a mela.

== Climate and geography ==
Delhua features a typical version of the humid subtropical climate. Summers are long and extremely hot, from early April to mid-October, with the monsoon season in between. The months of March to May see a time of hot prickling heat. Monsoon arrives at the end of June, bringing some respite from the heat, but increasing humidity at the same time. The brief, mild winter starts in late November and peaks in January and is notorious for its heavy fog. Extreme temperatures range from −0.6 °C (30.9 °F) to 46.7 °C (116.1 °F).

The village has an average elevation of 80 meters (262 feet). The Sakri river flows nearby, and Kakolat Falls, a popular waterfall in Bihar is 15 kilometres (9.3 mi) away.

== Education ==
There is a secondary school in Delhua, which has approximately 300 students from the village studying. For the rest of the studies, go to Govindpur or Nawada

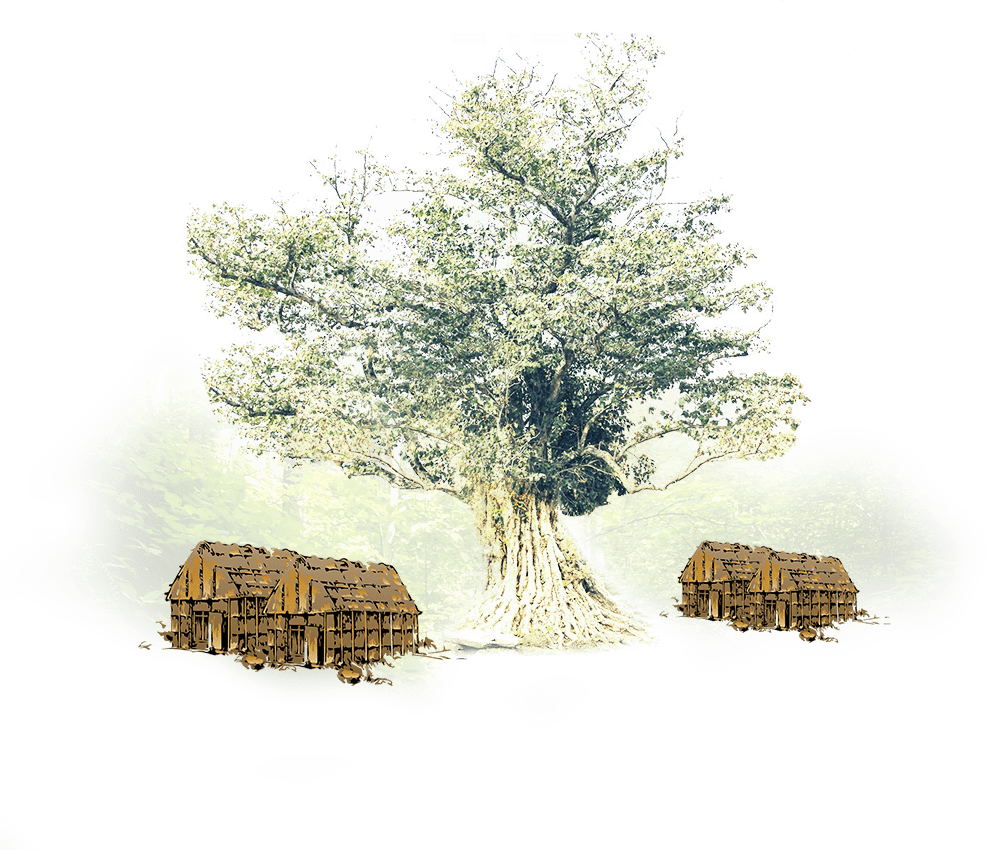
Delhua Old Pic

== Crops ==
Rice, wheat, corn, chickpeas, peanuts, and mustard are the village's main crops.

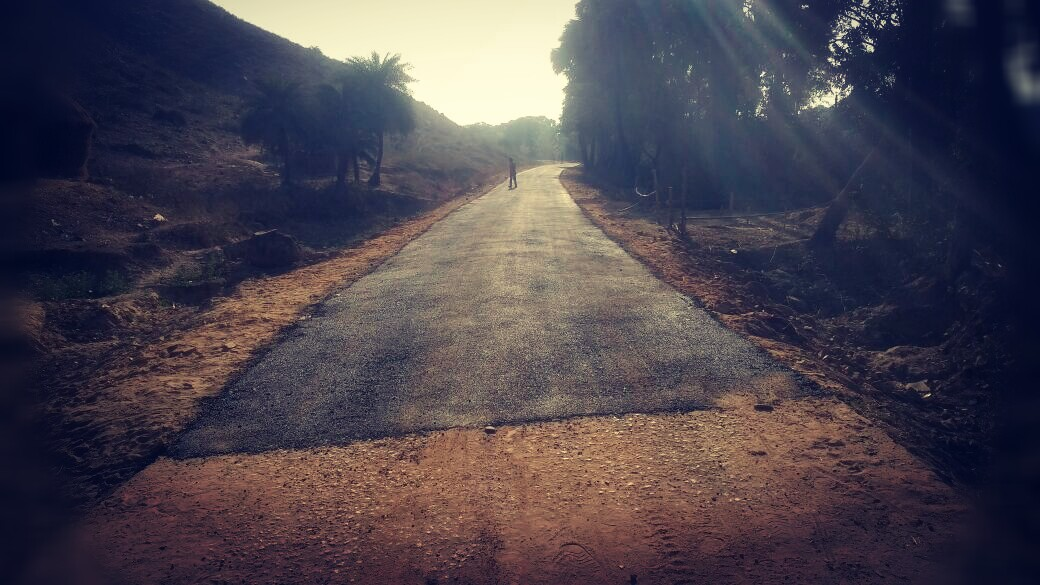
Delhua road
