= Sitamarhi, Nawada =

Sitamarhi Nawada
- सीतामढ़ी नवादा
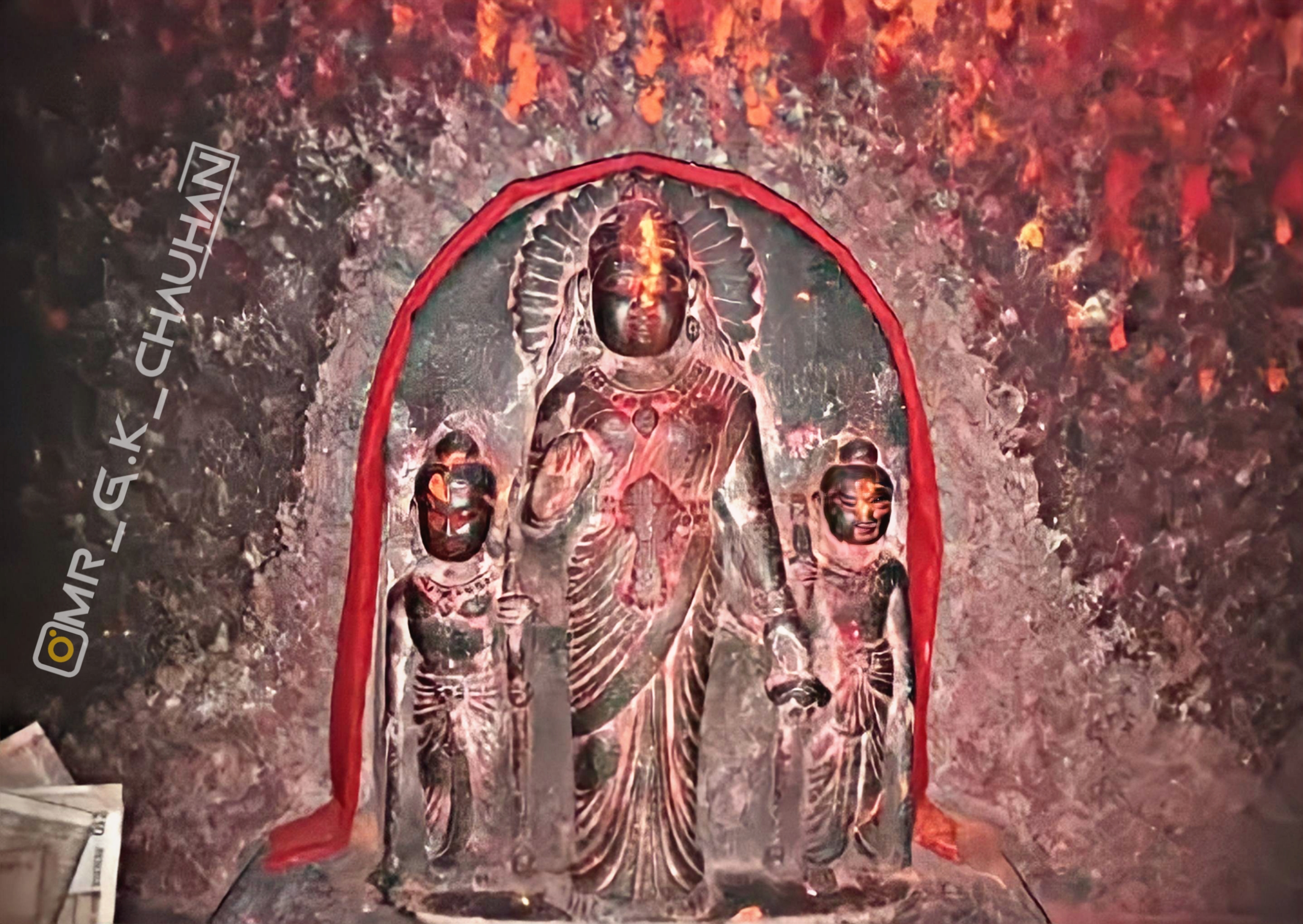

Religion
- Affiliation: Hinduism
- District: Nawada
- Deity: Maa Sita

Location
- Location: Sitamarhi Meskaur
- State: Bihar
- Country: India

Sitamarhi is a village located in the Meskaur block of Nawada district, Bihar, India. Unique village of Bihar- where every caste has its own separate temple.

== Temples ==
Each caste has a separate temple:

- Chauhan Thakurbari - Chauhan Nonia caste
- Kabir Math Temple - Ravidas caste
- Rajvanshi Thakurbari - Rajwar caste
- Jarasandh Temple - Chandravanshi Kahar caste,
- Balmiki Temple - Mahto Koeri caste
- Narhari Vishwakarma Temple - Sonar caste
- Shiv Temple - Chaudhary Pasi caste
- Yadav Thakurbari - Yadav Gwala caste
- Bhumihar Thakurbari - Bhumihar caste
- Shabari Temple Dashrath Manjhi Smriti - Manjhi Musahar caste
