= Dumrawan =

- Village
- Location in Bihar, India Dumrawan (India)
- Coordinates: 24.9337658°N 85.7002472°E
- Country: India
- State: Bihar
- Division: Magadh
- District: Nawada

Government
  - Type: Dumrawan Gram Panchayat

Population (2011)
  - Total: 5,159

Languages
  - Official: Magahi, Hindi
- Time zone: UTC+5:30 (IST)
- PIN: 805132
- ISO 3166 code: IN-BR

Dumrawan is a large village and a Gram Panchayat in Pakri barawan block of Nawada district in the state of Bihar, India.

== Demographics ==
As of 2011 India census, Dumrawan had a population of 5159. Males constituted 53% of the population and females 47%. Dumrawan had an average literacy rate of 59.94%, below than the state average of 61.80%; with 66.87% of the males and 52.08% of females literate 16.38% of the population was under 6 years of age. The total geographical area of village is 658 hectares.

== Administration ==
As per constitution of India and Panchyati Raaj Act, Dumrawan village is administrated by Mukhiya (Head of Village) who is elected representative of village. Dumrawan comes under Warisaliganj legislative constituency of state of Bihar and under the Nawada Lok Sabha constituency of India.

== Economy ==
In Dumrawan village out of total population, 1756 were engaged in work activities. 71.07% of workers describe their work as Main Work (Employment or Earning more than 6 Months) while 28.93% were involved in Marginal activity providing livelihood for less than 6 months. Of 1756 workers engaged in Main Work, 498 were cultivators (owner or co-owner) while 590 were Agricultural laborer. Agriculture is the main occupation, with the main crops being rice, wheat & pulses. However, the cultivation and growing of vegetables also offers substantial income to the residents. The Village has got Madhya Bihar Gramin Bank for all banking operations. Several people are also engaged in milk co-operative society Bihar State Milk Co-operative Federation for their livelihood.

== Transport ==
Dumrawan village lies on SH8 connecting Nawada and Jamui districts of Bihar. Local modes of transport are also available from the village for nearby markets like Pakri barawan, Baghi Bardiha and Kadirganj.
