= Chandinama =

Village in Nawada district, Bihar, India

Coordinates: 25°4′52.7″N 85°42′50.5″E

Chandinama or Chandi Nuwan is a village situated in Nawada district of the Indian state of Bihar.

== Geography ==
It is situated about 35 km north east of Nawada city and 18 km south west of Sheikhpura city. Neighboring villages include Khakri, Rebra, Daulachak and Nurichak.

== Culture ==
The core attraction of Chandinama is Chandi Maa temple. Every year people from neighbouring villages, such as visit it to worship the goddess Chandi. The religious venue is particularly used during Durga Puja, a Bengali festival. On this occasion the temple is decorated. Congregants are invited to sing along throughout the night by offering prayers to the goddess in front of fire. The festival is known for animal sacrifice made outside the temple after which people eat.
