= Nemdargunj =

Village in Bihar, India

Nemdarganj (pop. 5000) is a village in Nawada district about 7 km from the main town of Nawada. There are several schools operating under the Government of Bihar utkarmit madhya vidyalay Nemdarganj Nawada. The population consists of both Hindus and Muslims.

The ephemeral Khuri River divides the Nawada district.
