= Biju Bigha =

Gram panchayat in Bihar, India

Biju Bigha is a Gram Panchayat located in Meskaur Block of Nawada District, Bihar, India. It is situated on the bank of river Telaiya. It is a part of Rajauli Vidhansabha constituency. Merhkuri is one of the prominent village of this Gram Panchayat. Paddy, Wheats are major crop grown in this area. Village consist of all the major caste having maximum population of Kushwaha in the area but Brahmin are the super intellectual caste present in this Panchayat.
