= M.A. Rasul =

Indian politician

Mohammed Abdullah Rasul was an Indian politician. He belonged to the Communist Party of India (Marxist). M.A. Rasul was a prominent leader of the peasants' movement and served as minister in the West Bengal state government for a short period in the 1960s.

== Early political activity ==
Rasul hailed from Burdwan. Rasul was a leader of the peasant movement. Rasul was arrested during the 1959 Food Movement. In January 1936 he was one of the leaders, gathered in Meerut, that were tasked with convening the founding conference of the All India Kisan Sabha in Lucknow. As a political activist, Rasul was an associate of Muzaffar Ahmed. Around 1943 Rasul was sent to Chittagong, to make contact with the Communist Party of Burma, but his trip was suspended due to a boat accident.

== Independence, Partition and Tebhaga movement ==
Rasul was elected general secretary of the All India Kisan Sabha at its 10th conference held in Sikandra Rao in 1947. At the time the Kisan Sabha was facing government repression. He resigned from this post in the early 1950s, in order to facilitate merger talks with the All India United Kisan Sabha (a break-away group). In 1947, Rasul and a number of other Muslim party leaders were sent to East Pakistan to build the party there. Rasul's stay in Pakistan became short, however, and he soon returned to India. He was a leader of the Tebhaga movement.

== Legislator and Minister ==
Rasul was a member of the West Bengal Legislative Council. He was elected by the West Bengal Legislative Assembly. He was named Minister of Transport (leading the transport branch of the Home Department) in the second United Front government of West Bengal, formed in February 1969. Rasul resigned as Minister of Transport after the West Bengal Legislative Council was abolished. Mohammed Amin was sworn in as new Minister of Transport on 4 February 1970.

== Later years ==
The 26th conference of the All India Kisan Sabha (Ashoka Road) elected Rasul as vice-president.

Rasul died on 21 November 1991, at the age of 88.

== Bibliography ==
- Md. Abdullah Rasul (1974). A History of the All India Kisan Sabha. National Book Agency.
- Md. Abdullah Rasul (1980). Krshaka Sabhara itihasa. Nabajataka Prakasana.
- Md. Abdullah Rasul (1985). Grāme grāmāntare. Nyāśanāla Buka Ejensi.
