= Derhgaon, Nawada =

Village cluster of Nayadih, Derhgaon, and Bishwanathpur

Derhgaon
- Location in Nawada, Bihar, India Derhgaon (India)
- Coordinates: 25.09°N 85.75°E
- Country: India
- State: Bihar
- Region: Magadha
- District: Nawada

Government
  - Body: Khakhari Gram Panchayat
  - MLA: Aruna Devi
  - MP: Chandan Singh
  - Chief Minister: Nitish Kumar
- Elevation: 80 m (260 ft)

Population (2011)
  - Total: 6,140

Languages
  - Official: Hindi English
- Time zone: UTC+5:30 (IST)
- PIN: 805130

Derhgaon is a village in Kashi Chak Block, Nawada District, in Bihar, India. The local government includes Derhgaon proper and seven nearby villages.

== Demographics ==
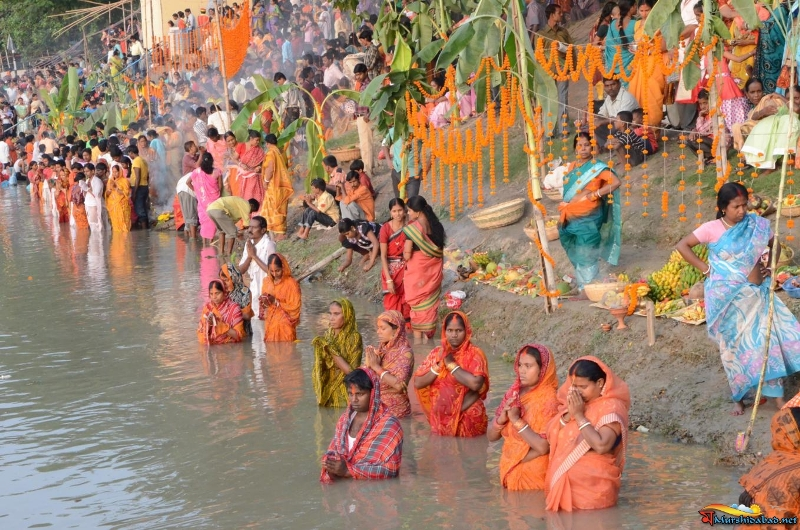
Chhath puja in Derhgaon

Derhgaon is a village located in Kashi Chak Block of Nawada district, Bihar with total 905 families residing. The Derhgaon village has population of 6140 of which 3245 are males while 2895 are females as per Population Census 2011.

In Derhgaon village population of children with age 0-6 is 1063 which makes up 17.31% of total population of village. Average Sex Ratio of Derhgaon village is 892 which is lower than Bihar state average of 918. Child Sex Ratio for the Derhgaon as per census is 915, lower than Bihar average of 935.

== Caste ==
Schedule Caste (SC) constitutes 19.46% while Schedule Tribe (ST) were 0.05% of total population in Derhgaon village.

The predominant religion in the region is Hinduism, while in Nayadih, the Chaurasia community are among the largest in the community. Derhgaon comes under Khakhari panchayat, where large population belongs to Bhumihar community. There is Kurmi (Mahato), Kushwaha community also in majority in population.

== Government ==
As per constitution of India and Panchyati Raaj Act, Derhgaon village is administrated by Mukhiya (Head of Village) who is elected representative of village. Nayadih comes under Warisaliganj legislative constituency of state of Bihar and It also comes under the Nawada Lok Sabha constituency.

1. Derhgaon
2. Nayadih
3. Bishwanathpur
4. Durgapur
5. Benipur
6. Raghunathpur
7. Sita Chak
8. Tarapur

== Economy ==
In Derhgaon village out of total population, 2214 were engaged in work activities. 76.20% of workers describe their work as Main Work (Employment or Earning more than 6 Months) while 23.80% were involved in Marginal activity providing livelihood for less than 6 months. Of 2214 workers engaged in Main Work, 796 were cultivators (owner or co-owner) while 741 were Agricultural labourer.

Agriculture is the main occupation, with the main crops being rice and wheat. However, the cultivation and growing of onion also offers substantial income to the residents.

== Transport ==
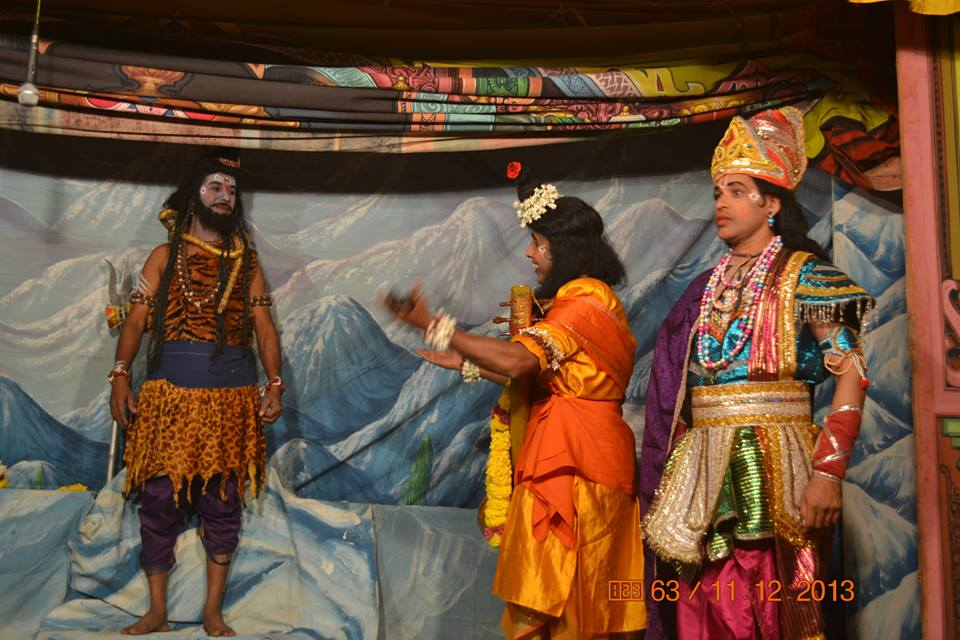
A scene of natak at occasion of Saraswati puja

Nayadih is accessible by rail, with a railway station derhgaon on the Gaya-Kiul section of the East Center Railway Zone of the Indian Railways. The predominant mode of public transportation to Derhgaon is the railway.

Rail Network

1. Patna Railway Station → Gaya Railway Station → Derhgaon or Patna Railway Station → Kiul railway station → Derhgaon

By Road

1. Patna → Nawada → Warisaliganj → Derhgaon

Nearby Airports

1. Gaya Airport 89 kilometres (55 mi)
2. Lok Nayak Jayaprakash Airport, Patna 113 kilometres (70 mi)
3. Birsa Munda Airport, Ranchi 244 kilometres (152 mi)
4. Netaji Subhas Chandra Bose International Airport, Kolkata 465 kilometres (289 mi)

== Education ==
Derhgaon village has higher literacy rate compared to Bihar. In 2011, literacy rate of Derhgaon village was 64.15% compared to 61.80% of Bihar. In Derhgaon Male literacy stands at 73.61% while female literacy rate was 53.50%.

== Festivals ==
1. Chhath Puja
2. Holi
3. Diwali
4. Durga puja
5. Ram navami
6. Raksha Bandhan
7. Saraswati Puja
