= Hisua Assembly constituency =

Constituency of the Bihar legislative assembly in India

Coordinates: 24.83°N 85.42°E

- Constituency No. 236 for the Bihar Legislative Assembly

Constituency details
- Country: India
- Region: East India
- State: Bihar
- District: Nawada
- Lok Sabha constituency: Nawada (Lok Sabha constituency)
- Established: 1957
- Reservation: None

Member of Legislative Assembly
- 18th Bihar Legislative Assembly
- Incumbent Anil Singh
- Party: BJP
- Alliance: NDA
- Elected year: 2025

Hisua is an Assembly constituency of the Legislative Assembly of Bihar covering the city of Hisua in the Nawada district of Bihar, India.

Hisua is one of six assembly constituencies in the Nawada (Lok Sabha constituency). Since 2008, this assembly constituency is numbered 236 amongst 243 constituencies.

Currently this seat is represented by Indian National Congress candidate Nitu Kumari, who won in last Assembly election of 2020 Bihar Legislative Assembly election by defeating Bharatiya Janta Party candidate Anil Singh by a margin of 17,091 votes.

== Geographical scope ==
The constituency comprises parts of below areas:

1. Akbarpur Block
2. Hisua Block
3. Narhat Block

== Members of the Legislative Assembly ==
| Year | Member | Party |
|---|---|---|
| 1957 | Raj Kumari Devi | Indian National Congress |
| 1962 | Raj Kumari Devi | Indian National Congress |
| 1967 | Shatrughan Sharan Singh | Indian National Congress |
| 1969 | Shatrughan Sharan Singh | Indian National Congress |
| 1972 | Shatrughan Sharan Singh | Indian National Congress |
| 1977 | Babu Lal Singh | Janata Party |
| 1980 | Aditya Singh | Independent politician |
| 1985 | Aditya Singh | Independent politician |
| 1990 | Aditya Singh | Indian National Congress |
| 1995 | Aditya Singh | Indian National Congress |
| 2000 | Aditya Singh | Independent politician |
| 2005 | Aditya Singh | Indian National Congress |
| 2005 | Anil Singh | Bharatiya Janata Party |
| 2010 | Anil Singh | Bharatiya Janata Party |
| 2015 | Anil Singh | Bharatiya Janata Party |
| 2020 | Nitu Singh | Indian National Congress |
| 2025 | Anil Singh | Bharatiya Janata Party |

== Election results ==
=== 2025 ===
Detailed Results at: https://results.eci.gov.in/ResultAcGenNov2025/ConstituencywiseS04236.htm

2025 Bihar Legislative Assembly election: Hisua
| Party | Candidate | Votes | % | ±% |
|---|---|---|---|---|
| BJP | Anil Singh | 95,885 | 44.4 | +3.56 |
| INC | Nitu Kumari | 68,036 | 31.51 | −18.3 |
| Independent | Dharmendra Kumar | 27,871 | 12.91 | |
| JSP | Sury Dev Prasad | 5,063 | 2.34 | |
| Independent | Sunil Kumar Nirala | 3,870 | 1.79 | |
| NOTA | None of the above | 4,941 | 2.29 | +0.02 |
| Majority | | 27,849 | 12.89 | +3.92 |
| Turnout | | 215,945 | 58.6 | +8.15 |
| BJP gain from INC | | Swing | | |

=== 2020 ===
2020 Bihar Legislative Assembly election: Hisua
| Party | Candidate | Votes | % | ±% |
|---|---|---|---|---|
| INC | Nitu Kumari | 94,930 | 49.81 | |
| BJP | Anil Singh | 77,839 | 40.84 | −3.94 |
| BSP | Uttam Kumar Chaudhary | 3,696 | 1.94 | +1.37 |
| Independent | Azad Geeta Prasad Sharma | 3,281 | 1.72 | |
| Rashtriya Jan Jan Party | Anil Kumar Sharma | 2,890 | 1.52 | |
| NOTA | None of the above | 4,322 | 2.27 | −0.46 |
| Majority | | 17,091 | 8.97 | +2.32 |
| Turnout | | 190,600 | 50.45 | −3.33 |
| INC gain from BJP | | Swing | | |

=== 2015 ===
2015 Bihar Legislative Assembly election: Hisua
| Party | Candidate | Votes | % | ±% |
|---|---|---|---|---|
| BJP | Anil Singh | 82,493 | 44.78 | |
| JD(U) | Kaushal Yadav | 70,254 | 38.13 | |
| SP | Nitu Kumari | 14,188 | 7.7 | |
| CPI(M) | Naresh Chandra Sharma | 4,902 | 2.66 | |
| Independent | Ramsawrup Yadav | 3,136 | 1.7 | |
| NOTA | None of the above | 5,029 | 2.73 | |
| Majority | | 12,239 | 6.65 | |
| Turnout | | 184,238 | 53.78 | |
