= Merhkuri =

Village in Bihar, India

- Village
- Interactive map of Merhkuri
- Coordinates: 24°44′25″N 85°23′14″E
- Country: India
- State: Bihar
- District: Nawada
- Block: Meskaur

Government
  - Type: Gram Panchayat
- Postal code: 805122

Merhkuri is a village located in Biju Bigha Gram Panchayat in Meskaur in district Nawada. It is located on the bank of river Telaiya.
