= All India United Kisan Sabha =

Political party in India

The All India United Kisan Sabha was a peasants organization in India. The AIUKS was founded around the late 1940s by Swami Sahajanand Saraswati. Sahajanand had broken away from the All India Kisan Sabha in 1945, being opposed to the increasing communist domination of the movement. To form the new AIUKS, Sahajanand gathered Congress Socialist Party members and other Indian National Congress left-wing elements.

AIUKS had similar demands as the All India Kisan Sabha. The organisation demanded comprehensive agrarian reform, redistribution of lands to poor peasants and the nationalization of waterways, lands and 'all sources of energy and wealth'. It sought to abolish landlordism and curb the power of moneylenders. Jadunandan Sharma was the general secretary of AIUKS.

AIUKS had a few strongholds in Uttar Pradesh and Bihar, but was a marginal force in other parts of India. AIUKS was closely linked to the Congress Party in Bihar, but the party didn't follow the AIUKS space to develop further. Sahajanand died soon after the foundation of AIUKS, which weakened the movement.

AIUKS fielded two candidates in the 1951-1952 Lok Sabha parliamentary election; Shiva Prasad Sinha contested a seat in Gaya East, obtaining 37,351 votes (8.98%) and Chandradeo Sharma contested the Gaya North seat, obtaining 22,903 votes (17.93%). The organization fielded 20 candidates in the 1952 Bihar Legislative Assembly election. Together they obtained 78,695 votes (0.82% of the votes in the state, an average of 11.05% in the seats they contested). AIUKS was the second-most voted party in four constituencies; the Patna City West cum Naubatpur (two seat constituency), Pakribarawan cum Warisaliganj (two seat constituency, AIUKS had Januandan Sharma as one of its candidates), Rajauli cum Wazirganj (two seat constituency, AIUKS fielded only one candidate) and Sahibganj (one seat constituency, AIUKS candidate obtained 32.70% of the vote). The Election Commission of India recognized AIUKS as a state party in Bihar.
