= Nitu Kumari =

Indian politician

Member of Bihar Legislative Assembly
- In office November 2020 – 2025
- Preceded by: Anil Singh
- Succeeded by: Anil Singh
- Constituency: Hisua

Chairperson, District Councils of India
- In office July 2006 – May 2011
- District: Nawada District

Personal details
- Born: 6 January 1981 (age 45) Sher,Gopalganj, Bihar (India
- Party: Indian National Congress
- Spouse: Shekhar Singh Alias Pappu Singh
- Parent: Madan Mohan Rai (Father)
- Nickname: Nitu Devi

Nitu Kumari also known as Nitu Singh is a member of Indian National Congress and elected representative of Hisua.
