= Sitamarhi Mandir =

Temple in Bihar

Sitamarhi Mandir is a Hindu template situated in Nawada district of Bihar. It is known as one of oldest temple in Nawada and it is believed that the son of Ramchandra Luv and Kush was born at Sitamarhi.
