= Rajauli Wildlife Sanctuary =

Protected area in Tamil Nadu, India

- IUCN category IV (habitat/species management area)
- Location within Bihar Location within India
- Interactive map of Rajauli Wildlife Sanctuary
- Location: Nawada district, Bihar, India
- Coordinates: 24°37′00″N 85°33′24″E
- Area: 27.27 km^{2} (10.53 sq mi)
- Established: 2019
- Governing body: Ministry of Environment and Forests, Government of India

Rajauli Wildlife Sanctuary is a protected area in Nawada district in the Indian state of Bihar. Established in 2019, it is spread across an area of 27.27 km^{2} (10.53 sq mi).

== Geography ==
Rajauli wildlife sanctuary is located in Nawada district in the Indian state of Bihar. Established in 2010, it is spread across an area of 27.27 km^{2} (10.53 sq mi). It was part of the larger Koderma Wildlife Sanctuary before the bifurication of the state of Jharkhand from Bihar. It is now contiguous with the Koderma Wildlife Sanctuary located across the Bihar-Jharkhand border.

== Flora and fauna ==
The fauna found in the sanctuary include mammals such as chital, sambar, sloth bear, other birds, and reptiles.

== See also ==
- List of wildlife sanctuaries of India
