= Anil Singh (politician) =

Indian politician

Member of Bihar Legislative Assembly
- Incumbent
- Assumed office 2025
- Preceded by: Nitu Kumari
- Constituency: Hisua
- In office 2005–2020
- Preceded by: Aditya Singh
- Succeeded by: Nitu Kumari
- Constituency: Hisua

Personal details
- Born: 11 November 1968 (age 57) Nawada, Bihar
- Political party: Bharatiya Janata Party
- Spouse: Ragini Devi
- Children: 1 son, 1 daughter
- Parent: Ramsharan Singh (father)
- Education: Bachelor of Arts

Anil Singh is an Indian politician and member of 14th, 15th and 16th Legislative Assembly of Bihar. He represented the Hisua (Vidhan Sabha constituency) in Nawada district of Bihar. He is a member of Bhartiya Janta Party and a social activist.

== Early life and education ==
Anil Singh was born on 11 November 1967 in Fulma village in Nawada district. He completed his schooling from Bareb High school, then pursued his college studies in political science (BA) from Shri Krishna memorial college, Magadh University.

== Political career ==
Anil Singh has won the Bihar Legislative Assembly elections three consecutive times in 2005, 2010 and 2015. He is also the core committee member of Bihar Bhartiya Janta Party. He also holds the post of whip for his party in the State Legislative Assembly. He is also the leader of Bharatiya Janata Yuva Morcha in Bihar, which is the youth wing of BJP in the state. He has also been one of the proposers of Ram Nath Kovind for the Indian Presidential election in 2017 for Bhartiya Janta Party.

== Posts held ==
| # | From | To | Position | Comments |
|---|---|---|---|---|
| 01 | 2005 | 2010 | Member, 2005 Bihar Legislative Assembly election | |
| 02 | 2010 | 2015 | Member, 2010 Bihar Legislative Assembly election | |
| 03 | 2015 | 2020 | Member, 2015 Bihar Legislative Assembly election | |
