= Ganesh Shankar Vidyarthi (politician) =

Indian independence activist and politician (1924–2021)

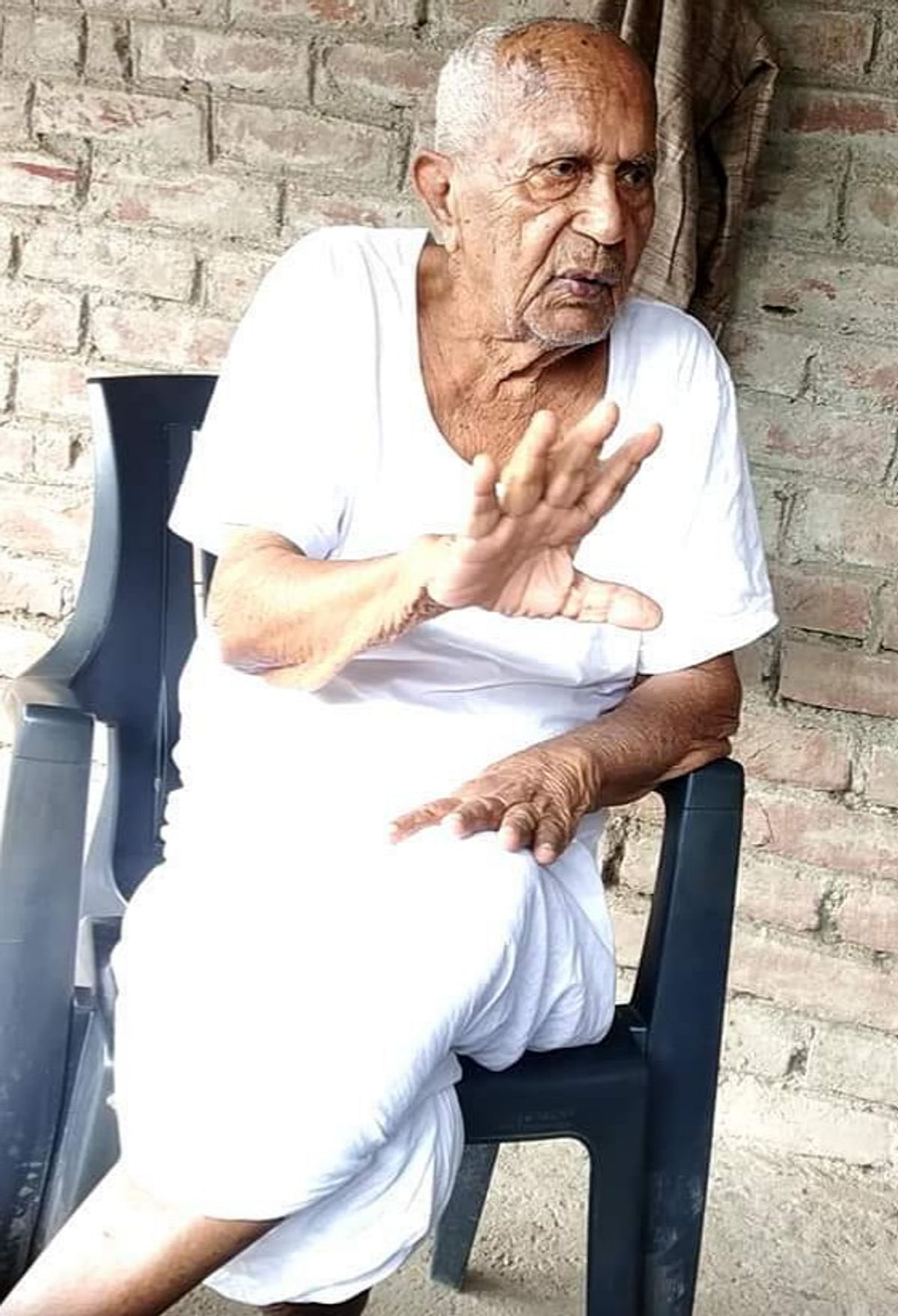
- Vidyarthi during an interview
- Born: September 1, 1924; Rajauli, Nawada, Bihar
- Died: January 11, 2021 (aged 96); Ruben Memorial Hospital, Patna, Bihar
- Occupation: Politician

Ganesh Shankar Vidyarthi (1 September 1924 – 11 January 2021) was an Indian independence activist and politician from Nawada district in the state of Bihar. He was elected to the Bihar Legislative Assembly for two terms and he was a Member of the Bihar Legislative Council for one term. He joined the Communist Party in 1942 and went on to become the State Secretary of the Communist Party of India (Marxist) as well as a member of its national Central Committee. He went to jail multiple times for a total of six years both before Independence and after due to his political participation. He was fondly called Ganeshda.

== Life ==
Ganesh Shankar Vidyarthi was born in a large zamindar (landowner and farming) family in Rajauli, Nawada district, on 1 September 1924. When he was 12 years old, along with some others, he climbed a government building in Nawada and hoisted the tricolour for which he was arrested.

When Vidyarthi was 17 he joined the freedom movement. He became an established student leader raising student issues and holding strikes. In 1942, he joined the (undivided) Communist Party, even though some members in his family were in the Congress. In that very year, following the Quit India Movement, he was imprisoned for a year. He would go on to be jailed in 1944, 1946 and 1948. In 1948, the Communist Party was banned. While the CPI was not declared illegal on a national level, under Nehru multiple states took local measures. In late March and early April, the party was declared illegal and Patna was one of the locations from which the police arrested multiple leaders. Vidyarthi was in jail for three years during this time, only to be released in 1951.

In 1952, Vidyarthi contested the first assembly elections in the state from Rajauli. Vidyarthi, recalling those decades in a 2015 Times of India interview, said that most candidates would campaign by walking with a loudspeaker or mount it onto a bicycle, while richer candidates would travel on bullock carts and the star campaigners would travel by car. Vidyarthi was also outspoken about the changes in the election campaigning process, "the voters used to donate money, grain and vegetables to run the campaign... Now candidates give money to voters."

In the 1957 assembly election he secured the third highest number of votes from Rajauli, that is 4973 votes or 23.42% of the total votes polled. In the 1962 Bihar election he was the runner up from Rajauli. In the 1967 Bihar election he stood from Nawada and came third with 14602 votes or 27.22% of the vote share. In 1969 he was the runner up in Nawada. The 1960s were also the period when the Communist Party of India split due to internal ideological differences. Vidyarthi decided to go with the CPI(M). He would go on to become the State Secretary of the CPI(M) and a member of its national Central Committee (which elect the members for the Politburo). In the 1960s he would be jailed again for his political affiliation.

In 1977 and 1985 he won elections to the assembly standing from the Nawada seat. He was a member of Bihar Legislative Council from 1990 to 1996.

His involvement with politics continued till he was a nonagenarian. In 2017, he along with comrades welcomed the Kisan Mukti Yatra (Farmer Freedom Journey) to Nawada district at the Bihar Jharkhand border with red flags. His speech was recorded in a diary entry:

He said that when the farmer rises up, thrones topple. He remembered the historic farmers' conference at Gaya under the leadership of Swami Sahajananda Saraswati during which there was a lot of discussion on the red flag. Acharya Narendra Dev had objected to keeping the Kisan Sabha's red flag, whereas Swami Sahajananda Saraswati and Jaiprakash Narayan had been in favour of it. Com Ganesh Shankar reminded the people that while addressing the delegates Swami Sahajananda had said that the red flag is not made merely of the colour red; this flag is coloured with the blood, sweat, and sacrifices of farmers and workers. Finally the delegates had agreed that the red flag of the Kisan Sabha should be retained. [...] The recollections of Com Ganesh Shankar Vidyarthi were touching and inspiring for comrades of our generation present there as well as for future generations.

— Excerpts from All India Kisan Mahasabha (AIKM) leader Purushottam Sharma's diary of the Bihar leg of the Kisan Mukti Yatra, 2017

== Death ==
Sometime after testing positive for COVID-19 during the COVID-19 pandemic in India, he died on 11 January 2021. Bihar Chief Minister Nitish Kumar paid his respects during a visit to Rajauli on 21 January.
