= Sankat Mochan Mandir Nawada =

Temple in Nawada, Bihar, India

Religion
- Affiliation: Hinduism
- Deity: Hanuman

Location
- Location: Nawada, Nawada district
- State: Bihar
- Country: India

Sankat Mochan Mandir is a Hindu temple in Nawada, Bihar, India. The temple is dedicated to Hanuman, and attracts thousands of devotees each day.
