= Nardiganj =

Coordinates: 24.933333°N 85.433333°E

Hisua is one of the 14 blocks of Nawada district, in the state of Bihar, India. It comprises 54 villages, including the eponymous Nardiganj village. As per 2011 Census of India, Nadirganj block has a population of 124,716 while the Nardiganj village has population of 7150 of which 3723 are males while 3427 are females.

== Location ==
Nardiganj located on latitude of 24.9361435N and Longitude of 85.422678E. This place is situated in Nawada, Bihar, India, its geographical coordinates are 24° 56' 0" North, 85° 26' 0" East and its original name (with diacritics) is Nārdiganj . It takes 28 minutes to travel from Nardiganj Road to Rajgir. Approximate driving distance between Nardiganj Road and Rajgir is 10 km. 12 km far from district headquarter.

== History ==
Nardiganj is situated in the Magadh subdivision of southern Bihar. The Surya Narayana Mandir of Handiya (Nawada) is earliest and it is supposed to be of Dvapara Yuga. The Surya Narayana Mandir of Handiya is constructed by the King of Magadha Jarasandha. Jarasandha's daughter Dhaniya was suffering from leprosy and used to stay this holy place every day for devotion. The myth goes, she used to bathe in the nearby pond and was cured. Soon after Dhaniya established a place of worship of Ma Bhagwati in a close to village and a Shivalinga at Dhaniya hill, which is just away from main temple. in the British age, Bhumihar jamindaar had ruled here. but after getting freedom jamindaar were started moving from here and sold 90% land to villagers. the Shiv Mandir and Hanuman Mandir of Nardiganj were built by villagers of nearby villages.

== Temple ==
There are many famous temples in Nardiganj. There is a Durgasthan, one Kali Sthan, one Badi devi sthan. And also Hanuman Mandir on main road. These Mandir were built by a people of nearby villages of Nardiganj. Kali sthan was founded by Sri Babu Prabhu chand in the 18th century in Bich bazar nardiganj he also the founder of old devi sthan. There is also a famous shiv mandir and a Surya mandir in nearby village, Ramey. This village has also a Devi sthan where every year Yag of 9 days is held.

== Economy ==
At the southern of Rajgir Nardiganj has been growing into an important business place. Magahi Pan is famous to all over India. handiya, Tungi villages are mainly known for Magahi pan. Sabji-bazaar, bich-bazaar, Andarbazar are centre point of markets in nardiganj. Bhumihars(babhans), Yadavas, teli, Mahuri, pandit, Ansari (julaha) are big communities there. Nardiganj is the main market place for most of the small villages around like Ramey, Handiya, Pandapa, Masaurha, Bikoo, Chirraiyan, Parariya. economy is mostly based on agriculture and small businesses
