= Khalkhu =

Coordinates: 24°42′N 85°24′E

- Village
- Interactive map of Khalkhu
- Country: India
- State: Bihar
- district: Nawada
- block: Sirdala

Population (2011)
  - Total: 709

Khalkhu is a village in the Sirdala Block, in a rural part of the Nawada district in Bihar, India.

As per the government register, the village code of Khalkhu is 258275. The village has 127 families.

== Population ==
According to the 2011 census, Khalkhu's population is 709. Out of this, 375 are males and 334 females. This village has 132 children aged 0–6 years. Among them, 76 are boys and 56 are girls.

== Literacy ==
The literacy rate in Khalkhu village is 35%, with 255 out of total 709 population being literate. In the male population, the literacy rate is 42%, with 159 males out of the total 375 being counted as literate. The female literacy rate is 28%, with 96 out of the total 334 women recorded as having been taught how to read.

The illiteracy rate of Khalkhu village is 64%. Here, 454 out of total 709 individuals are illiterate. The male illiteracy rate in the village is 57%, with 216 males out of total 375 are illiterate. Among the female population, the illiteracy rate is 71%, with 238 out of total 334 females being counted as illiterate within the village.

== Agricultural ==
The number of employed persons within Khalkhu village is counted as 340 with 369 being unemployed. Out of the 340 employed people, 14 persons are entirely reliant on cultivation.
