= Kakolat Falls =

Kakolat ककोलत
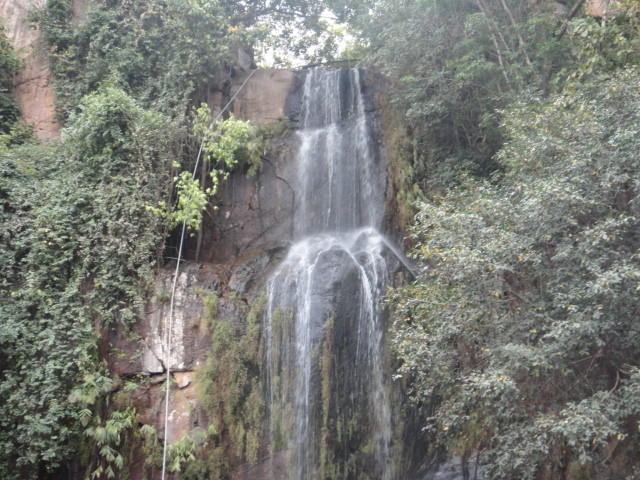
- Kakolat Falls

- Location within Bihar Location within India
- Location: Kakolat, Nawada district, Bihar, India
- Coordinates: 24°41′59″N 85°37′42″E
- Type: Cataract, segmented
- Elevation: 160 feet (50 m)
- Total height: 150 feet (46 m)
- Number of drops: 1
- Longest drop: 17,000 feet (5,200 m)

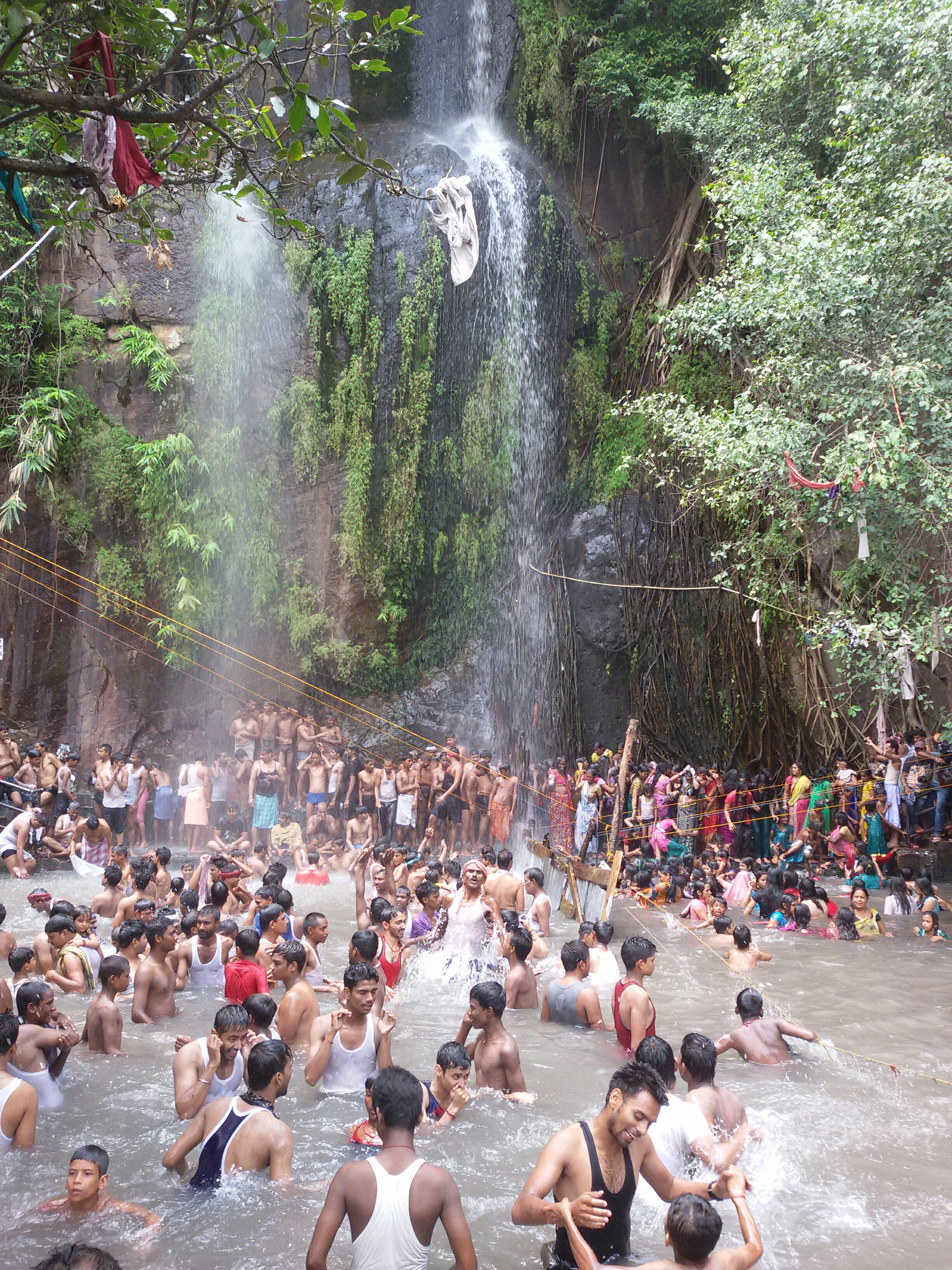
Tourists at the falls in the summer season

Kakolat (Hindi: ककोलत जलप्रपात; Urdu: کاکولات جھرنا۔) is a waterfall in the Nawada district of Bihar, India.

== Overview ==
Kakolat Waterfall, located in Nawada district, is situated amidst the hills of Ektara in the Govindpur block. The waterfall cascades step by step from a height of approximately 160 feet, into the Lohabar River, which flows through the Hazaribagh mountain range. The waterfall has its greatest flow after the monsoon season.

Kakolat is situated on the southern border of Bihar, 33 km from Nawada and 4 km from Thali Bazar. Kakolat waterfall cascades approximately 160 feet (49 m) and creates a natural reservoir at its base. It is located near Thali police station and is surrounded by forests.

On May 27, 2022, during his visit to Kakolat, Chief Minister of Bihar, Shri Nitish Kumar, directed the initiation of development works for eco-tourism at the site. Previously, tourism at this location was disorganized, often leading to unfortunate incidents. Considering these inconveniences faced by tourists, a development project for Kakolat Waterfall was prepared. The Kakolat Waterfall project was carried out in two phases.

Phase 1 of the project includes the construction of a pool, renovation of the water pool area, rock stabilization works, and the development of basic facilities such as changing rooms, toilets, gazebos, a viewpoint area, a water treatment plant, parking facilities, a cloakroom, electrification, construction of a natural stone pool in the lower part of the waterfall for children and the elderly, an administrative block, staff dormitory, forest rest house, and other protective structures.

Phase 2 includes the reinforcement of stairs, installation of railings, development of a children's park, construction of 60 shops in the vending zone, wooden bridges, fencing work, a security wall, and other related works.

On August 3, 2024, Kakolat Waterfall was inaugurated by Shri Nitish Kumar, the Honorable Chief Minister of Bihar, and was opened to visitors.

== In Indian mythology ==
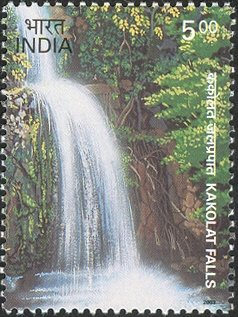
Stamp of India 2003 Waterfalls of India, Kakolat Falls

In Indian mythology, in Treta Yuga, a king was cursed by a Hindu sage (spiritualist) to become a python and live at the Kakolat Falls. The Pandavas visited the waterfall during their exile, and in doing so, liberated the king from his curse. The grateful king then proclaimed that anyone who bathed in the waterfall would be spared from being reborn as a snake. As a result, devotees began to bathe in Kakolat to escape such a fate.

Another version of the mythology mentions the king being cursed to become a dragon instead of a snake, and he used Kakolat as his abode. During their visit, the Pandavas liberated him from this curse.

According to regional folklore, Lord Krishna used to bathe in these waterfalls with his queens.

== See also ==
- List of waterfalls
- List of waterfalls in India
