= Kumbhi =

Village in Bihar, India

- Village
- Location within India
- Coordinates: 24.9895096°N 85.5542487°E
- Country: India
- State: Bihar
- District: Nawada
- Sub District: Warisaliganj
- Time zone: IST

Kumbhi is a rich village in agriculture in Warisaliganj Block, Nawada district, Bihar, India. It is located 15 km from Nawada and 3 km from National Highway 31. This village is surrounded by four side roads and situated in Barnawan Panchayat. Its economy is based on agriculture and Other sectors as well. Farmers there are relatively rich because they use the latest machinery in agriculture. It leads to the smartest village.

Kumbhi is also known for Durga Puja. Each year many people assembles here for the purpose of Durga Puja. The Durga Puja of kumbhi symbolises the unity of the people.
