= Govindpur, Bihar =

Village in Bihar, India

Coordinates: 24°47′51″N 85°39′16″E

Govindpur (also spelled Gobindpur) is a village and block headquarters in the Nawada district of Bihar, India. Located on the Sakri river, it is about 22 kilometers east of Nawada.

In 2005, the panchayat of Govindpur elected Pranita Gupta as the village's first sarpanch.

== Etymology ==
The name Govindpur is inspired by the name Govind (meaning Krishna).

In this block, Vishunpur village is the largest village in both area and population. It is surrounded by mountains that are the sources of many springs. Adjacent to this reservoir, there is a temple at the top of the mountain.

In this block, Dera village is the smallest village in both area and population. Dera comes under Madhopur panchayat. Earlier the village was called "Pirbigha", but it eventually became known as "Dera". Dera is surrounded by mountains from all sides. People who live here are mainly dependent on farming and government services.

The village-like Sarkanda is situated on the border of Bihar and Jharkhand. On the other side of the border is the village Kaniken. There is a high school, a post office, and a primary school.

The population is about 3,000 with many castes represented, including Yadav, Koiri, Pandit, Thathera, Sonar, Rajbanshi, Muslims, Bhumihar, Dusadh, Teli, Mushar, Mochi, Carpenter, Kahar, and Dhobi people. The land is fertile. Most of the population works in farming, while others work for the government.

There are two sub-inspectors of the Bihar Police in this village. There are enough teachers in higher secondary school and middle school for classes to run regularly.

== Sakri River ==
The Sakri River floods during the rainy season.

Delhua is a part of the Govindpur block. Govindpur is the main market in this village. It is 3 km from Delhua and it is situated on the other side of the Sakri River. Throughout most of the year villagers go there for marketing. But in the rainy season, they face a lot of problems because in the rainy season the river is too high to cross. This results in the post office and police station being completely disconnected from the village.

This village is also affected by Naxalites. In the rainy season, there is a higher level of Naxalite activity because the police cannot reach the village. There is also a dam 1 km from a village near the Pipra village.

== Geography ==
Govindpur has an average elevation of 80 metres (262 feet).

Kakolat Fall is a waterfall 8 km away from Govindpur.

== Crops ==
Dhan, gehun, maka, chana, mungfali, gana, masoor and sarson are the main crops grown in Govindpur.

== Religion ==
Govindpur contains four Hindu temples: Hanuman Mandir, Gayatri Mandir, Durga Mandir, Madaf, and a shiv mandir. Every year during Dussehra, a fair is held.

== Muril Pahad Forest ==
The Muril Pahad Forest contains several types of snake: krait, gehuan, dhaman and harhor.
