= Akbarpur (community development block) =

- Location in Bihar, India
- Coordinates: 24.88°N 85.53°E
- Country: India
- State: Bihar
- Region: Magadha
- District: Nawada
- Panchayat: 20
- Villages: 157

Government
  - Type: Community development block
- Elevation: 80 m (260 ft)

Population (2011)
  - Total: 237,292

Languages
  - Official: Hindi, English, Urdu
- Time zone: UTC+5:30 (IST)
- PIN: 805126
- Telephone code: 06324
- ISO 3166 code: IN-BR
- Vehicle registration: BR-27
- Sex ratio: 1.14 ♂/♀
- Website: Official website

Akbarpur is a community development block in the Nawada district of Bihar, India. The community block is headquartered in the village of the same name, which lies on the banks of the Khuri River. As of the 2011 Census, it was the most populated block in Nawada district.
