= Akauna, Patna =

Akauna
- Village
- Location in India
- Coordinates: 25°10′45″N 84°49′36″E
- Country: India
- State: Bihar
- district: Patna
- block: Masaurhi

Population (2011)
  - Total: 993

Akauna is a village located in Masaurhi block, Patna district, Bihar, India.

== Population ==
Akauna has a total of 216 houses in it. The Akauna village has population of 993 of which 527 are males and 466 are females as per the Population Census of 2011.

The population of children ages 0 to 6 is 172 which makes up 17.32% of the total population of the village. The average sex ratio is 884 which is lower than the Bihar state average of 918. The child sex ratio as per the census is 997, higher than the Bihar average of 935.

== Education ==
Akauna village has a lower literacy rate compared to Bihar. In 2011, the literacy rate of Akauna village was 59.20% compared to 61.80% for Bihar. Male literacy was at 68.18% while female literacy was 48.82%.

== Income sources ==
Out of the total population of Akauna, 560 people were engaged in work activities. Of these workers, 51.96% described their work as lasting more than six months, while 48.04% described their work as lasting less than six months. Of the workers, 207 were agricultural laborers.
