= Akauna, Nalanda =

Akauna
- Village
- Location in India
- Coordinates: 25°07′14″N 85°24′17″E
- Country: India
- State: Bihar
- district: Nalanda
- Block: Ben
- Mukhiya: Abhinay Kumar Singh

Population (2011)
  - Total: 3,393

Akauna is a large village located in Ben block, Nalanda district, Bihar, India.

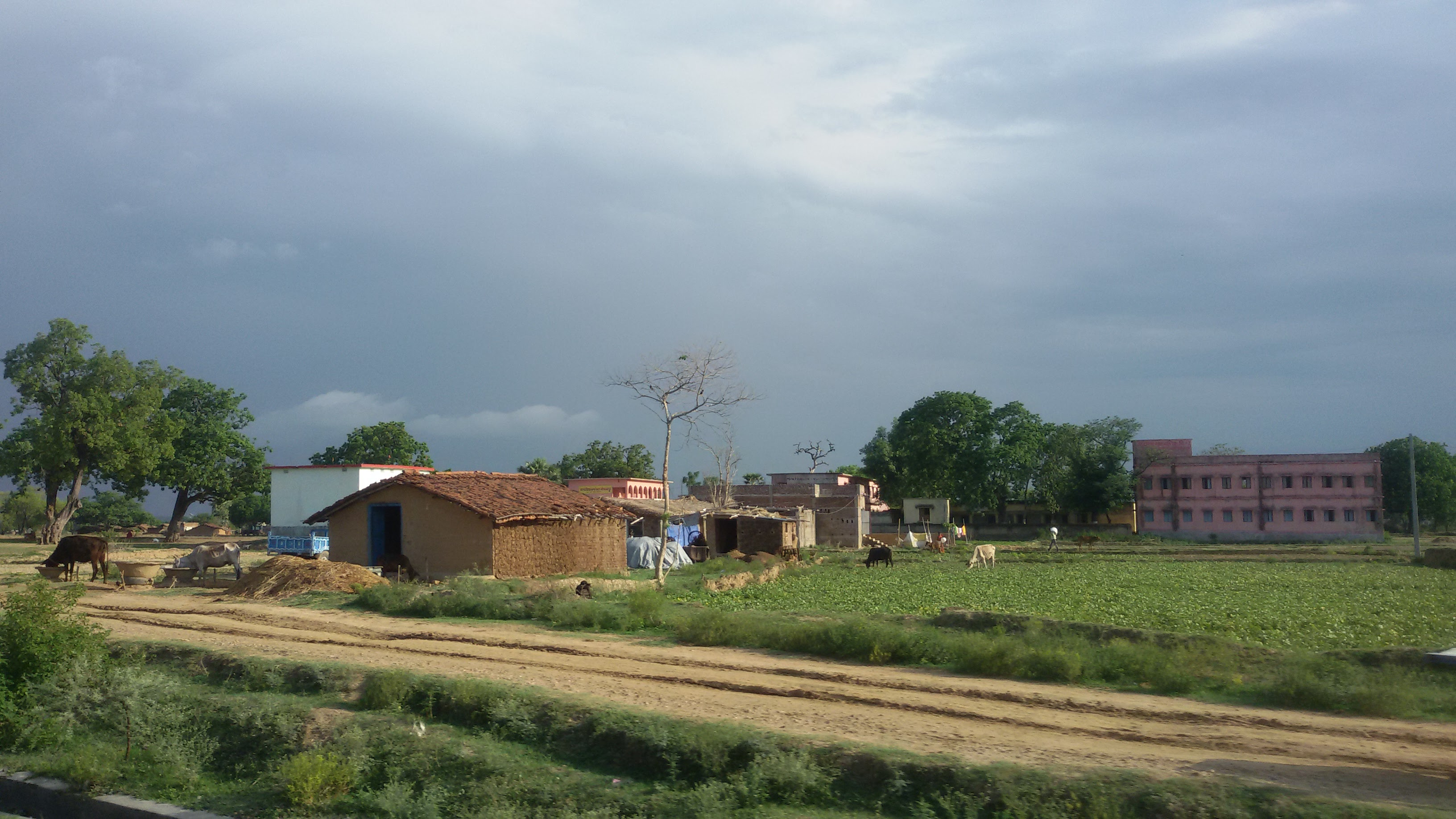
Akauna, Nalanda, Bihar

== Population ==
Akauna has a total of 568 houses in it. The Akauna village has population of 3393 of which 1792 are males and 1601 are females as per the Population Census of 2011.

The population of children ages 0 to 6 is 553 which makes up 16.29% of the total population of the village. The average sex ratio is 893 which is lower than the Bihar state average of 918. The child sex ratio as per the census is 1119, higher than the Bihar average of 935.

== Income sources ==
Out of the total population of Akauna, 1221 people were engaged in work activities. Of these workers, 78.38% described their work as lasting more than six months, while 21.62% described their work as lasting less than six months. Of the workers engaging in long-lasting work, 397 were agricultural laborers and 476 were owner or co-owner of land and farmed it.
