= Akauna Minhai, Nawada =

Akauna
- Village
- Country: India
- State: Bihar
- district: Nawada
- block: Nawada

Population (2011)
  - Total: 2,388

Akauna Minhai also known as Akauna Bazar is a small village located in Nawada (beside NH 31), Nawada, Bihar, India.

== Population ==
Akauna Minhai has a total of 352 houses in it. The Akauna Minhai village has population of 2388 of which 1221 are males and 1167 are females as per the Population Census of 2011.

The population of children ages 0 to 6 is 415 which makes up 17.38% of the total population of the village. The average sex ratio is 956 which is higher than the Bihar state average of 918. The child sex ratio as per the census is 1065, higher than the Bihar average of 935.

== Education ==
Akauna Minhai village has a lower literacy rate compared to Bihar. In 2011, the literacy rate of Akauna Minhai village was 59.71% compared to 61.80% for Bihar. Male literacy was at 70.39% while female literacy was 48.27%.

== Income sources ==
Out of the total population of Akauna Minhai, 1110 people were engaged in work activities. Of these workers, 62.43% described their work as lasting more than six months, while 37.57% described their work as lasting less than six months. Of the workers engaged in work lasting longer than six months, 264 were agricultural laborers and 140 were owners of land that they farmed.
