= Akauna, Nawada =

Akauna
- Village
- Interactive map of Akauna
- Country: India
- State: Bihar
- district: Nawada
- block: Sirdala

Population (2011)
  - Total: 2,109

Akauna is a large village located in Sirdala block, Nawada district, Bihar, India.

== Population ==
Akauna has a total of 84 houses in it. The Akauna village has population of 2109 of which 1100 are males and 1009 are females as per the Population Census of 2011.

The population of children ages 0 to 6 is 418 which makes up 19.82% of the total population of the village. The average sex ratio is 917 which is lower than the Bihar state average of 918. The child sex ratio as per the census is 981, higher than the Bihar average of 935.

== Education ==
Akauna village has a higher literacy rate compared to Bihar. In 2011, the literacy rate of Akauna village was 64.28% compared to 61.80% for Bihar. Male literacy was at 82.68% while female literacy was 43.89%.

== Income sources ==
Out of the total population of Akauna, 643 people were engaged in work activities. Of these workers, 55.52% described their work as lasting more than six months, while 44.48% described their work as lasting less than six months. Of the workers engaged in work lasting longer than six months, 46 were agricultural laborers and 277 were owners of land that they farmed.
