= Rajauli =

- Township (tehsil or block) and Sub-Division (Sub-District)
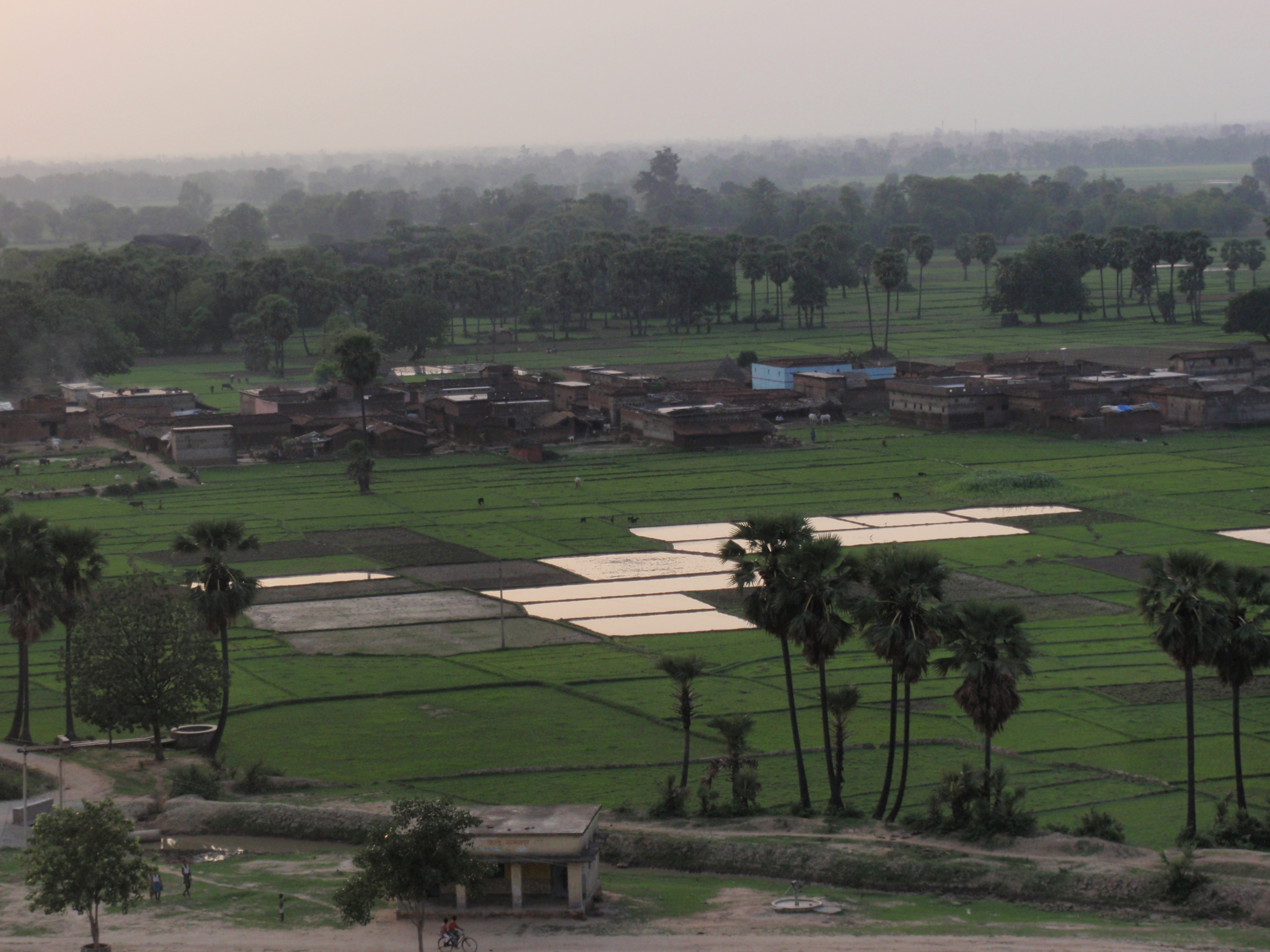

- Location in Bihar, India
- Coordinates: 24°39′0″N 85°30′0″E
- Country: India
- State: Bihar
- District: Nawada

Government
  - Type: Nagar panchayat
- Elevation: 135 m (443 ft)

Population (2011)
  - Total: 166,226

Languages
  - Official: Magahi, Hindi
- Time zone: UTC+5:30 (IST)
- PIN: 805125
- Telephone code: 06336
- Nearest city: Nawada, Koderma, Jhumri Telaiya, Gaya
- Literacy: 68%
- Lok Sabha constituency: Nawada
- Avg. summer temperature: 32 °C (90 °F)
- Avg. winter temperature: 19 °C (66 °F)

Rajauli (Note: Previously also spelt as "Rajouly", "Rajowly" or "Rajawali".) is a tehsil, block and subdivision (sub–district) in Nawada district of Magadh division of the Indian state of Bihar. The tehsil of Rajauli is located at a distance of about 30 kilometres (19 mi) from Nawada city on National Highway 20 (previously numbered as NH31) and is situated on the bank of Dhanarjay (Note: Also spelt Dhanarjeh, Dhanarje and Dhanarji) river. Rajauli, a Scheduled Caste (SC) reserved Assembly Constituency (AC) seat, had a total of 302900 electors during the 2015 Bihar Legislative Assembly election. Rajauli subdivision consists of 95 panchayats and 688 revenue villages while Rajauli block consists of 17 panchayats and 169 revenue villages.

The hills in Rajauli's neighbourhood have religious significance for Hindus and many legends are attached to them. Rishis such as Shringi, Durvasa, Gautama and Lomasa have their ashrams on eponymously named peaks here. Veer Lorik, the Ahir cowherd hero, is said to have been born in the area and was the reason for the bountiful cultivation in and around Rajauli at one time. Rajauli has a Sikh connection including a visit by Guru Nanak. The Gurudwara Rajauli Sangat, one of the largest sangats in the state, is in Rajauli and is part of Bihar Tourism's "Guru Circuit".

== History ==
Francis Buchanan-Hamilton passed through Rajauli during his surveys of Patna and Gaya in 1811–1812. He kept a journal in which he wrote on 14 December 1811, "[…] the town of Rajauli situated among fine mango groves. These were all planted by a Fakir, a most venerable personage, by whom I was visited on my arrival. He is a Saiud born at Baragong near Mirzapur, and after some adventures in the west came and sat down here in the midst of wild beasts and the devils worshipped by the Infidels. After a residence of 25 years he attracted the notice of Kamgar Khan, from who he obtained a considerable grant of lands, which he has brought into cultivation and ornamented with fine plantations."

An Archaeological Survey of India report by J D Beglar in 1872–73 mentions that the hills of Rajauli "are in their way deserving of mention", as they are said to have been home to the Saptarishis (transl. seven Rishis or sages). The peaks here are named after a number of saints. Singar Peak, named after Sringi Rishi, is ascended by devotees while at the base an annual fair takes place. The 1873 survey report also mentioned an annual fair at Ektara, Mahabar hill, Satgaon — "Ektâra is a small place of pilgrimage situated in the wild Rajauli Hills at the source of the Dhanarjeh river which flows past Rajauli; here is a very picturesque waterfall and a small rock cell; not far from here I see "rock temples" marked in the Indian Atlas sheet, but my enquiries for them were vain." Other rishis including Durvasa, Lomasa and Gautama lived in Rajaulis neighbourhood; with their ashrams also housing Goddess Durga and Goddess Indra, the later to whom villagers use to pray during times of drought. Dubaur, 15 kilometers south of Rajauli, claims to be the birthplace of Goala (Ahir) Veer Lorik. Lorik is said to have been the force behind Rajauli's transformation into a cultivated plain. Buchanan wrote that Dubaur is "a village of Bhunghiyas belonging to Brijomohun Saha, a Ghatwal".

By 1875, Bihar to Rajauli was a metaled road, a rarity in the region at the time. The Maksudpar estate, (Note: "The Fort at Maksudpur [...] was conquered by the ancestors of the Rajas of Maksudpur from the Mughal Faujdar of Pargana Sanaut in the year 1710.") which in 1900–04 included 160 villages, covered 130 square miles (340 km^{2}) of which about 60 square miles (160 km^{2}) of land was in and around Rajauli. In 1901, the population of Rajauli village was 1509. It was connected to Nawada, 18 km to the north, by a metaled road. Rajauli was an important market for the neighbouring hills.

In 1906 L.S.S. O'Malley of the Indian Civil Service wrote that Rajauli, "possesses and excellent system of drainage, which dates back to the time it was a municipality. The drains are of cement, but since the abolition of the municipality they have been neglected and have become silted up. Rajauli contains a police-station, a branch establishment of the Nanakpanthi monastery at Akbarpur (8 miles to the north), and a Muhammadan charitable endowment, in which there is a sacred fire said to have been lit 300 years ago by fire brought from Mecca."

Rajauli's neighbourhood also had granite and mica mines which were described by explorers and surveyors. In 1838, Robert Montgomery Martin described these in detail after a visit, also mentioning the presence of "felspar" (however most of these locations are now in Jharkhand).

=== Sikh connection and Gurdwara Rajauli Sangat ===
A large fort-like building in the center of the town is called 'sangat', meaning "a body of men and women who meet religiously specially in presence of the 'Guru Granth Sahib'". It is one of the largest sangats in Bihar. The Directorate of Tourism of the Government of Bihar places Gurdwara Rajauli Sangat in its official "Guru Circuit":

Gurdwara Rajauli Sangat, which is about 4 acres in Rajauli has the khapar of Bhagat Bhagwan, presented to him by Hingraj Devi Sangat. This 200 year old holy place of worship comprises of about 50 residential rooms. One can take a glimpse of the 100 year old handwritten bir of Guru Granth Sahib and some Hindu deities. There are some Samadhis and gates in the complex with the name of Baba Sandbux Das written in Gurmukhi.

— Guru Circuit pamphlet, Bihar Tourism

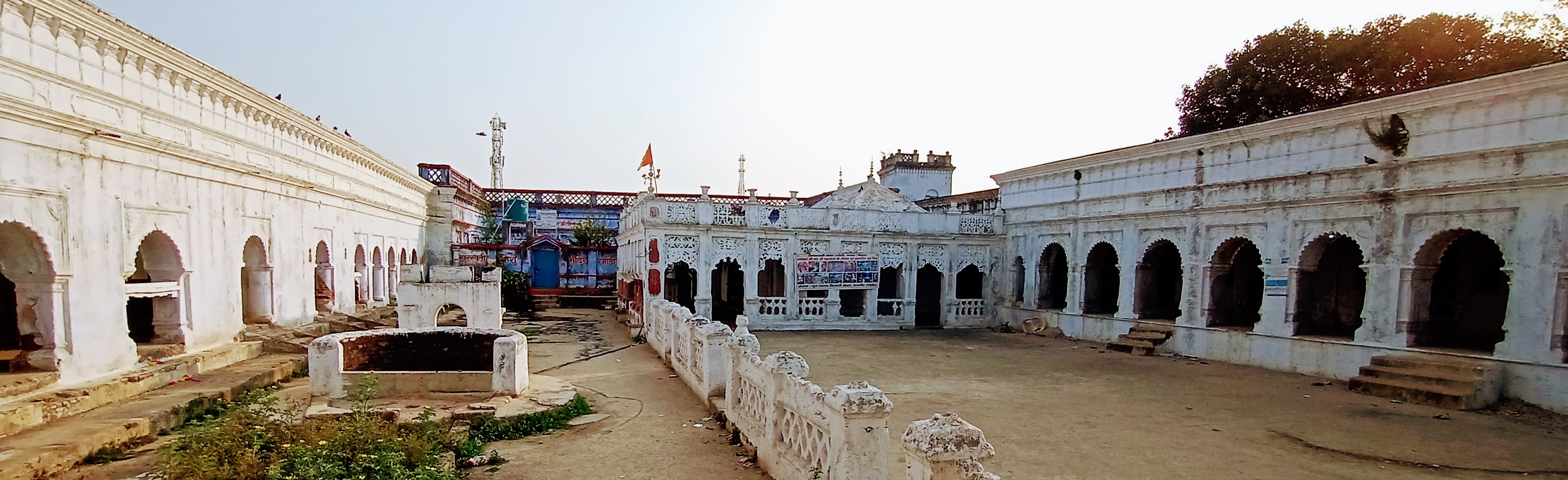
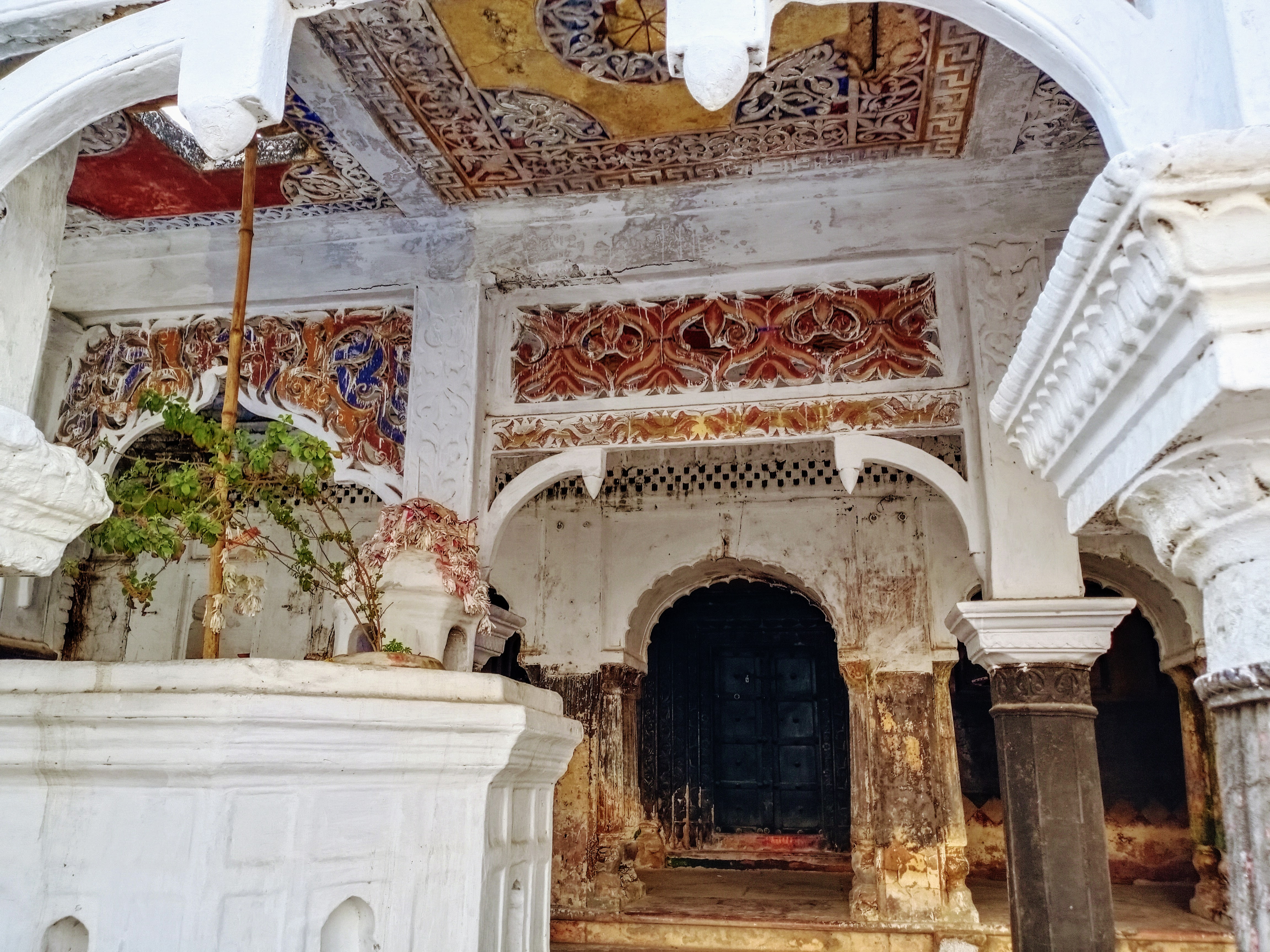
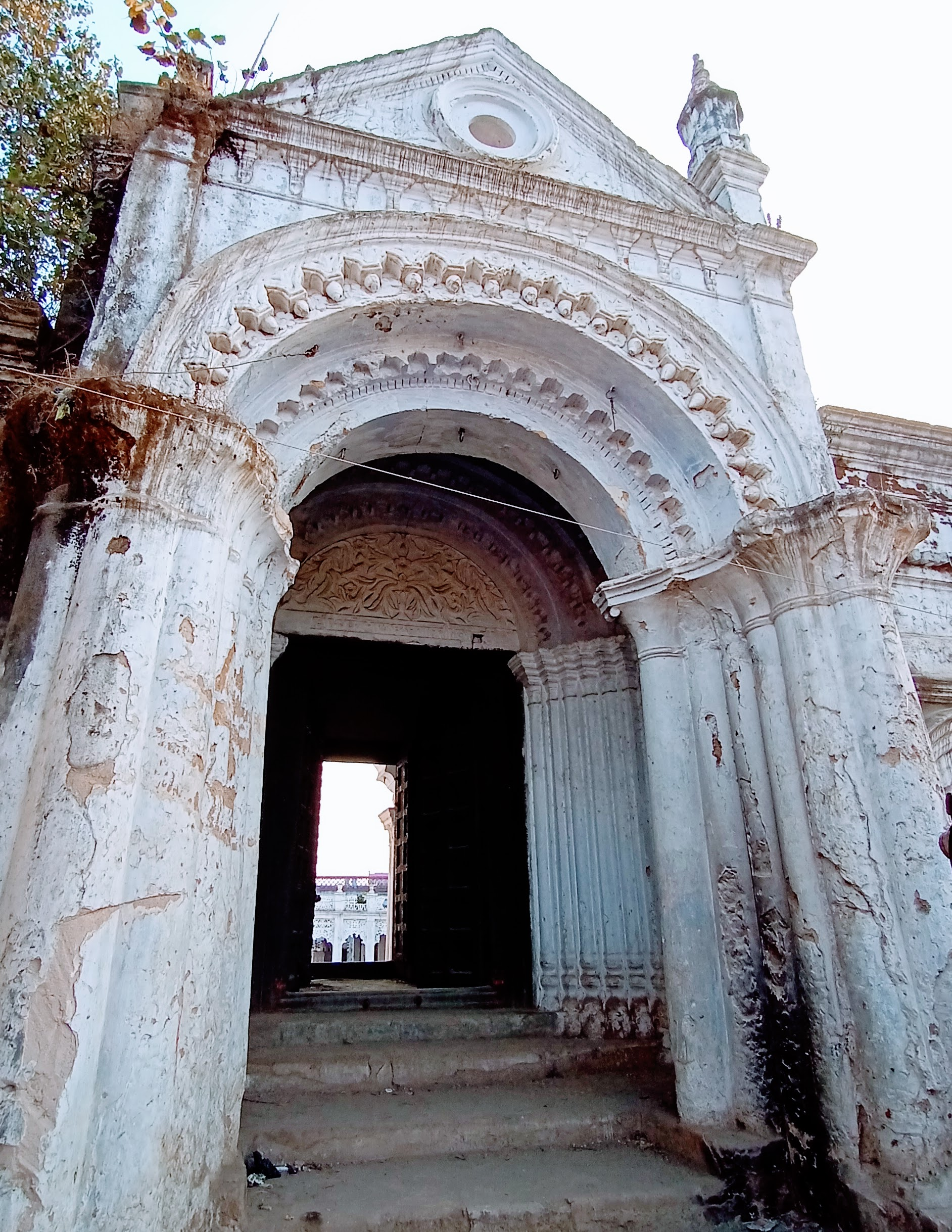
The 200 year old Sangat

Francis Buchanan-Hamilton wrote in 1811 that Rajauli "has a Sanget of the followers of Nanak, a large neat–looking place with a tiled roof".

Guru Nanak is said to have stopped at Rajauli. In Dr Trilochan Singh's biography of Guru Nanak he writes, "Rajauli bears witness to the fact that the Buddhist sages of this area accepted the teachings of Guru Nanak and established permanent centres of Guru Nanak’s school of thought in this region".

A fair during Guru Nanak Gurpurab takes place here. There is a Khankah at some distance from the Sangat.

== Geography ==
Rajauli is situated along the Dhanarjay river on NH 20 (previously numbered as NH31). It is 30 kilometres (19 mi) from the district city Nawada and 144 kilometres (89 mi) from Patna. Rajauli is a sub-division that borders the state of Jharkhand, and has an elevation of 135 m above sea level. Rajauli is mainly surrounded by small and mid-range mountains including Lomash Rishi and Shringi Rishi mountains. More than 100 villages make up Rajauli subdistrict. Rajauli was once home to monsoon and prairie forest. The principal trees were sakhua, paisar, khair, Shisham, parmi, salaiya simar, kendu and peepal. The forest and wild life have almost completely disappeared. Gautam Budha Wildlife Sanctuary is nearby.

Interactive map of Rajauli and nearby locations

== Demographics ==
In 1901, the population of Rajauli village was 1509. By 1951, the population was 12,673. According to the 2011 census of India, Rajauli sub–district had a population of 1,66,226 with 24444 households.

Decadal Variation In Population Since 1901 for Nawada district View source data.

Demographics (2011 Census)
	Total	Male	Female
Population	166226	85846	80380
Children aged below 6 years	28853	14820	14033
Scheduled caste	45489	23378	22111
Scheduled tribe	97	49	48
Literates	81035	49273	31762
Illiterates	85191	36573	48618
Workers (all)	62961	41014	21947
Main workers (total)	42744	30709	12035
Main workers: Cultivators	12570	9510	3060
Main workers: Agricultural labourers	16233	11500	4733
Main workers: Household industry workers	2727	1471	1256
Main workers: Other	11214	8228	9912
Marginal workers (total)	20217	10305	9912
Marginal workers: Cultivators	2701	1420	1281
Marginal workers: Agricultural labourers	11362	6011	5351
Marginal workers: Household industry workers	1717	598	1119
Marginal workers: Others	4437	2276	2161
Non-workers	103265	44832	58433

== Administrative divisions ==
In December 2008, Bihar Chief Minister Nitish Kumar announced that Rajauli would be made into a Nagar Panchayat. For over a decade the matter of converting Rajauli into a Nagar Panchayat had been pending; even after government approval, delimitation problems caused delays. News reports emerged of Rajauli being upgraded into a Nagar Panchayat in December 2020, however administratively the implementation will take a couple of months.

Rajauli subdivision has seven blocks: Akbarpur, Govindpur, Meskaur, Narhat, Rajauli, Roh, Siradala.

Blocks, panchayats and revenue villages in Rajauli Subdivision
District	Sub Division	Blocks	No. of Panchayats	No. of Revenue Villages
Nawada	Rajauli	Akbarpur	20	157
Nawada	Rajauli	Govindpur	9	73
Nawada	Rajauli	Meskaur	10	58
Nawada	Rajauli	Narhat	10	65
Nawada	Rajauli	Rajauli	17	169
Nawada	Rajauli	Roh	14	77
Nawada	Rajauli	Siradala	15	89
Total		7	95	688

== Politics ==
In the 2020 Bihar Legislative Assembly election in Rajauli Assembly constituency, RJD won. Prakash Veer is the sitting Member of the Legislative Assembly (MLA) from the Rajauli Assembly constituency.

== Public amenities ==
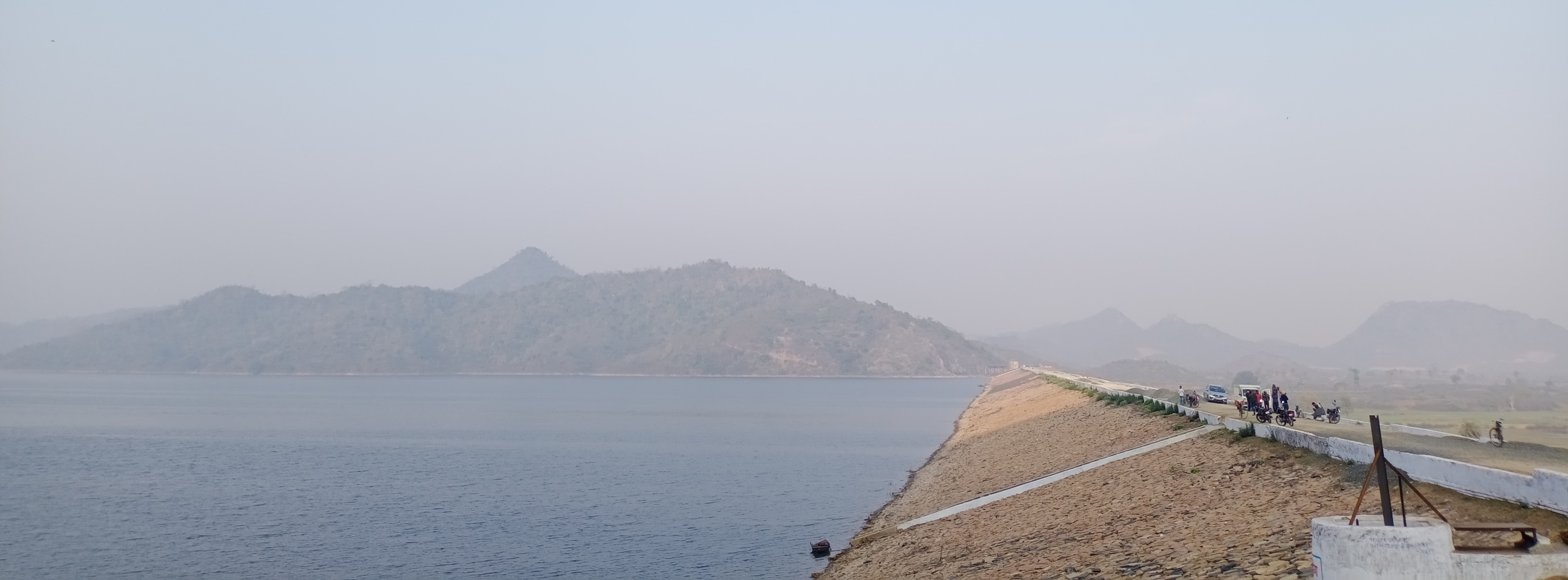
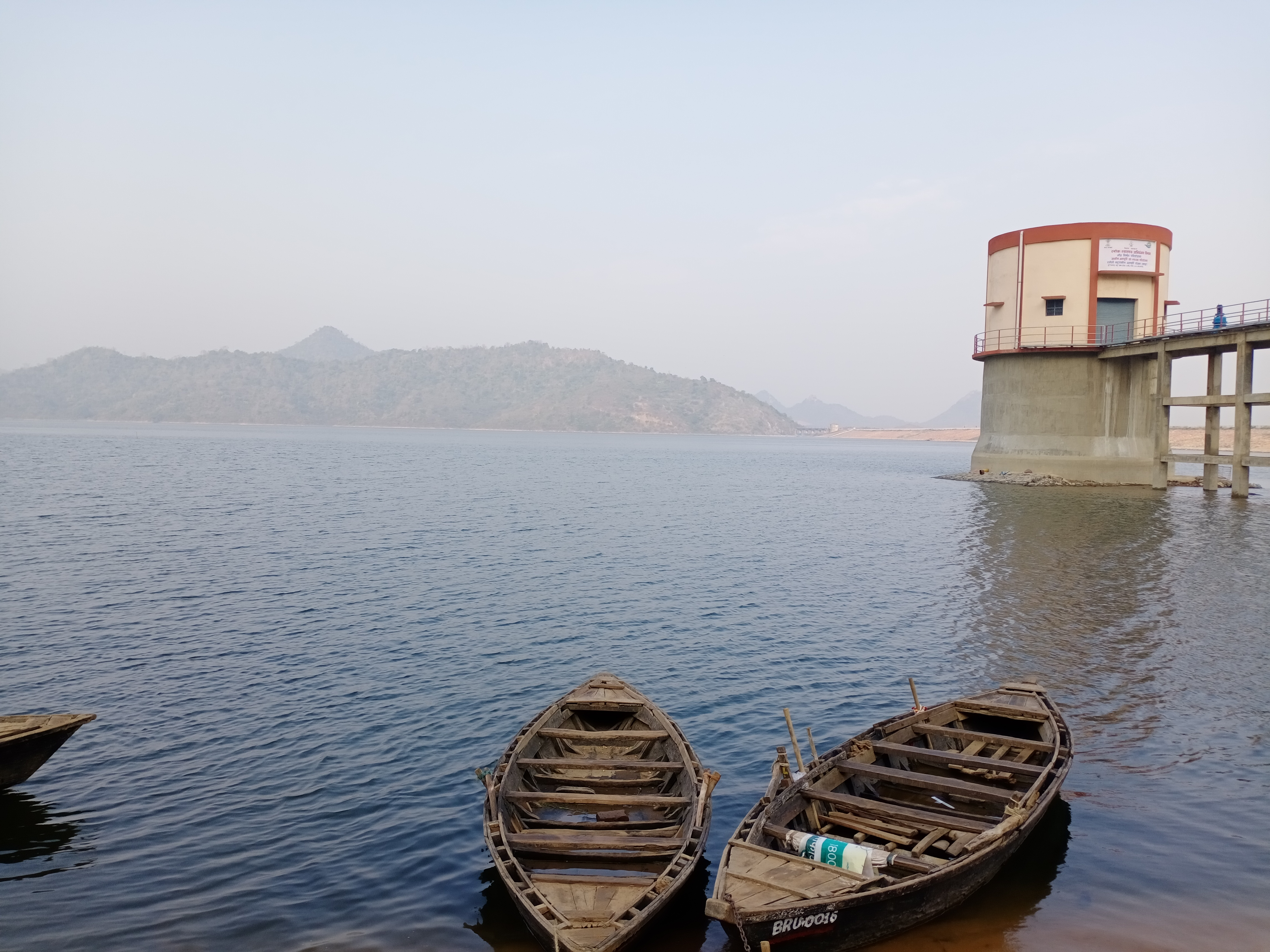
Phulwaria dam and reservoir was built for the purpose of irrigation. It was completed in 1988 and lies on the Tilaiya River. The dam has a height of 25.66m and length of 1135m.

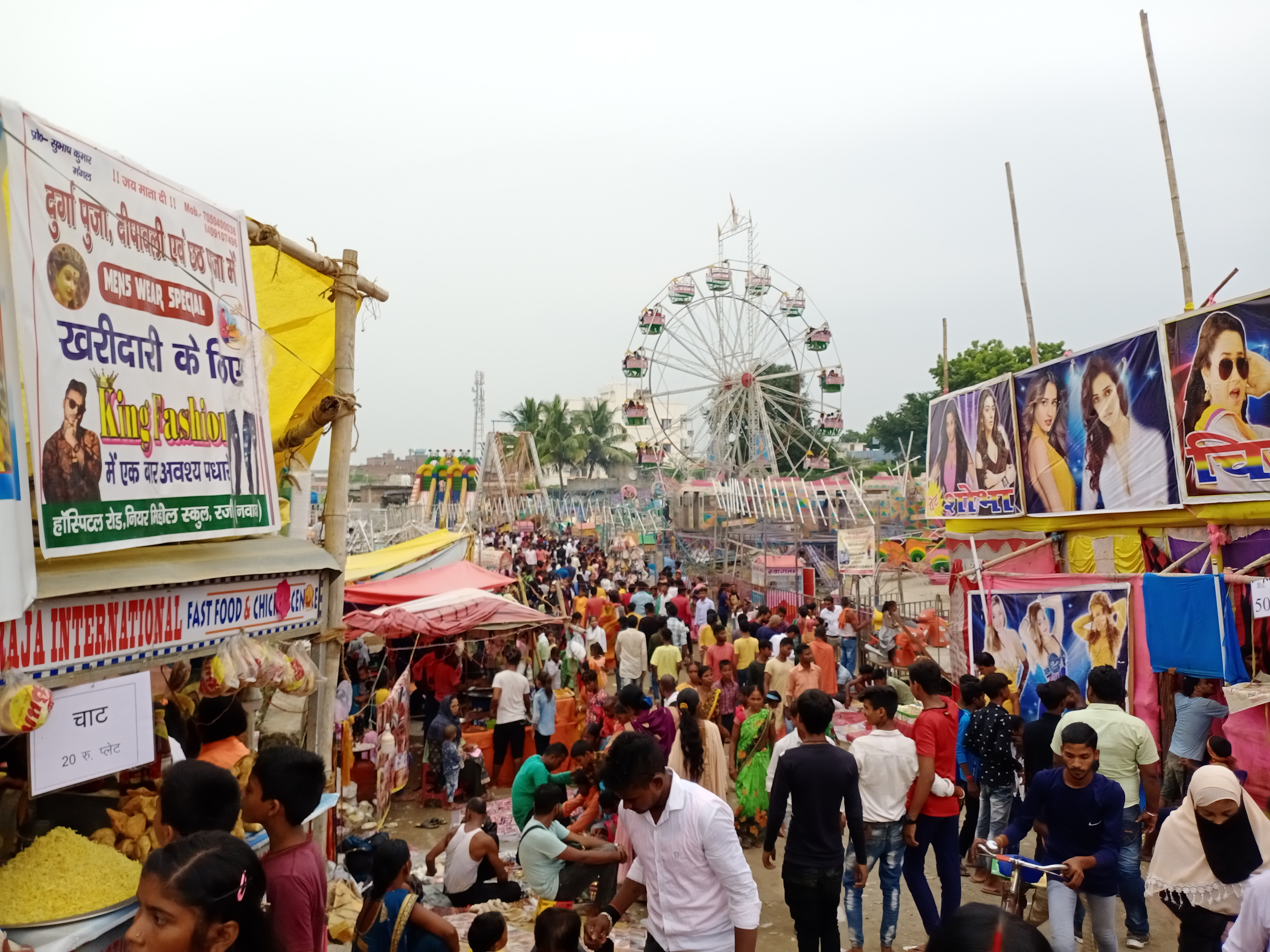
A fair in Rajauli, 2022

=== Health ===
Rajauli has a Primary Health Centre (PHC) (Note: "Primary Health Centre is the cornerstone of rural health services [...] A typical Primary Health Centre covers a population of 20,000 in hilly, tribal, or difficult areas and 30,000 populations in plain areas with 6 indoor/observation beds [...] PHCs should become a 24 hour facility with nursing facilities...") as well as a 75-bed Sub-Divisional Hospital (SDH). In 2021 the sub-divisional hospital had posts for 33 doctors out of which 5 general doctors and numerous nursing staff are deputed. There is no provision of a female doctor, and other basic facilities were lacking.

=== Transport ===
The nearest airport is Gaya Airport, 72 km distant. The nearest railway station is at Dilwa, 19 km away. A limited number of passenger trains stop there. The bigger stations are Koderma (32 km away) and Gaya Junction (70 km away). Rajauli is on NH20 (old NH 31) and well-connected by bus services. Buses on their way to and from Patna, Gaya and Ranchi stop at Rajauli or at Chhapra for food. For most buses travelling between Patna and Ranchi, Rajauli is a meal stop. Local people come to Rajauli using their bicycles, jugaads, cars or tractors.

=== Education ===
In 2017, Rajauli block had 143 schools.

The Rajauli Inter School located at block headquarters lacked computer facilities in May 2022, accordingly computer related subjects are not taught. Inspections have revealed basic shortcomings in the situation of some schools located in more rural areas of the block.

In 2022, Project Kanya Inter School, Rajauli, produced a state topper in the Bihar School Examination Board exams in which over 16 lakh candidates participated.

- Maa Mathurasini Mahavidyalaya
- Rajauli Inter Vidyalaya
- Project Kanya Uccha Vidhyalala
- Rajkiye Kanya Madhya Vidhyalaya
- Rajkiye Uccha Vidhyalaya
- Saptrashi Degree College
- Saraswati Shishu/vidya Mandir
- Dayanand Anglo vidyalaya (DAV)
- St. Joseph's school
- South city international public school
- Brilliant Public School
- Tara Memorial Residential school
- Rajeev Gandhi computer Saksharta mission

== Economy ==
Nuclear Power Corporation of India has identified Rajauli as a prospective location for creating a 2,000-mW nuclear power plant. There are plans to set up a 28MW hydro power plant in Rajauli, which will help Bihar become energy independent. Water will be provided from Phulwaria dam reservoir.

=== Agriculture ===
Rajauli has clay loam soil. The accumulation of rain or flood water over a considerable part of the district makes the land fit for paddy cultivation. Principal crops are paddy, wheat, gram, maze, arhar, khesari, peas, sugarcane, potatoes, chillies and mung. Aghani or winter rice is usually cultivated in the lowlands.

=== Business ===
Nearly half the population of Rajauli is engaged in small- and medium-sized businesses. Balushahi is one of the popular takeaways from this place. One of the major businesses in Rajauli is the marketing of agricultural produce. Local merchants sell cloth, kirana, manihari, medicines, and local furniture. The weekly Friday Hat at Bajrangbali Chowk is popular. A few mills, including the rice mill Navdurga Agrotech Pvt., processes raw and export to other states.

== Places of worship ==
Temples include the Bajrangbali temple, Devi Mandap, Shivalaya, Manokamna Dham, Bajrangbali, Kali Mandir and other temples.

== Gallery ==
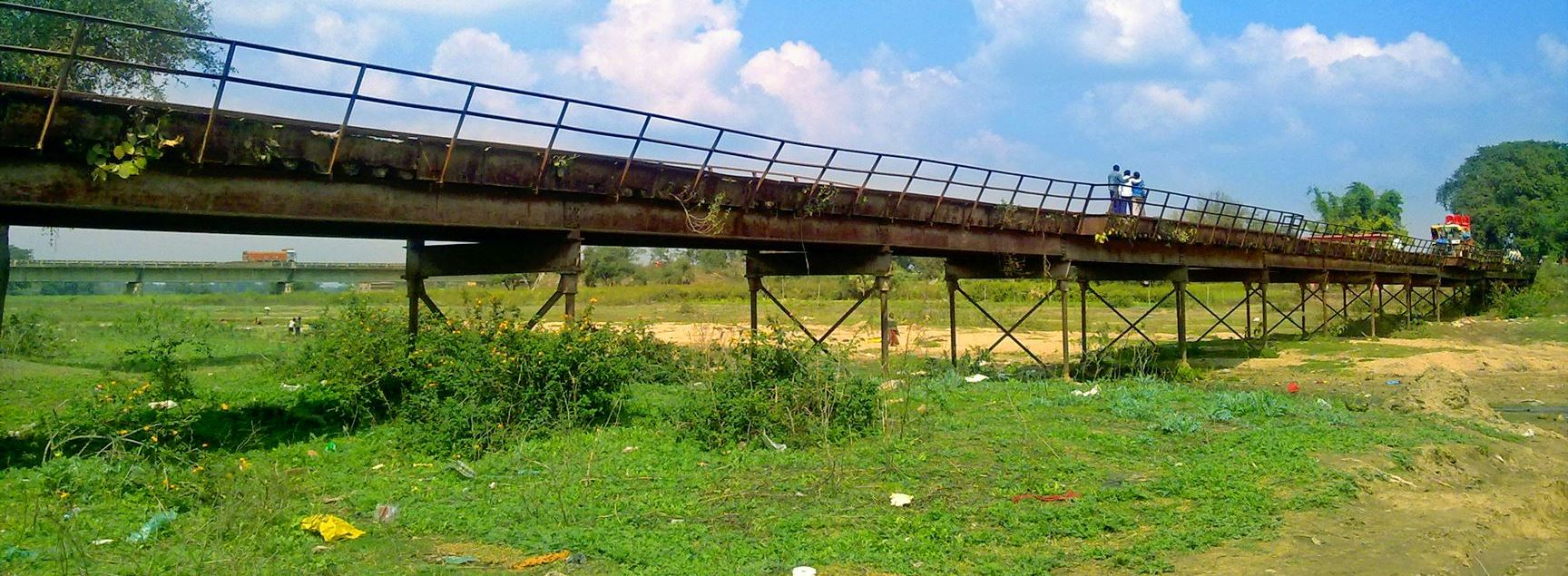
The oldest bridge connected to the outer part of Rajauli, including Simarcol, Amama, Pasraila and Targeer.

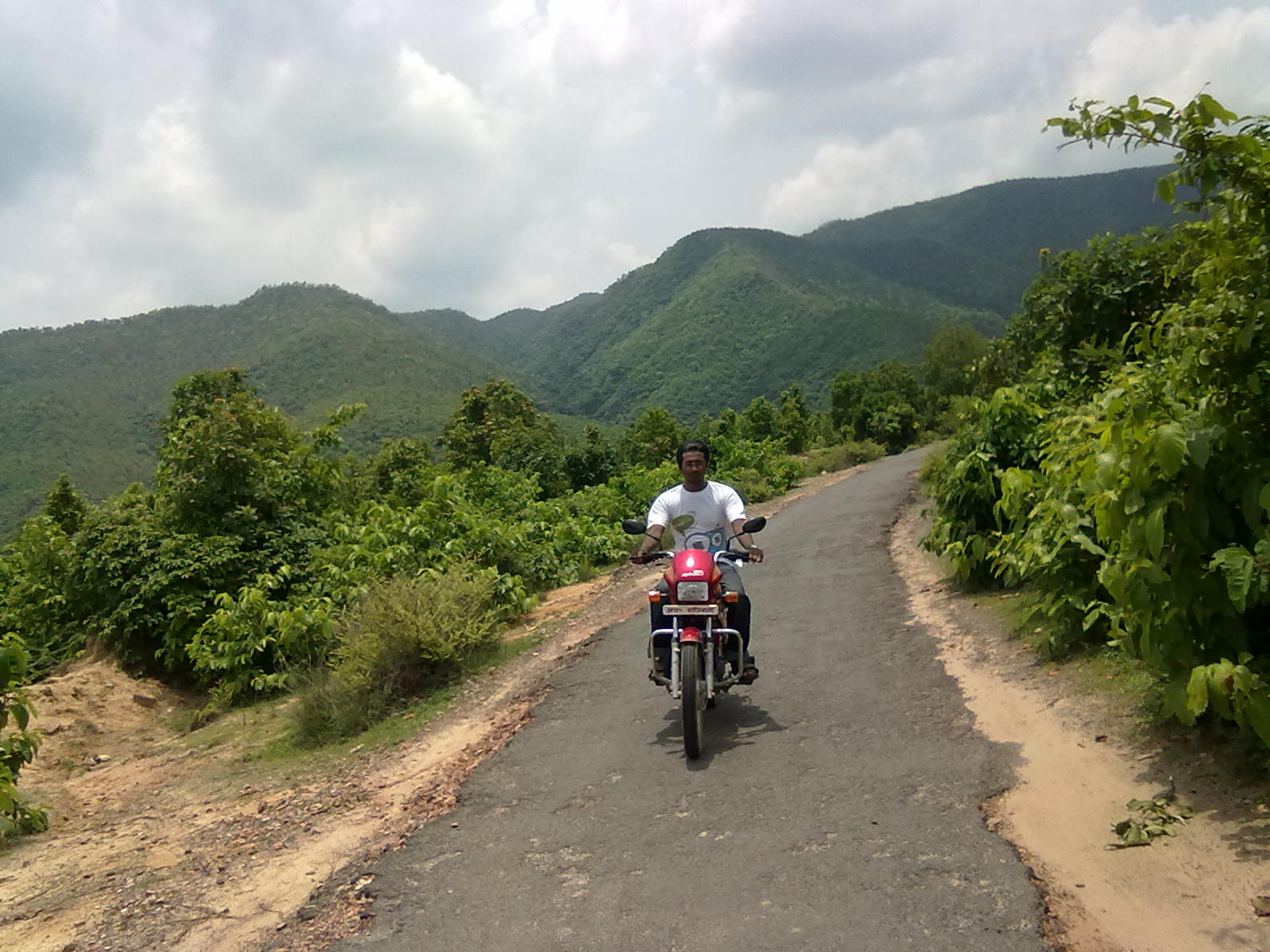
Road to Kakolat

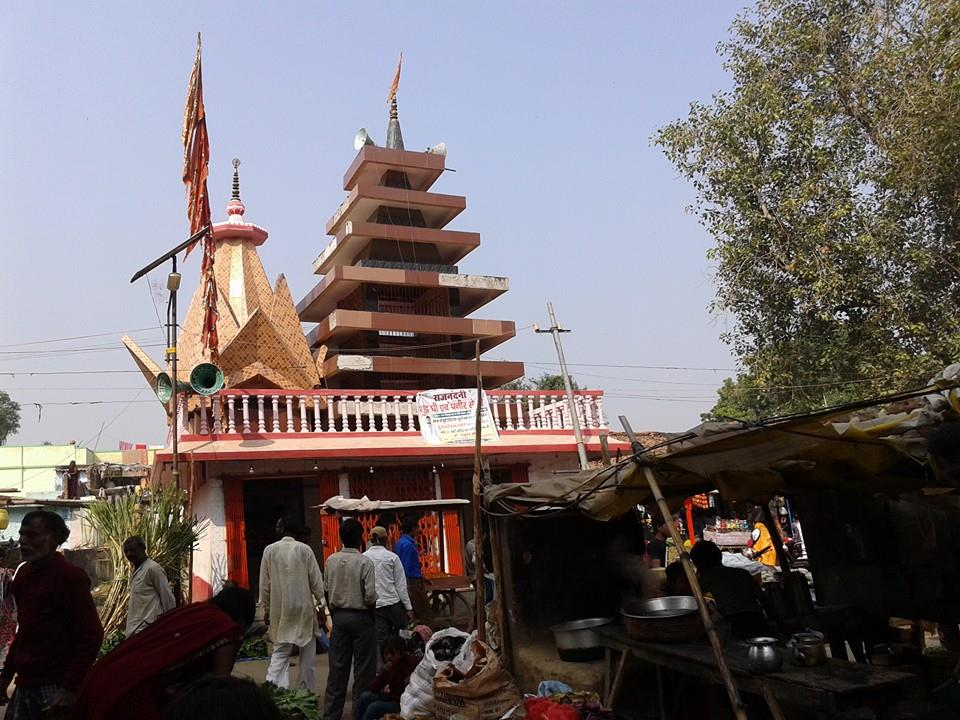
Temple near the Purani bus stand

== Notable people ==
- Ganesh Shankar Vidyarthi (politician)

== See also ==
- Tekari Raj
