= Pakribarawan (community development block) =

- Town
- Location in Bihar, India
- Coordinates: 24.9516193°N 85.7347475°E
- Country: India
- State: Bihar
- District: Nawada
- Elevation: 68 m (223 ft)

Population (2011)
  - Total: 68,780
  - Density: 376/km^{2} (970/sq mi)

Languages
  - Official: Hindi, English, Urdu
- Time zone: UTC+5:30 (IST)
- PIN: 805124
- Telephone code: 06325
- ISO 3166 code: IN-BR
- Vehicle registration: BR-27
- Sex ratio: 1000-948 ♂/♀

Pakribarawan is a town in the Nawada District of the Indian state of Bihar.

== Geography ==
The town of Pakribarawan is located at 25.01°N 85.63°E on Nawada-Jamui SH-8, 22 km away from the town of Nawada. It is divided into two Gram Panchayats: Pakribarawan Uttar (North) and Pakribarawan Dakshini (South).

== Demographics ==
As of 2011, the town has a population of 68,780.

In Pakri Barawan, the female to male sex ratio is 948/1,000, higher than the state average of 918/1,000. The sex ratio for children in Pakri Barawan is 924:1,000, compared to the Bihar state average of 935:1,000.

The literacy rate of the town is on average 58.64%, lower than the state average of 61.80%. The male literacy rate is approximately 66.87%, and the female literacy rate is approximately 49.64%. Scheduled Castes (SC) constitute 11.58% of the total population, while Schedule Tribes (ST) constitute 0.02%.
