= Nawada district =

District in Bihar, India

Coordinates: 24°45′N 85°00′E

- District of Bihar
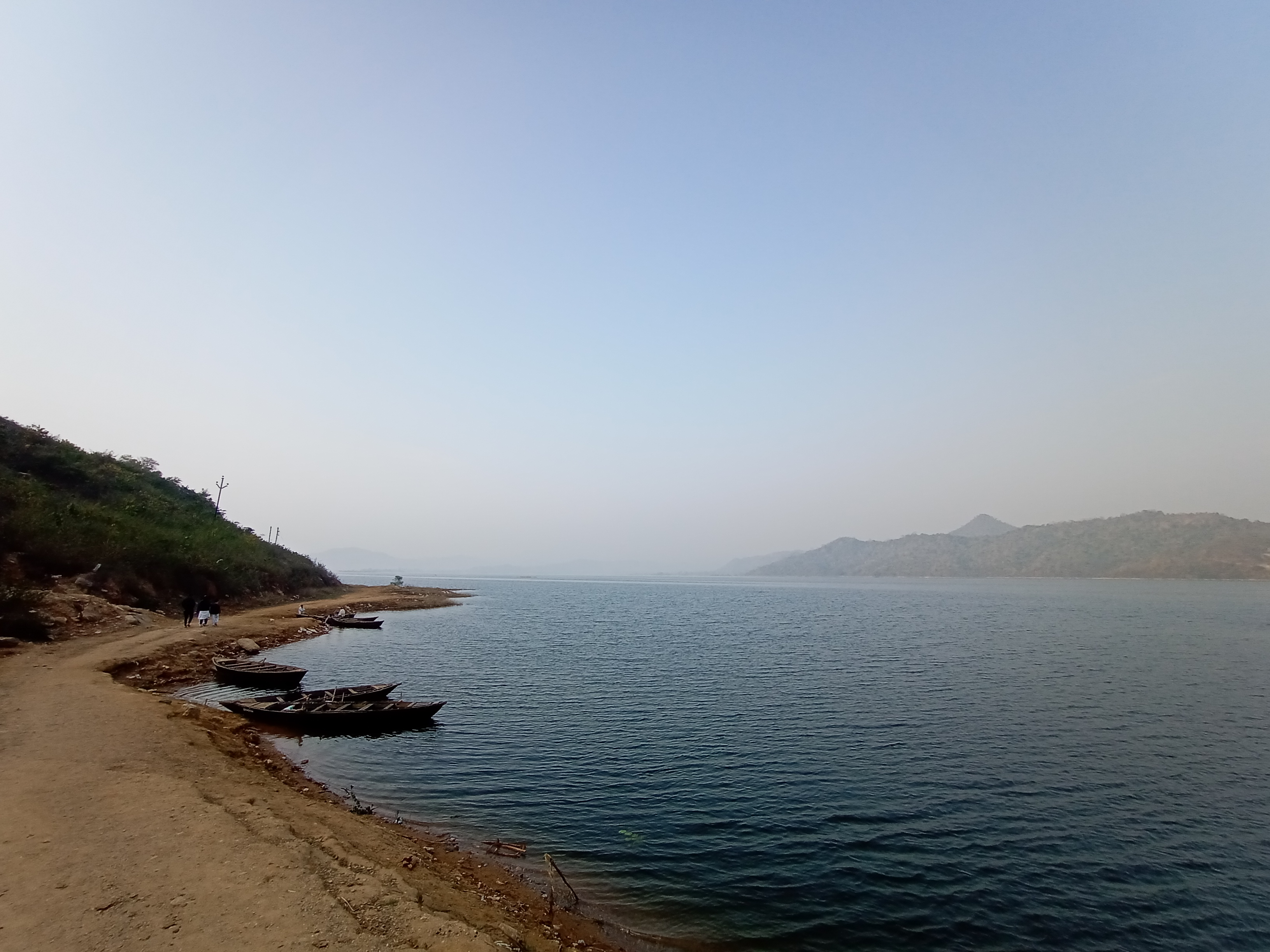
- Phulwaria reservoir

- Location of Nawada district in Bihar
- Country: India
- State: Bihar
- Division: Magadh
- Headquarters: Nawada

Government
  - Lok Sabha constituencies: Nawada
  - Vidhan Sabha constituencies: Nawada, Hisua, Rajauli, Gobindpur & Warisaliganj.

Area
  - Total: 2,494 km^{2} (963 sq mi)

Population (2011)
  - Total: 2,219,146
  - Density: 889.8/km^{2} (2,305/sq mi)
  - Urban: 215,579

Demographics
  - Literacy: 59.76%
  - Sex ratio: 939
- Time zone: UTC+05:30 (IST)
- Major highways: NH 20, NH 120
- Website: nawada.nic.in

Nawada district is one of the thirty-eight districts of the Indian state of Bihar. Nawada is its administrative headquarters. The district is the easternmost district of the Magadh division, one of the nine administrative divisions of Bihar. The area of the modern district was historically part of the Magadha, Shunga and Gupta empires. Koderma and Giridih districts of the state of Jharkhand lie on the southern border of the district; it also shares borders with the Gaya, Nalanda, Sheikhpura, and Jamui districts of Bihar.

== History ==
Nawada, located in southern Bihar, has a history deeply connected to ancient Magadha. and the region was later ruled by major dynasties including the Mauryas, Guptas, and Kanvas. Archaeological sites, prehistoric rock art, and ancient ruins indicate human settlement for well over a thousand years.

The name “Nawada” comes from the Persian words nau-abad, meaning “new town”. In the colonial era, it was known as Eliot Market (Bazaar). The Khuri River runs through the town, with the older part on the left bank and the modern area, including public offices, on the right bank.

During medieval times, Nawada came under the Delhi Sultanate and Mughal Empire, followed by local rulers such as the Rajas of Hisua and the Muslim Mayi clan. Under British rule, it became a subdivision of Gaya district in 1845. During the 1857 Indian Rebellion, public buildings in Nawada were destroyed, though government records were preserved by hiding them in a nearby hill cave. On 26 January 1973, Nawada was officially made a separate district.

One of the city’s most important modern landmarks is the Sarvodaya Ashram, inaugurated by India’s first President Dr. Rajendra Prasad and later developed by social reformer Jayaprakash Narayan. It became a hub for socio-political activities in the region.

Nawada is also known for its rich religious and cultural heritage. The Surya Narayana Mandir at Handiya, believed to date back to the Dwaparayuga and founded by King Jarasandha, attracts millions of devotees annually. Tapoban is regarded as the birthplace of Jarasandha, while Sitamarhi is associated with the birth of Lava, son of Goddess Sita. The picturesque Kakolat Falls, mentioned in Hindu Pauranic history as the abode of a king transformed into a python by a sage’s curse, is both a popular pilgrimage site and tourist attraction. Additionally, Nawada’s location offers easy access to nearby historical cities such as Bodhgaya, Pawapuri, Rajgir, and Nalanda.

== Geography ==
Nawada district occupies an area of 2,494 square kilometres (963 sq mi), comparatively equivalent to Chile's Navarino Island. Most parts of the district are plain but some areas are hilly. The main rivers are the Sakri, Khuri, Panchane, Bhusri by Kakolat and Tilaiya.

== Administrative divisions ==
Nawada District is divided into two Sub-divisions and then into 14 blocks. These blocks in their respective sub-divisions are as follows :

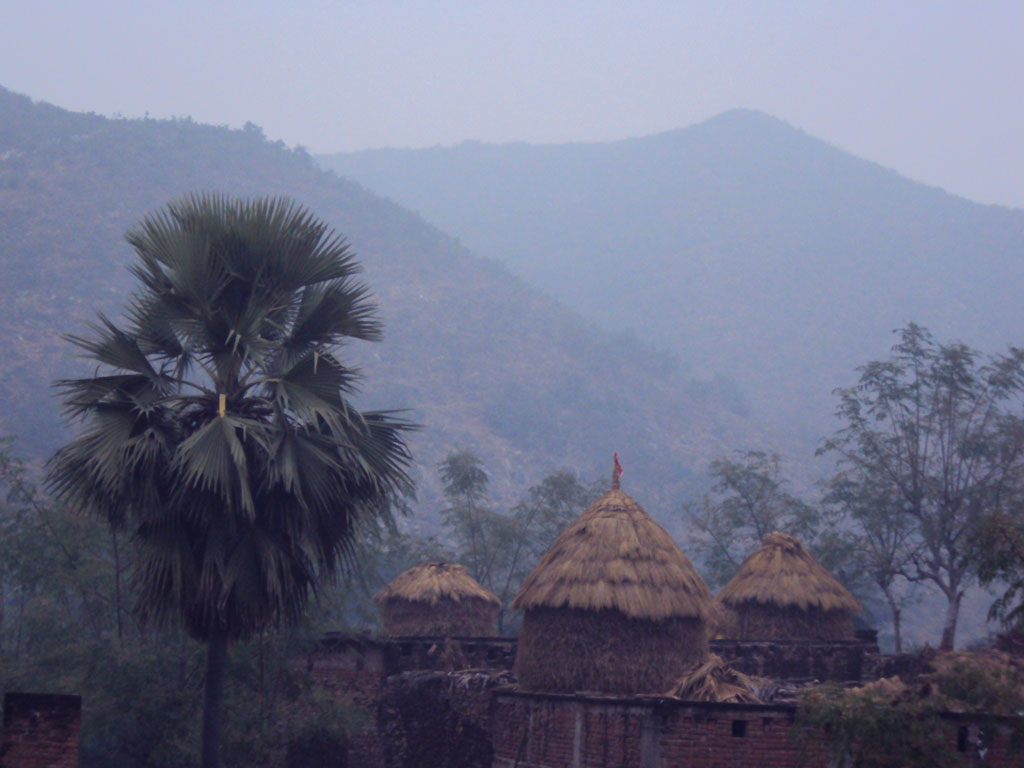
typical winter in Nawada

=== Nawada sub-division ===
1. Hisua – Bagodar, Chhatihar, Chitarghati, Dhanwa, Dona, Eknar, Hadsa, Hisua Nagar Panchayat, Kaithir, Pachra, Sonsa, Tekpur, Tungi
2. Warisaliganj –Gopalpur, Makanpur, Apsarh, Baghi Bardiha, Pakribarawan, Chakwae, Dosut, Hajipur, Kochgawn, Kumbhi, Kutri, Manjaur, Masudha, Mohiuddin Pur, Mosima, Naromurar, Paingari, Gorapar, Saur, Shahpur, Thera, Warisaliganj Nagar Panchayat, Maafi, Simri, May, Chainpur, Chandipur, Balyari, Baali, Bilaari.
3. Nawada – Bhadauni, Akauna Minhai, Amthi, Bhadokhra, Bhagwanpur, Didaur, Gonawa, Jamuawa, Patwa Sarai, Gopal Ganj, Jhunathi, Kharant, Loharpura, Mahuli, Nanaura, Nawada Nagar Parishad, Oraina, Paura, Kadirganj, Samai, Sonsiahri
4. Kawakol – Chhabail, Darawa, Debnagar, Kawakol, Kebali, Khadshari, Lalpur, Mahudar, Manjhila, Nawadaih, Paharpur, Pali, Pandegangot, Saroni, Shekhodewra
5. Nardiganj – Dohra, Handiya, Ichua Karna, Kahuara, Kosla, Masaurha, Nardiganj, Nanaura, Odo, Parma, Pesh
6. Kashichak – Parwati, Revera, Jagdishpur, Chandinama, Khakhari, Belar, Birnawa, Subhanpur, Derhgaon, Sarkatti
7. Pakari Barawan – Belkhunda, Budhaul, Dioura, Okaura, Dewdha, Dhodha, Dumrawan, Dumari, Lilo, Sundari, Aruri, Jiuri, Kewala, Kunanpur, Pakri Barawan, Poksi

=== Rajauli sub-division ===
1. Akbarpur – Baksanda, Baliya Buzurg, Barail, Barew, Bhanail, Bhudhuwa, Fattehpur, Gobind Bigha, Kulna, Ladaha, Malikpur, Rajhat Sharif Nemdarganj, Mankhar, Pachgawan, Pachrukhi, Paijuna, Panti, Parto Karahri, Pharaha, Sakarpura, Diri
2. Narhat – Babhnaur, Jamuara, Khanwa, Konibar, Narhat, Pali Kurd, Punaul, Punthar, Saidapur Goasa, Shekhpura
3. Meskaur – Akri Pandebigha, Barat, Barosar, Biju Bigha, Meskaur, Mairzapur,Merhkuri Pasarhi, Rasulpur, Saraye, Tetariya, Mahugay
4. Sirdala – Abdul, Akauna, Bandhi, Bargawan, Chaube, Chaukia, Dhiraundh, Ghaghat, Khalkhu, Khanpura, Khatangi, Laund, Rajan, Sanrh Majhgawn, Sirdala, Upardih
5. Rajauli – Amawa East, Amawa West, Andharbari, Bahadurpur, Chitarkoli, Dhamni, Hardiya, Jogya Maran, Lengura, Murhena, Parka Buzurg, Rajauli Nagar Panchayat, Sawaiya Tand, Sirodabar, Takua Tand
6. Govindpur – Baksoti, Baniya Bigha, Budhwara, Madhopur, Bisunpur, Bhawanpur, Delhua, Sarkanda, Sughri, Govindpur
7. Roh – Nazardih, Ohari, [marui panchayat( famous village- sundra)]

Nawada also has 5 Assembly constituencies: Nawada, Hisua, Rajauli, Gobindpur and Warisaliganj.

== Economy ==
The main crops harvested in the district are paddy, wheat, pulses, and vegetables. Industrial facilities in the district include bidi factories and silk handlooms. Formerly, sugar cane farming and processing also took place; the district's single sugar mill, located in Warisaliganj, is currently non-functional. Kadirganj, located 6 km from Nawada, has a small scale (Handloom Silk) Industry where more than 100 weavers families involved in weaving handloom silk clothes.

Rajauli Hisua and Warsaliganj are emerging as significant market hubs for the hinterland regions bordering Jharkhand state, and have also produced many professionals including physicians, surgeons, engineers who are working in many parts of India. The Nuclear Power Corporation of India identified Rajauli as the possible site for creating an additional 2,800 MW of nuclear power capacity in the state.

In 2006 the Ministry of Panchayati Raj named Nawada one of the country's 250 most backward districts. It is one of the 38 districts in Bihar currently receiving funds from the Backward Regions Grant Fund Programme (BRGF).

== Transport ==
National Highway 20 runs roughly north–south through the western side of district, serving many villages and towns, including the administrative center of Nawada. National Highway 120 follows a 30 km route in the far northwestern corner of the district, passing through the town of Hisua. Including state highways and other routes connecting villages, the district has approximately 420 km of paved roads. Deluxe buses are available from Nawada to cities like Patna, Bihar Shariff, Bodh Gaya, Rajgir, Koderma and major cities Patna, Kolkata, Ranchi, Bokaro, Jamshedpur etc.

The district lies in the East Central Railway of Indian Railways; the Gaya–Kiul line crosses the district roughly east–west, and connects with the Bakhtiyarpur–Tilaiya line at Tilaiya Junction. Two express trains and several local trains run on the Gaya-Kiul line via Nawada railway station. Though electrification is complete, doubling of railway line is under process. This would provide alternative route for Kolkata and North-East bound trains and would enhance passenger services and freight trains. Currently a Delhi bound train is already scheduled and running from Godda to New Delhi and vice versa has halt at Nawada railway station.

== Demographics ==
Historical population
Year	Pop.	±% p.a.
1901	412,119	—
1911	431,938	+0.47%
1921	430,323	−0.04%
1931	477,400	+1.04%
1941	554,733	+1.51%
1951	613,724	+1.02%
1961	741,633	+1.91%
1971	893,937	+1.89%
1981	1,099,177	+2.09%
1991	1,359,694	+2.15%
2001	1,809,696	+2.90%
2011	2,219,146	+2.06%

Religions in Nawada district (2011)
Religion	Percent
Hinduism	88.53%
Islam	11.01%
Other or not stated	0.46%

According to the 2011 census Nawada district has a population of 2,219,146, roughly equal to the nation of Latvia or the US state of New Mexico. This gives it a ranking of 205th in India (out of a total of 640). The district has a population density of 889 inhabitants per square kilometre (2,300/sq mi). Its population growth rate over the decade 2001-2011 was 22.49%. Nawada had a sex ratio of 936 females for every 1000 males, and a literacy rate of 61.63%. 9.71% of the population lives in urban areas. Scheduled Castes and Scheduled Tribes make up 25.47% and 0.09% of the population respectively.

Languages in Nawada district (2011)
1. Magahi (55.5%)
2. Hindi (36.6%)
3. Urdu (7.57%)
4. Others (0.27%)

At the time of the 2011 Census of India, 55.52% of the population in the district spoke Magahi, 36.64% Hindi and 7.57% Urdu as their first language.

== Politics ==
District	No.	Constituency	Name	Party	Alliance	Remarks
Nawada	235	Rajauli (SC)	Vimala Rajvanshi	LJP(RV)	NDA	
Nawada	236	Hisua	Anil Singh	BJP	NDA	
Nawada	237	Nawada	Vibha Devi Yadav	JD(U)	NDA	
Nawada	238	Gobindpur	Binita Mehta	LJP(RV)	NDA	
Nawada	239	Warsaliganj	Anita Mahto	RJD	MGB	

== Education ==
There are numerous institution for Higher education and secondary education.

=== Higher educational institutes ===
- KLS College, Nawada
- TS College, Hisua
- Shree Krishna Memorial College, Nawada
- Krishak college dheodha .
- S N Sinha college, Warisaliganj
- SGBK Sahu senior secondary school Warisaliganj
- Mahila college warisaliganj
- National school mafi warisaliganj
- Warsi College Pandeygangout Kawakol, Nawada
- RMW College, Nawada
- Seth Sagarmal College
- Sita Ram Sahu College, Nawada
- Ram lakhan Singh Yadav College, Nawada
- Triveni College of Education, Nawada
- Swami Sahjanand Saraswati Sanskrit College, Nawada
- Ganauri Ramkali Teacher's Training College, Nawada
- Nawada Vidhi Mahavidyalaya
- Ravikant Punam B.Ed college Dosut Warsaliganj, Nawada
- Government Engineering college Nawada
- Government polytechnic College Khanawa Narhat Nawada

=== Secondary educational institutes ===
*

- RPS Convent Public School, Nawada
- Dayal Public School, Nawada
- High School Merhkuri, Nawada
- Jawahar Navodaya Vidyalaya, Rewar, Nawada
- High School Aanti, Kadirganj, Nawada
- Gyan Bharti Model Residential Complex, Hisua
- Modern English School, Nawada
- Manas Bharti Educational Complex, Nawada
- Jeevan Jyoti Public School, Nawada
- Gyan Bharti Public School, Nawada
- Jeevan Deep Public School, Nawada
- Gyan Bharti Public School, Pakribarawan, Nawada
- St. Joseph's School, Nawada
- The Diksha School, Nawada
- Delhi Public School, Nawada
- Momin High School, par Nawada
- Gandhi Inter School, Nawada
- Bless International School (CBSE 10+2 Arts, Science & Commerce), Nawada
- Iraqui Urdu Girls School (10+2), Ansar Nagar, Nawada
- Unique Public School, Nawada

•High school sundra, marui, nawada (inaugurated digitally by cm nitish kumar)

== Tourism ==
Nawada district has its own tourism splendour and has the potential to develop as a tourist destination. In the town's immediate surroundings, there are various points of interest. The Kakolat Waterfall (24 km from town), Sankat Mochan Mandir and the Sekho Devra Ashram are among them (Sarvodaya Ashram was established here in Kowakole block by Jaiprakash Narayan and inaugurated by Dr. Rajendra Prasad), Baba Majaar and Hanuman Temple (located on NH 31, a shrine of Hazrat Saiyyad Shah Jalaluddin Bukhari and a Hanuman temple), Jarra Baba (found in Sirdalla), Hanuman Mandir (located in Kendua village), and Maa Bageshwari Mandir (located in Kendua village) (located in Jamuawa, in 3 km of Jamui road of Nawada in side of Sakri River).

== See also ==
- Gaya
- Patna
- Begusarai
- Lakhisarai
