= Meskaur =

- Subdivision
- Location in Bihar, India
- Coordinates: 24°46′13″N 85°20′04″E
- Country: India
- State: Bihar
- District: Nawada
- Sub-division: Rajauli

Government
  - Type: Zila Parishad

Population
  - Total: 94,528
- Postal code: 805122

Meskaur is a block of Nawada district located in southern Nawada.
