= Nawada =

City in Bihar, India

- City
- Location in Bihar, India
- Coordinates: 24°53′12″N 85°32′36″E
- Country: India
- State: Bihar
- Region: Magadh
- District: Nawada
- Ward: 44 wards

Government
  - Type: Municipal Governance in India
  - Body: Nawada Municipality
- Elevation: 80 m (260 ft)

Population (2011)
  - Total: 80,740
- Demonym: Nawadian

Languages
  - Official: Hindi, English, Urdu, Magahi
- Time zone: UTC+5:30 (IST)
- PIN: 805110, 805111 (Nawada)
- Telephone code: 06324
- ISO 3166 code: IN-BR
- Vehicle registration: BR-27
- Sex ratio: 1.14 ♂/♀
- Website: nawada.nic.in

Nawada is a town and a municipality in Bihar, India. It is also the Headquarters of the Nawada district. It is situated on both sides of the Khuri River at 24º 53’ N and 85º 33’ E. The name evolved from Nau-abad, meaning the new town. In 1845, it was established as a Subdivision of Gaya district. On 26 January 1973, Nawada was formed as a separate district from Gaya district. It is a part of Magadh Division.

== Geography ==
Nawada is located at 24.88°N 85.53°E. It has an average elevation of 80 metres (260 ft). The city is divided into two blocks by the Khuri River, the left bank being the older section, while the right bank is the modern section with public offices, a sub-jail, dispensary, and schools.

== Demographics ==
According to the 2011 census, Nawada City has a population of 180,740. Nawada has a ratio of 957 females for every 1,000 males. The average literacy rate is 74%, higher than the national average of 63.5%: male literacy is 81%, and female literacy is 67%. In Nawada, 17% of the population is under 6 years of age. Hindi, Magahi and Urdu are the main languages spoken in the area.

Railway Stations -

=== Rail network ===
The main line of Gaya-Kiul railway section passes through Nawada. Nawadah (Nawada Railway Station), important railway station of the city. On September 29, 2025, Nawada was directly connected to Patna Junction (PNBE) via Sheikhpura (SHK), Bihar Sharif (BEHS), Daniyawan (DHWN), and Jatdumri Junction (JTDM).

Currently you can reach nawada by following route

1. Patna Junction (PNBE)→ Nawadah Station (NWD)
2. Varanasi Junction (BSB) → Nawadah Station (NWD)
3. Lucknow Junction (LKO) → Nawadah Station (NWD)
4. Howrah Junction (HWH) → Nawadah Station (NWD)
5. Malda Town Junction (MLDT) → Nawadah Station (NWD)
6. Kamakhya Junction (KYQ) → Nawadah Station (NWD)

Patna Railway Station → Gaya Railway Station → Nawadah

1. New Delhi → Kanpur Central → Prayagraj Jn. → Pt. Deen Dayal Upadhyaya Jn. → Sasaram → Gaya Jn. → Nawadah

=== Road network ===
From Patliputra Bus Terminal, Patna (Bairiya Bus Stand) or Gandhi Maidan Bus Stand, Patna to Nawada Bus Stand via NH 20.

From Gaya through NH 120 & SH 8 (Bihar)

=== Air ===
By air, Nawada is well connected to several airports of Bihar, Jharkhand and West Bengal:

1. Gaya Airport 69 kilometres (43 mi)
2. Lok Nayak Jayaprakash Airport, Patna 123 kilometres (76 mi)
3. Birsa Munda Airport, Ranchi 224 kilometres (139 mi)
4. Netaji Subhas Chandra Bose International Airport, Kolkata 445 kilometres (277 mi)
5. Deoghar Airport 167 kilometres (103.769 mi)

== Educational Institute ==
This town has some good educational institutes like Government Engineering College, Nawada Vidhi Mahavidyalaya, Rajendra Memorial Women's (RMW) College, Kanhai Lal Sahu (KLS) College.

Schools:- St. Joseph's School, Jeevan Jyoti Public School, Modern English School, Gyan Bharti School, R.P.S.Convent Public School, Delhi Public School, The Diksha School, SHEMROCK Child Care, Bodhie Tree International School.

== Notable People ==
Ranjan Shaw is an environmentalist and Nature conservationist brought up in Jalapur Village of this district. He is the first Reseach Scholar from here who works in Botanical Survey of India.
