= Sonwarsa Halt railway station =

Railway station in Bihar

Sonwarsa Halt

General information
- Location: Warisaliganj-Kashichak Road, Gamhirpur Sonbarsa, Nawada district, Bihar; India
- Coordinates: 25.0436°N 85.669157°E
- Elevation: 69 metres (226 ft)
- System: Passenger train Station
- Owner: Indian Railways
- Line: Gaya–Kiul line
- Platforms: 1
- Tracks: 2

Construction
- Structure type: Standard (on-ground station)

Other information
- Status: Functioning
- Station code: SONW
- Zone(s): East Central Railway zone
- Division(s): Danapur

History
- Opened: 1879; 147 years ago
- Electrified: 2018
- Former names: East Indian Railway

Services
Preceding station	Indian Railways	Following station
Warisaliganj towards ?	East Central Railway zone Gaya–Kiul line	Baghi Ghauspur Halt towards ?
Location

Sonwarsa Halt railway station (station code: SONW), is a halt railway station on Gaya–Kiul line of Delhi–Kolkata Main Line in East Central Railway zone under Danapur railway division of the Indian Railways. The railway station is situated beside Warisaliganj-Kashichak Road, Gamhirpur Sonbarsa in Nawada district in the Indian state of Bihar.
