= Kutri =

- Village
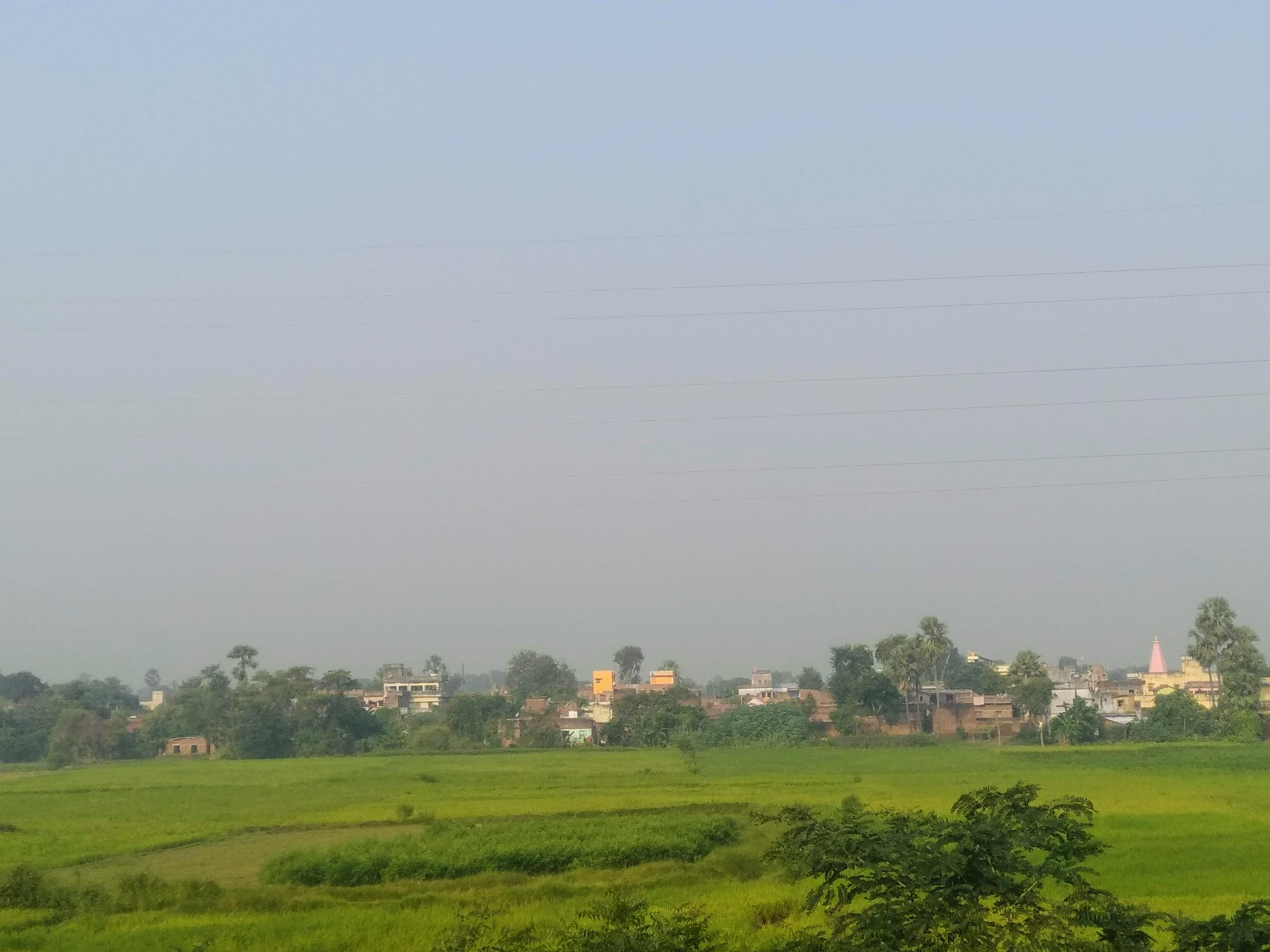
- Panorama View of Kutri

- Location in Bihar, India Kutri (India)
- Coordinates: 25.023060°N 85.602250°E
- Country: India
- State: Bihar
- District: Nawada

Government
  - Type: Panchayati raj (India)
  - Body: Gram panchayat

Population (2011)
  - Total: 5,445

Languages
  - Official: Hindi
- Time zone: UTC+5:30 (IST)
- Postal Index Number: 805130
- Telephone code: 06325
- Vehicle registration: BR-27-XXXX
- Website: nawada.nic.in

Kutri Village (Census of India Village-code 257586) is located in the Warisaliganj Block of Nawada district in Bihar, India. It is a historical village among 80 villages of Warisaliganj Block of Nawada district. According to government records, Kutri village has 842 houses spread over a geographical area of 368 hectares. It is situated 5 km away from the Warisaliganj Block and 22 km away from Nawada. As of 2009, Kutri village was designated a gram panchayat.

== Kutri gram panchayat ==
The gram panchayat is a "village of temples" and the villagers venerate Aadi Shakti, Maa Kali, and Shiva. The largest pond by the southwest corner of the temple to Shiva in the village is a reminder of the village as the historical symbol of Kashi City. The village was a prominent place of Hindu dharma in ancient ages.

Kutri Panchayat consists of the following villages: Kutri, Naromurar, Khirbhojna, and Rampur

Kutri is a Magadh village that is 120 km away from Bihar state's capital city Patna and approximately 20 km from Rajgriha, a capital city during the Magadh dynasty. In the era of the Magadh Dynasty, the administration was strong and the village had a local chief known as the gramakas. Its administration was divided into executive, judiciary, and military divisions. In the Mughal & British era during the Zamindari system, a similar form of administration called kachahari (A tax collection and judiciary system) was practiced in Naromurar—a village of Kutri Panchayat and was headed by Zamindar under Mahalwari system of the British empire. Therefore, ancient Kutri villages were equipped with a systematic administration system but also surrounded by various historical and tourist centres such as Rajgrih, Nalanda, Pawapuri, Kakolat, Silao, Gaya, and Patliputra. Its presence in the centre of these places makes it a good tourist centre with the importance of reminding intact of Hindu religion while the region was undergoing a transition of religious belief from Vedic Ahinsa parmo dharma. Buddhism and Jainism flourished in this region during ancient times with Nalanda University was the centre of education during the Magadh & contemporary Gupta empire, which was a Brahmin dynasty. Kutri has five sub-villages: Naromurar, Khirbhojna, Rampur, Tullapur, and Masankhama. Kutri & Naromurar inhabitants are Bhumihar, Brahmins and Maithil Brahmins.

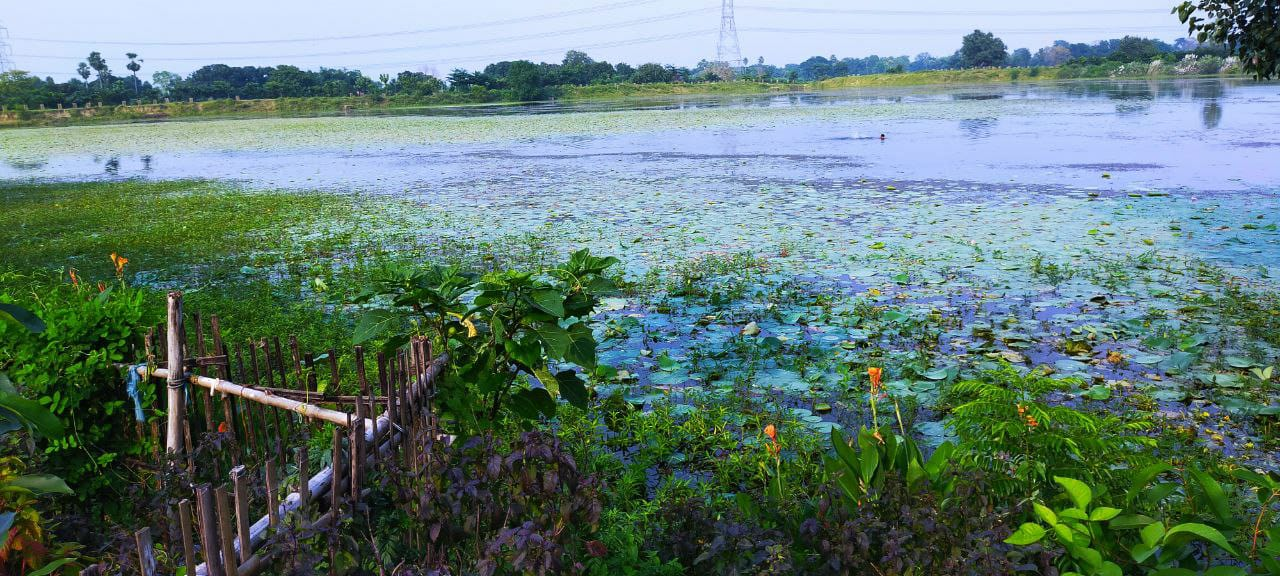
The lotus bud emerges from the pond of Kutri village

=== Language ===
The primary languages used in Kutri are Magahiin the Nawada District and Hindiin Magadh Division of Bihar.

Temples of Kutri Village
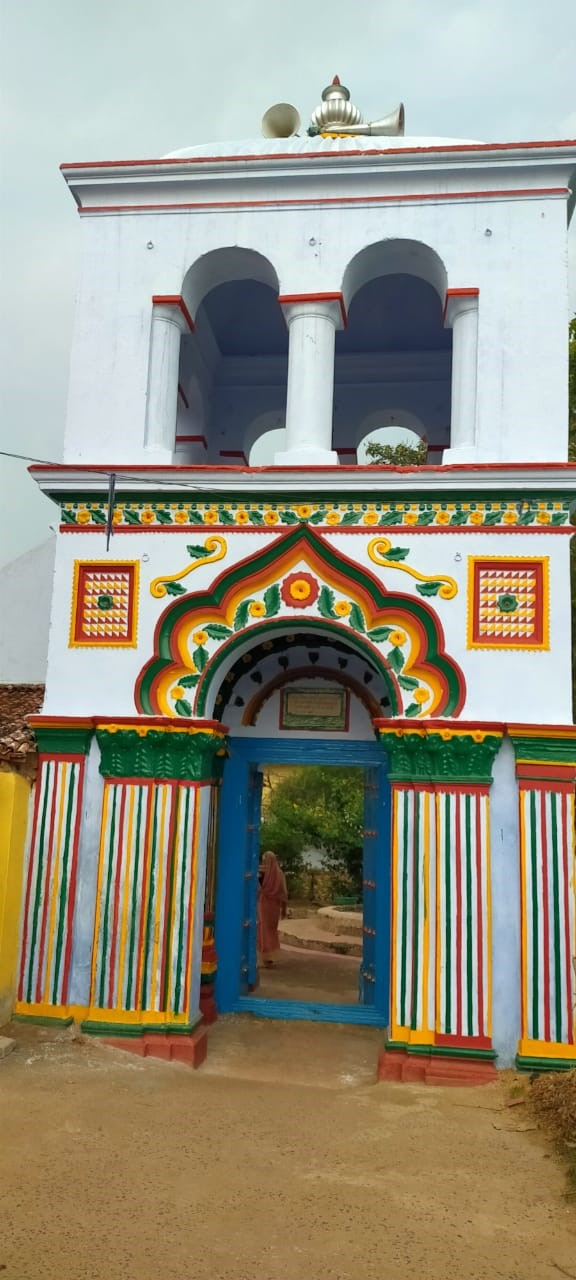
Shivala entry Gate

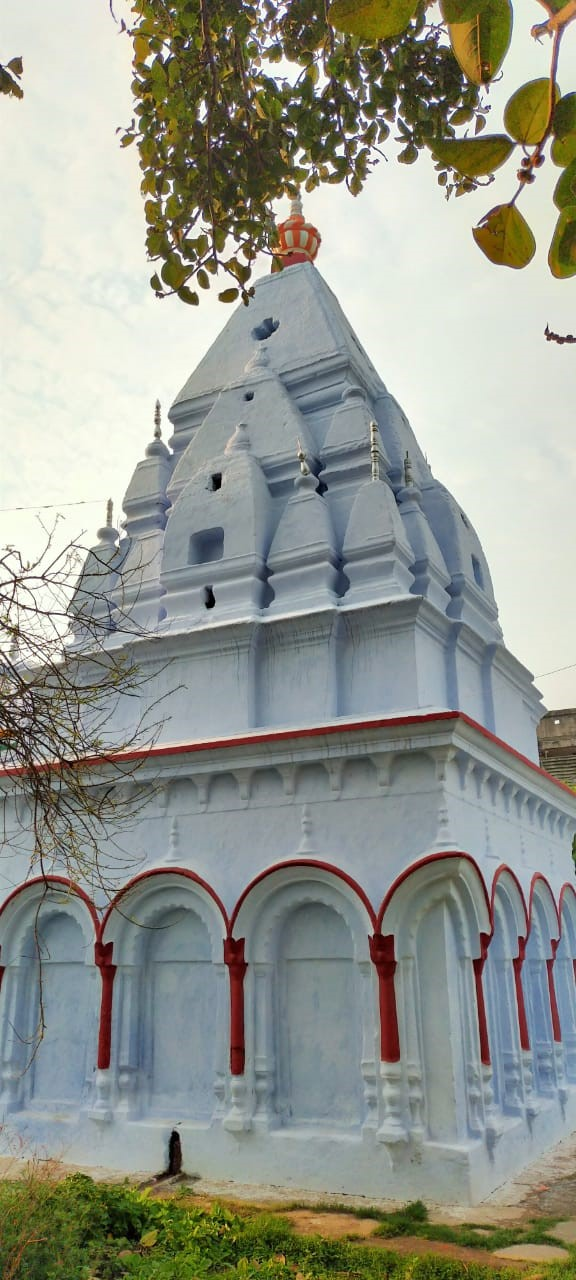
Shivala rear view

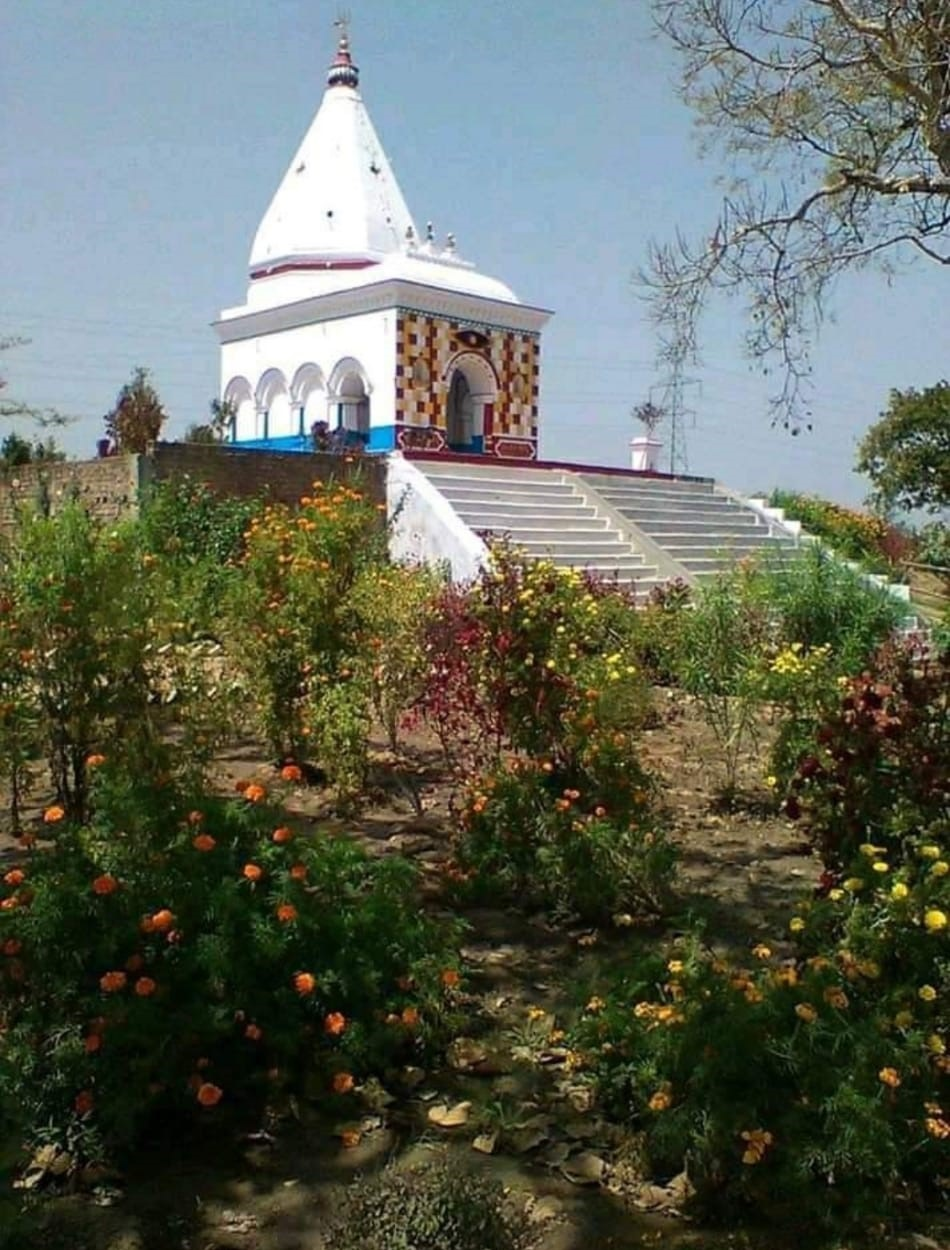
Shiva Mandir near the pond at Kutri

== Geography ==
=== Climate ===
The table below shows historical monthly averages for climate variables in Kutri.

Climate data for Patna Airport (1981–2010, extremes 1951–2012)
Month	Jan	Feb	Mar	Apr	May	Jun	Jul	Aug	Sep	Oct	Nov	Dec	Year
Record high °C (°F)	30.0 (86.0)	35.1 (95.2)	41.4 (106.5)	44.6 (112.3)	45.6 (114.1)	46.6 (115.9)	41.2 (106.2)	39.7 (103.5)	37.5 (99.5)	37.2 (99.0)	34.1 (93.4)	30.5 (86.9)	46.6 (115.9)
Mean daily maximum °C (°F)	22.4 (72.3)	26.0 (78.8)	32.2 (90.0)	37.0 (98.6)	37.4 (99.3)	36.4 (97.5)	33.0 (91.4)	32.9 (91.2)	32.5 (90.5)	31.9 (89.4)	29.0 (84.2)	24.5 (76.1)	31.3 (88.3)
Mean daily minimum °C (°F)	9.3 (48.7)	12.1 (53.8)	16.7 (62.1)	22.1 (71.8)	25.1 (77.2)	26.7 (80.1)	26.3 (79.3)	26.3 (79.3)	25.5 (77.9)	21.5 (70.7)	15.1 (59.2)	10.5 (50.9)	19.8 (67.6)
Record low °C (°F)	1.4 (34.5)	3.4 (38.1)	8.2 (46.8)	13.3 (55.9)	17.7 (63.9)	19.3 (66.7)	21.1 (70.0)	20.5 (68.9)	19.0 (66.2)	12.0 (53.6)	7.7 (45.9)	2.2 (36.0)	1.4 (34.5)
Average rainfall mm (inches)	11.1 (0.44)	14.0 (0.55)	9.5 (0.37)	12.7 (0.50)	43.7 (1.72)	162.5 (6.40)	354.4 (13.95)	277.8 (10.94)	197.7 (7.78)	49.1 (1.93)	7.2 (0.28)	6.1 (0.24)	1,145.8 (45.11)
Average rainy days	1.2	1.3	0.7	1.0	2.9	6.9	14.3	12.5	9.5	2.9	0.5	0.6	54.2
Average relative humidity (%) (at 17:30 IST)	65	52	37	32	42	59	75	75	76	68	67	69	60
Mean monthly sunshine hours	207.7	228.8	260.4	264.0	272.8	192.0	130.2	151.9	162.0	238.7	240.0	201.5	2,550
Mean daily sunshine hours	6.7	8.1	8.4	8.8	8.8	6.4	4.2	4.9	5.4	7.7	8.0	6.5	7.0
Source: India Meteorological Department (sun 1971–2000)

== Education ==
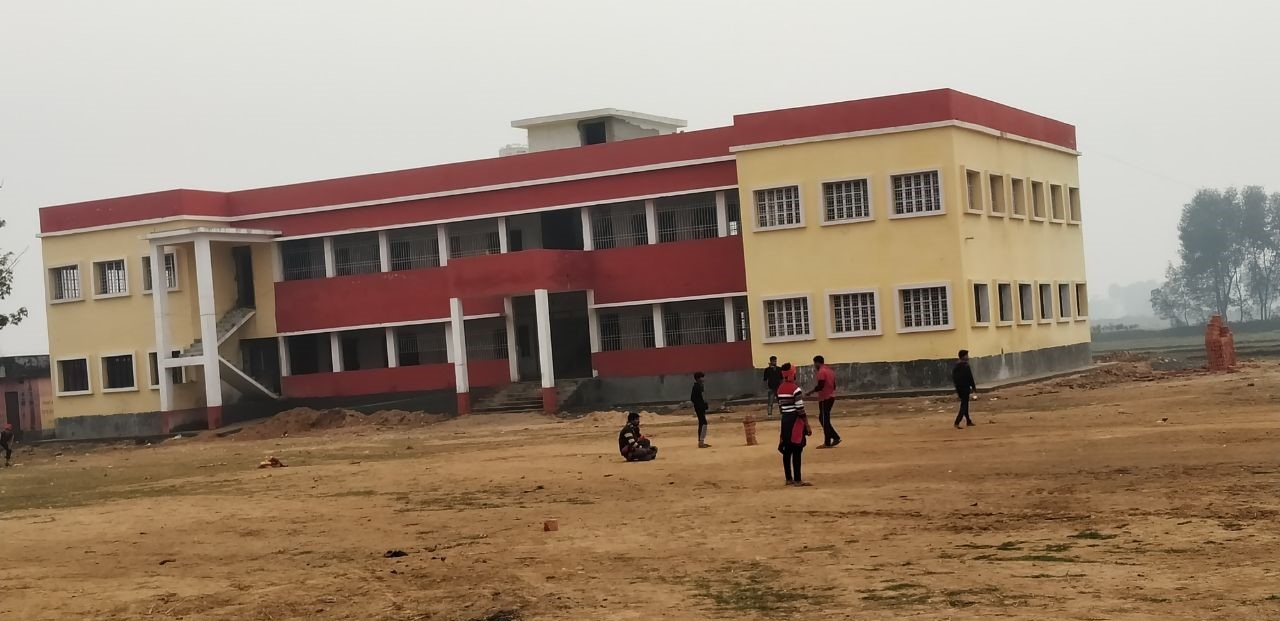
High School at Kutri

As a Magadha Empire village, Kutri has had Vedic education and the judiciary system in ancient times. Nalanda University, an Indian educational institution, is situated near Kutri. During the British Raj, school education started in the 1900s with the establishment of Middle School Kutri in the north of the village. Siya Saran Singh – a teacher of Kochgaon, contributed in proliferating education in Kutri. With Harvansh Kumari's support, they built a primary school of 3 rooms during the Zamindari system. The school was later extended to middle school up to class 7. After Indian independence, Kutri villagers began to attend the BK Sahoo High School at Warisaliganj. It was decided in Oct 1972 during the Durga Puja Festival that a high school was required. It was difficult for girls to get higher education due to the unavailability of high school in nearby locations. In December 1978, Kutri High School became a government-approved high school and is now an inter-high school. Apart from this, there were some coaching classes run privately. Currently, there is one middle school and one inter-high school in the village where students from nearby villages including Naromurar, Gorapar, Lohrajpur and Paingari, come for education.

== See also ==
- Villages in Bihar
- Nawada District
