= Derhgaon Halt railway station =

Railway station in Bihar

Derhgaon Halt

General information
- Location: Warisaliganj-Barbigha Road, Dergaon, Nawada district, Bihar; India
- Coordinates: 25.088974°N 85.751319°E
- Elevation: 57 metres (187 ft)
- System: Passenger train Station
- Owner: Indian Railways
- Line: Gaya–Kiul line
- Platforms: 1
- Tracks: 2

Construction
- Structure type: Standard (on-ground station)

Other information
- Status: Functioning
- Station code: DGNH
- Zone(s): East Central Railway zone
- Division(s): Danapur

History
- Opened: 1879; 147 years ago
- Electrified: 2018
- Former names: East Indian Railway

Services
| Preceding station | Indian Railways | Following station |
|---|---|---|
| Kashi Chak towards ? | East Central Railway zone Gaya–Kiul line | Kusumha Bihar Halt towards ? |
Location

Derhgaon Halt railway station (station code: DGNH), is a halt railway station on Gaya–Kiul line of Delhi–Kolkata Main Line in East Central Railway zone under Danapur railway division of the Indian Railways. The railway station is situated beside Warisaliganj-Barbigha Road at Dergaon in Nawada district, in the Indian state of Bihar.
