= Manpur (community development block) =

Community development block in Gaya district, Bihar, India

Manpur Manpur
- town
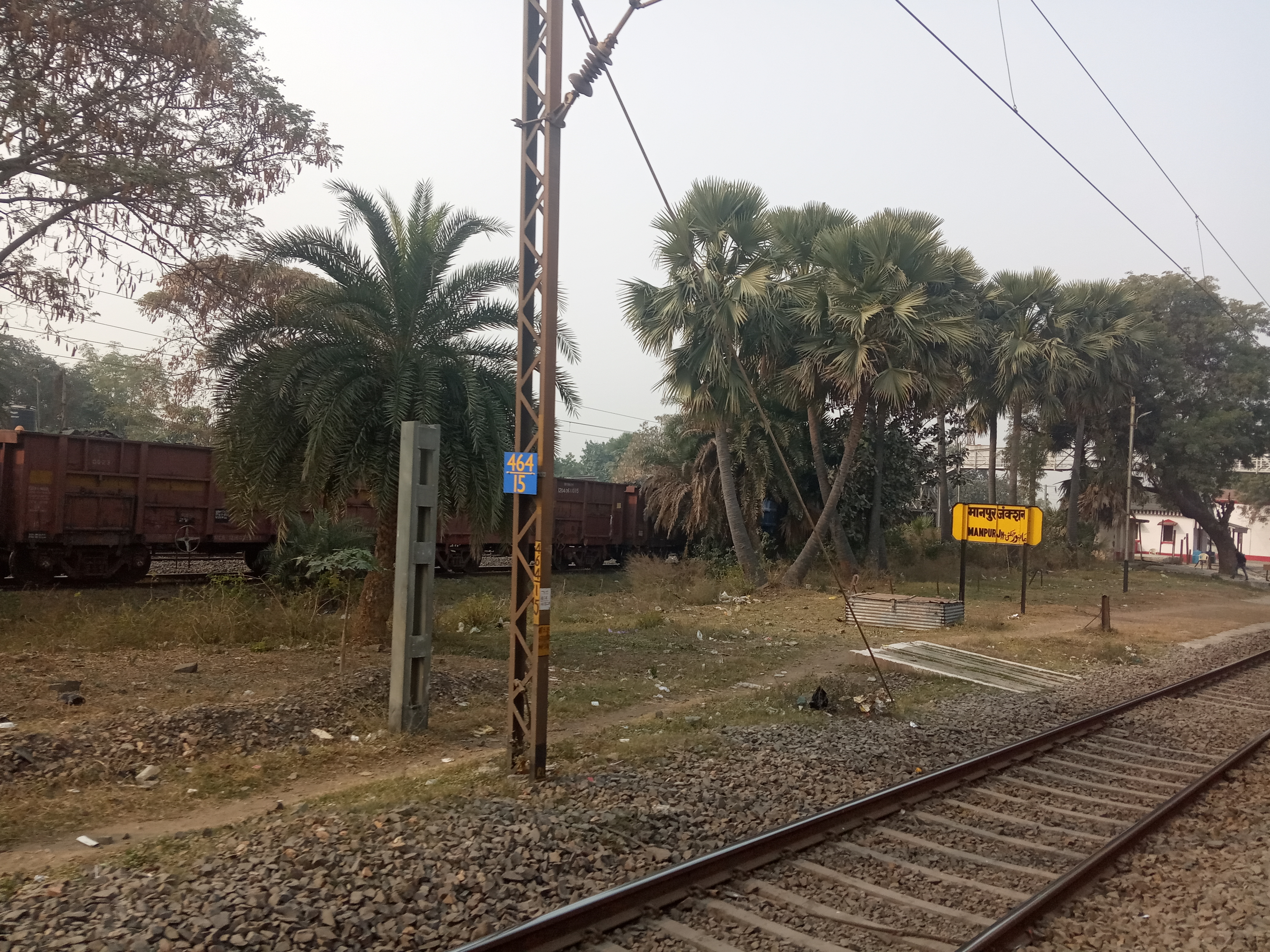
- Manpur junction railway station
- Nickname: Manchester of Eastern India
- Location in Bihar, India
- Coordinates: 24.82°N 85.03°E
- Country: India
- State: Bihar
- District: Gaya
- Founder: Man Singh I
- Named for: Man Singh I

Government
  - Type: Municipality under a large Municipal Corporation
  - Body: Nagar Palika under Gaya Municipal Corporation

Languages
  - Official: Magahi, Hindi
- Time zone: UTC+5:30 (IST)
- PIN: 823003
- Telephone code: 0631
- Nearest city: Gaya
- Lok Sabha constituency: Gaya Lok Sabha constituency
- Vidhan Sabha constituency: Gaya Town Constituency

Manpur is a major suburban town located in the metropolis city of Gaya in the state of Bihar India. The town is known for its handloom and railroad tie factory. It is situated on the banks of the Phalgu river. The main market is known as 'Manpur Bazaar'. The main occupation of the people are business and handloom weaving Weaving of clothes through hand loom and power loom is done mainly in Patwatoli.

Patwatoli, a muhalla in Manpur, has produced many IITians almost 20 each year to the Indian Institutes of Technology and about every house has an engineer. Now these days, students are opting other streams too like Law, UPSC, SSC, Medical etc. Due to higher education in Patwatoli, child marriage is about to end and girls are also going out for higher education.

== History ==
There is also a very ancient temple of Lord Sun in Manpur named as Surya Temple, which is situated on the bank of a pond. The Surya Temple was established around 400 years ago by Raja Man Singh, an army chief of the Mughal Emperor Akbar as well as king of Amer. Raja Man Singh, during his campaign to quell Bengal riots, established Manpur; that's why it is named as Man-pur. Patwatoli, near the Shiv Mandir, Sri Ram Nagar, Durga Asthan and Shivcharan Lane, has the highest number of power looms installed. There are almost 5000- 8000 power looms set up.

Manpur is also famous for Diwali and almost hundreds of statues of Goddess Lakshmi, Lord Ganesha and Goddess Saraswati are worshipped and decorated on the occasion of Diwali. People from all over Gaya come out of their houses in Diwali to see the very well decorated statues. On 2nd day of Diwali people roam around the patwatoli for Pandal Hopping.

== Transport ==
Manpur is connected by train with various cities of Bihar. The nearest big station is Gaya junction. Nearest two station namely Manpur Junction and Shaheed Ishwar Chowdhary Halt railway station is situated on Gaya–Kiul line.
