= Baghi Bardiha railway station =

Railway station in Bihar

Baghi Bardiha

General information
- Location: State Highway 83, Milki, Baghi Bardiha, Nawada district, Bihar; India
- Coordinates: 24.953077°N 85.623332°E
- Elevation: 85 metres (279 ft)
- System: Passenger train Station
- Owner: Indian Railways
- Line: Gaya–Kiul line
- Platforms: 1
- Tracks: 2

Construction
- Structure type: Standard (on-ground station)

Other information
- Status: Functioning
- Station code: BBE
- Zone(s): East Central Railway zone
- Division(s): Danapur

History
- Opened: 1879; 147 years ago
- Electrified: 2018
- Former names: East Indian Railway

Services
Preceding station	Indian Railways	Following station
Sadipur Halt towards ?	East Central Railway zone Gaya–Kiul line	Warisaliganj towards ?
Location

Baghi Bardiha railway station is a railway station on Gaya–Kiul line of Delhi–Kolkata Main Line in East Central Railway zone under Danapur railway division of the Indian Railways. The railway station is situated beside State Highway 83 at Milki, Baghi Bardiha in Nawada district in the Indian state of Bihar.
