= Sadipur Halt railway station =

Railway station in Bihar

Sadipur Halt

General information
- Location: Sadipur Road, Kadir Ganj, Nawada district, Bihar; India
- Coordinates: 24.932654°N 85.596052°E
- Elevation: 85 metres (279 ft)
- System: Passenger train Station
- Owner: Indian Railways
- Line: Gaya–Kiul line
- Platforms: 1
- Tracks: 2

Construction
- Structure type: Standard (on-ground station)

Other information
- Status: Functioning
- Station code: XSAD
- Zone(s): East Central Railway zone
- Division(s): Danapur

History
- Opened: 1879; 147 years ago
- Electrified: 2018
- Former names: East Indian Railway

Services
Preceding station	Indian Railways	Following station
Nawada towards ?	East Central Railway zone Gaya–Kiul line	Baghi Bardiha towards ?
Location

Sadipur Halt railway station (station code: XSAD), is a halt railway station on the Gaya–Kiul line of Delhi–Kolkata Main Line in the East Central Railway zone under the Danapur railway division of the Indian Railways. The railway station is situated beside Sadipur Road at Kadir Ganj in the Nawada district in the Indian state of Bihar.
