= Karjara railway station =

Railway station in Bihar

Karjara

General information
- Location: Karjara, Gaya district, Bihar; India
- Coordinates: 24.808297°N 85.151844°E
- Elevation: 116 metres (381 ft)
- System: Passenger train Station
- Owner: Indian Railways
- Line: Gaya–Kiul line
- Platforms: 2
- Tracks: 2

Construction
- Structure type: Standard (on-ground station)

Other information
- Status: Functioning
- Station code: KRJR
- Zone(s): East Central Railway zone
- Division(s): Danapur

History
- Opened: 1879; 147 years ago
- Electrified: 2018
- Former names: East Indian Railway

Services
Preceding station	Indian Railways	Following station
Paimar towards ?	East Central Railway zone Gaya–Kiul line	Kolhana Halt towards ?
Location

Karjara railway station (station code: KRJR), is a railway station on Gaya–Kiul line of Delhi–Kolkata Main Line in East Central Railway zone under Danapur railway division of the Indian Railways. The railway station is situated at Karjara in Gaya district in the Indian state of Bihar.
