= Pura Halt railway station =

Railway station in Bihar

Pura Halt

General information
- Location: State Highway 8, Partabpur, Gaya district, Bihar; India
- Coordinates: 24.813122°N 85.225637°E
- Elevation: 109 metres (358 ft)
- System: Passenger train Station
- Owner: Indian Railways
- Line: Gaya–Kiul line
- Platforms: 1
- Tracks: 2

Construction
- Structure type: Standard (on-ground station)

Other information
- Status: Functioning
- Station code: PAHB
- Zone(s): East Central Railway zone
- Division(s): Danapur

History
- Opened: 1879; 147 years ago
- Electrified: 2018
- Former names: East Indian Railway

Services
Preceding station	Indian Railways	Following station
Wazerganj towards ?	East Central Railway zone Gaya–Kiul line	Jamuawan towards ?
Location

Pura Halt railway station (station code: PAHB), is a halt railway station on Gaya–Kiul line of Delhi–Kolkata Main Line in East Central Railway zone under Danapur railway division of the Indian Railways. The railway station is situated beside State Highway 8 at Partabpur in Gaya district in the Indian state of Bihar.
