= Manpur Junction railway station =

Railway station in Gaya, Bihar, India

Manpur Junction
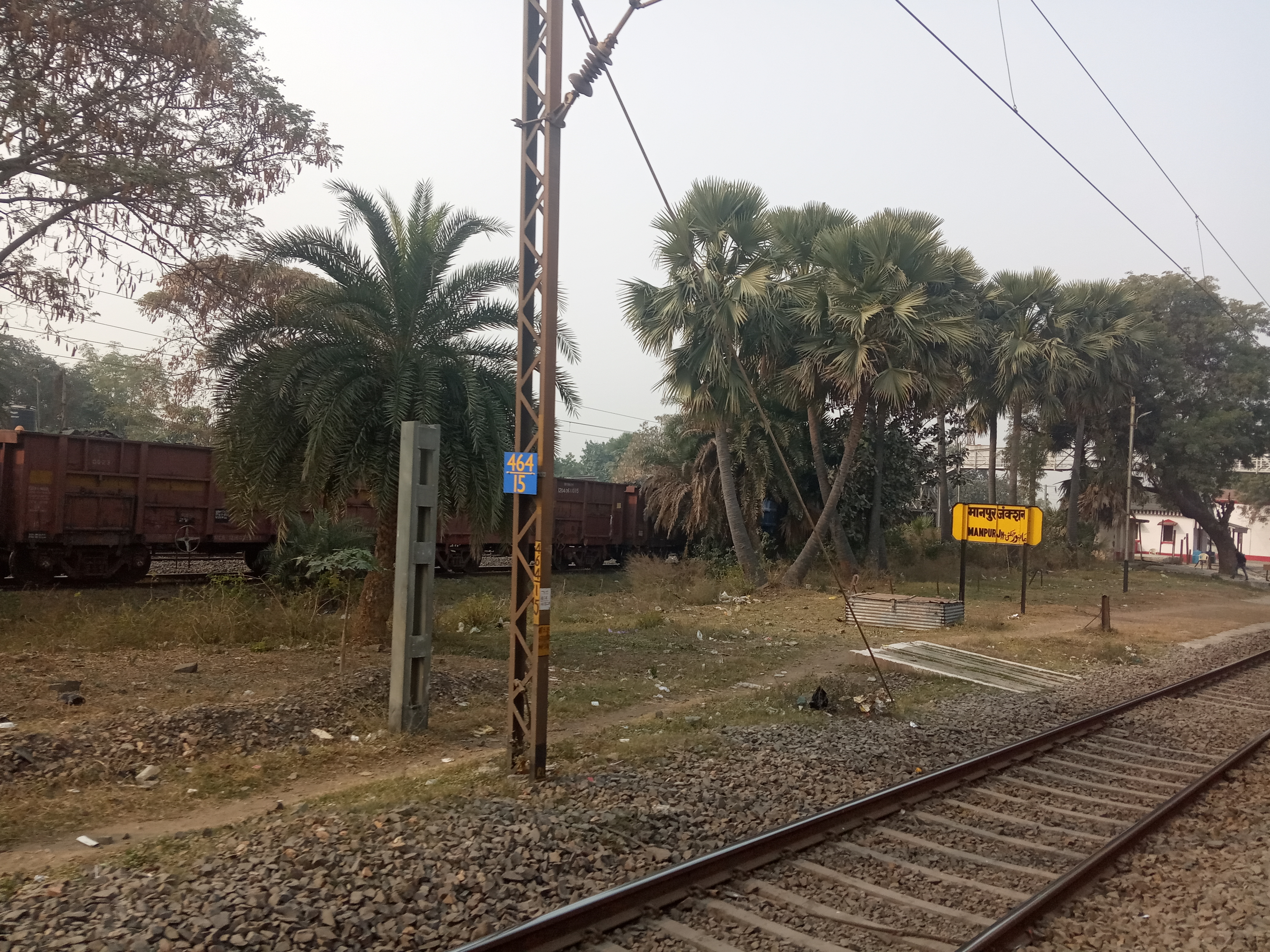

General information
- Location: Kamalpur, Manpur, Gaya district, Bihar; India
- Coordinates: 24.807111°N 85.044738°E
- Elevation: 112 metres (367 ft)
- System: Passenger train Station
- Owner: Indian Railways
- Line: Gaya–Kiul line
- Platforms: 4
- Tracks: 2

Construction
- Structure type: Standard (on-ground station)

Other information
- Status: Functioning
- Station code: MPO
- Zone(s): East Central Railway zone
- Division(s): Pandit Deen Dayal Upadhyaya

History
- Opened: 1879; 147 years ago
- Electrified: 2018
- Former names: East Indian Railway

Services
Preceding station	Indian Railways	Following station
Shaheed Ishwar Chowdhary Halt towards ?	East Central Railway zone Gaya–Kiul line	Paimar towards ?
Bandhua towards ?	East Central Railway zone Asansol–Gaya section	Terminus
Location

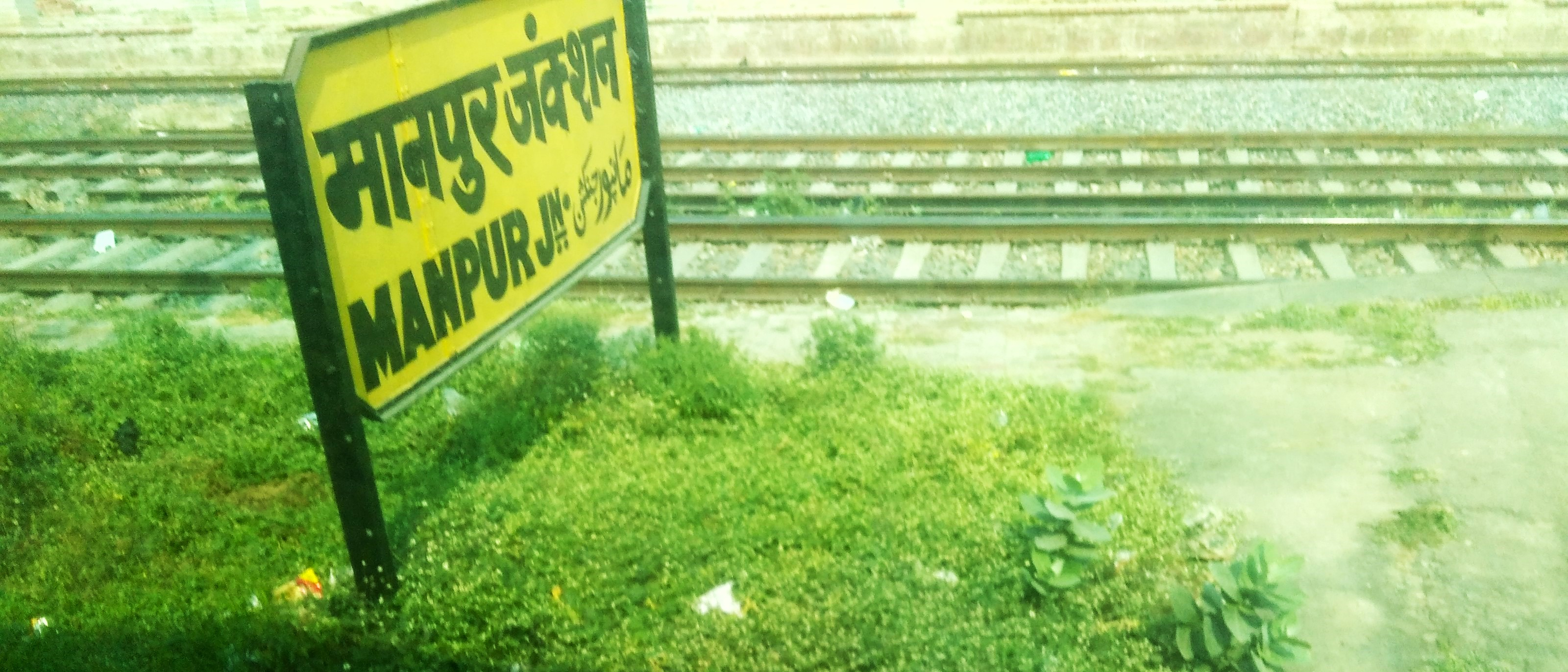
Manpur junction railway station

Manpur Junction railway station (station code: MPO) is a railway j,unction station on Gaya–Kiul line of Delhi–Kolkata Main Line in East Central Railway zone under Pandit Deen Dayal Upadhyaya railway division of the Indian Railways. The railway station is situated at Kamalpur, Manpur in Gaya district in the Indian state of Bihar.
