= Kashi Chak railway station =

Railway station in Bihar

Kashi Chak

General information
- Location: Kashi Chak, Nawada district, Bihar; India
- Coordinates: 25.070799°N 85.718754°E
- Elevation: 62 metres (203 ft)
- System: Passenger & express train station
- Owner: Indian Railways
- Operator: IR
- Line: Gaya–Kiul line
- Platforms: 2
- Tracks: 4
- Connections: Food stall available, drinking water available, transport facility available

Construction
- Structure type: Standard (on-ground station)
- Parking: Available

Other information
- Status: Functioning
- Station code: KSC
- Zone(s): East Central Railway zone

History
- Opened: 1879; 147 years ago
- Rebuilt: October 2023
- Electrified: 2018
- Former names: Kashi chak

Passengers
- Approx 1500 pass./day

Services
Ticket counter, free wifi
Preceding station	Indian Railways	Following station
Baghi Ghauspur Halt towards ?	East Central Railway zone Gaya–Kiul line	Dergaon Halt towards ?
Location

Kashi Chak railway station (station code: KSC), is a railway station on Gaya–Kiul line of Delhi–Kolkata Main Line in East Central Railway zone under Danapur railway division of the Indian Railways. The railway station is situated at Kashi Chak in Nawada district in the Indian state of Bihar.
