= Nagarnausa =

Nagarnausa नगरनौसा
- Village
- Location in Bihar, India
- Coordinates: 25.3963°N 85.34396°E
- Country: India
- State: Bihar
- District: Nalanda

Population (2011)
  - Total: 11,008

Languages
  - Official: Hindi, English
  - Regional: Magahi
- Time zone: UTC+05:30 (IST)
- PIN: 801305
- Telephone code: 06111
- Vehicle registration: BR-21
- Lok Sabha constituency: Nalanda
- Vidhan Sabha constituency: Harnaut

Nagarnausa is a village and the headquarters of Nagarnausa block in Nalanda district of the state of Bihar. It is located about 30 kilometres from Bihar Sharif, the district headquarters.

According to the 2011 Census of India, Nagarnausa had a population of 11,008. The village is part of the Nalanda Lok Sabha constituency and the Harnaut Assembly constituency of the Bihar Legislative Assembly.

== Geography ==
Nagarnausa is located in Nalanda district of Bihar. It serves as the administrative headquarters of Nagar Nausa block.

== Demographics ==
According to the 2011 Census of India, Nagarnausa had a population of 11,008. Hindi and English are used in the area, while Magahi is a regional language.

== Transport ==
The nearest railway station is Daniyawan Junction railway station. The village is also connected by road to nearby towns and villages.

== Administration and politics ==
Nagarnausa is the headquarters of Nagar Nausa block. It comes under the Nalanda Lok Sabha constituency and the Harnaut Assembly constituency. The Nagarnausa Police Station caters to the block.
