= Shaheed Ishwar Chowdhary Halt railway station =

Railway station in Bihar

Shaheed Ishwar Chowdhary Halt

General information
- Location: Manpur, Gaya district, Bihar; India
- Coordinates: 24.807414°N 85.01491°E
- Elevation: 112 metres (367 ft)
- System: Passenger train Station
- Owner: Indian Railways
- Line: Gaya–Kiul line
- Platforms: 2
- Tracks: 2

Construction
- Structure type: Standard (on-ground station)

Other information
- Status: Functioning
- Station code: SICY
- Zone(s): East Central Railway zone
- Division(s): Mughalsarai

History
- Opened: 1879; 147 years ago
- Former names: East Indian Railway

Services
Preceding station	Indian Railways	Following station
Gaya Junction towards ?	East Central Railway zone Gaya–Kiul line	Manpur Junction towards ?
Location

Shaheed Ishwar Chowdhary Halt (station code: SICY), is a halt railway station on Gaya–Kiul line of Delhi–Kolkata Main Line in East Central Railway zone under Mughalsarai railway division of the Indian Railways. The railway station is situated at Manpur in Gaya district in the Indian state of Bihar.
