= Malda Town–Gomti Nagar (Lucknow) Amrit Bharat Express =

Amrit Bharat Express train route in India

Malda Town – Gomti Nagar Amrit Bharat Express
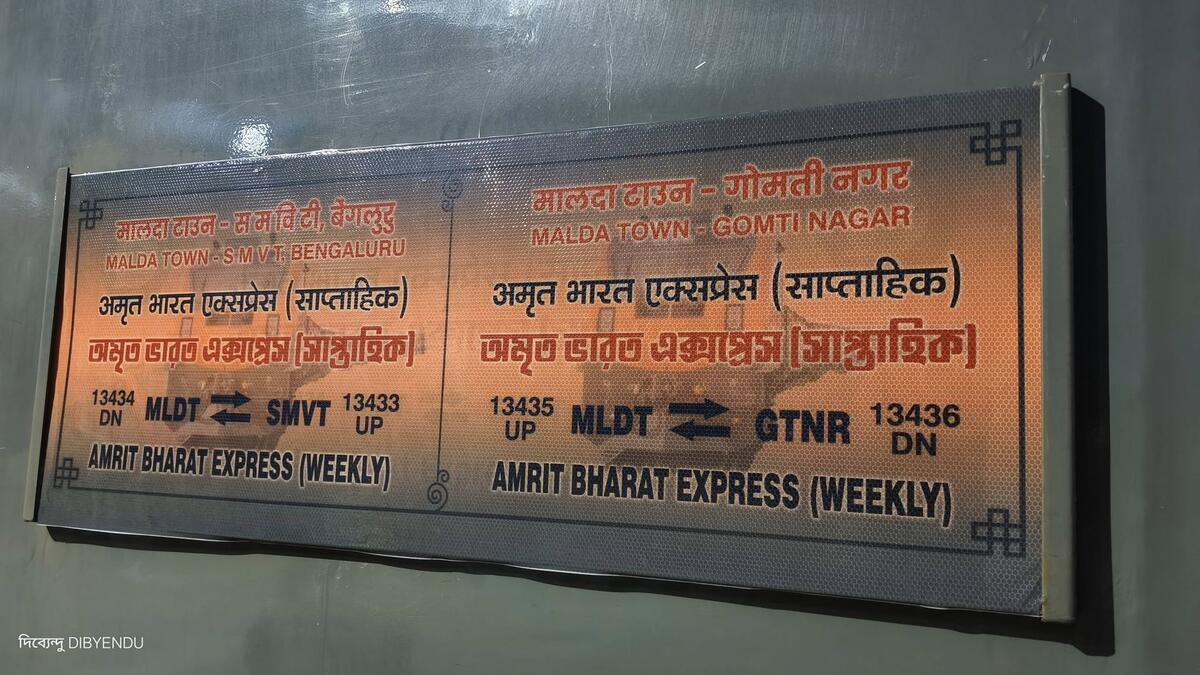

Overview
- Service type: Amrit Bharat Express, Mail/Express
- Status: Active
- Locale: West Bengal, Bihar and Uttar Pradesh
- First service: 18 July 2025 (Inaugural); 24 July 2025 (Commercial)
- Current operator: Eastern Railways (ER)

Route
- Termini: Malda Town (MLDT); Gomti Nagar (GTNR)
- Stops: 23
- Distance travelled: 948 km (589 mi)
- Average journey time: 19h 35m
- Service frequency: Weekly
- Train number: 13435 / 13436
- Lines used: Malda Town–New Farakka line; Barharwa–Sahibganj section; Sahibganj–Bhagalpur–Jamalpur line; Kiul–Gaya line; Gaya–Pt. Deen Dayal Upadhyaya line; Pt. Deen Dayal Upadhyaya–Varanasi–Jaunpur line; Ayodhya Dham–Ayodhya Cantt–Gomti Nagar line via Lucknow Junction

On-board services
- Class: Sleeper class (SL) General Unreserved (GS)
- Seating arrangements: Yes
- Sleeping arrangements: Yes
- Entertainment facilities: Electric outlets; Reading lights; Bottle holder
- Other facilities: CCTV cameras; Bio-vacuum toilets; Foot-operated water taps; Passenger information system

Technical
- Rolling stock: Modified LHB coaches
- Track gauge: Indian gauge
- Electrification: 25 kV 50 Hz AC overhead line
- Average length: 23.54 m (77.2 ft) (each) and 22 coaches
- Track owner: Indian Railways
- Rake maintenance: Malda Town (MLDT)
- Rake sharing: Malda Town–SMVT Bengaluru Amrit Bharat Express

The 13435/13436 Malda Town – Gomti Nagar Amrit Bharat Express is India's 6th Non-AC Superfast Amrit Bharat Express train. It connects the city of Malda in West Bengal with Lucknow, the capital city of Uttar Pradesh.

This express train was inaugurated on July 18, 2025, by Prime Minister Narendra Modi.

== Rake ==
The train uses the lieover rake of Malda Town-SMVT Bengaluru Amrit Bharat Express, an Amrit Bharat 1.0 trainset. The locomotives are designed by Chittaranjan Locomotive Works (CLW) in Chittaranjan, West Bengal and the coaches are designed and manufactured by the Integral Coach Factory at Perambur, Chennai under the Make in India initiative.

The rake has 22 coaches, out of which 2 are Seating cum Luggage (SLR) coaches, 8 are General Unreserved (GS) coaches and 12 are Sleeper class (SL) coaches. The primary maintenance of the rake is executed at Malda Town.

== Service ==
- The 13435 Malda Town – Gomti Nagar Amrit Bharat Express leaves Malda Town at 19:25 hrs every Thursday and reaches Gomti Nagar the next day at 15:40 hrs. It covers its journey in 20 hrs 15 min, averaging at 47 km/h (29 mph).
- The 13436 Gomti Nagar – Malda Town Amrit Bharat Express leaves Gomti Nagar at 18:40 hrs every Friday and reaches Malda Town the next day at 16:40 hrs. It covers its journey in 22 hrs, averaging at 43 km/h (27 mph).
- The maximum permissible speed of this train is 130 km/h (81 mph).

== Route and halts ==
The halts for this Amrit Bharat Express will is given below:

1. Malda Town (start)
2. New Farakka Junction
3. Barharwa Junction
4. Sahibganj Junction
5. Kahalgaon
6. Bhagalpur Junction
7. Sultanganj
8. Jamalpur Junction
9. Abhaipur
10. Kiul Junction
11. Sheikhpura
12. Warisaliganj
13. Nawada
14. Tilaiya Junction
15. Gaya Junction
16. Dehri-on-Sone
17. Sasaram Junction
18. Bhabua Road
19. Pt. Deen Dayal Upadhyaya Junction
20. Varanasi Junction
21. Jaunpur Junction
22. Shahganj Junction
23. Ayodhya Dham Junction
24. Ayodhya Cantt. Junction
25. Gomti Nagar (end)

== See also ==
- Amrit Bharat Express
- Malda Town–SMVT Bengaluru Amrit Bharat Express
- Vande Bharat Express
- Tejas Express
- Gatimaan Express
- Malda Town railway station
- Gomti Nagar railway station
