= Kusumha Bihar Halt railway station =

Railway station in Bihar

Kusumha Bihar Halt

General information
- Location: Sheikhpura-Kusmaha Road, Kusmaha, Sheikhpura district, Bihar; India
- Coordinates: 25.114944°N 85.798364°E
- Elevation: 57 metres (187 ft)
- System: Passenger train Station
- Owner: Indian Railways
- Line: Gaya–Kiul line
- Platforms: 1
- Tracks: 2

Construction
- Structure type: Standard (on-ground station)

Other information
- Status: Functioning
- Station code: KSMB
- Zone(s): East Central Railway zone
- Division(s): Danapur

History
- Opened: 1879; 147 years ago
- Electrified: 2018

Services
Preceding station	Indian Railways	Following station
Derhgaon Halt towards ?	East Central Railway zone Gaya–Kiul line	Sheikhpura Junction towards ?
Location

Kusumha Bihar Halt railway station (station code: KSMB), is a halt railway station on Gaya–Kiul line of Delhi–Kolkata Main Line in East Central Railway zone under Danapur railway division of the Indian Railways. The railway station is situated beside Sheikhpura-Kusmaha Road at Kusmaha in Sheikhpura district in the Indian state of Bihar.
