= Jamuawan railway station =

Railway station in Bihar

Jamuawan

General information
- Location: Jumuanwan, Gaya district, Bihar; India
- Coordinates: 24.81523°N 85.292477°E
- Elevation: 109 metres (358 ft)
- System: Passenger train Station
- Owner: Indian Railways
- Line: Gaya–Kiul line
- Platforms: 1
- Tracks: 2

Construction
- Structure type: Standard (on-ground station)

Other information
- Status: Functioning
- Station code: JMN
- Zone(s): East Central Railway zone
- Division(s): Danapur

History
- Opened: 1879; 147 years ago
- Electrified: 2018
- Former names: East Indian Railway

Services
Preceding station	Indian Railways	Following station
Pura Halt towards ?	East Central Railway zone Gaya–Kiul line	Manjhwe towards ?
Location

Jamuawan railway station (station code: JMN), is a railway station on Gaya–Kiul line of Delhi–Kolkata Main Line in East Central Railway zone under Danapur railway division of the Indian Railways. The railway station is situated at Jumuanwan in Gaya district in the Indian state of Bihar.
