= Patwatoli =

Indian village in Gaya district, Bihar

Patwatoli Manpur
- Village
- Location in Bihar, India
- Coordinates: 24.82°N 85.03°E
- Country: India
- State: Bihar
- District: Gaya
- Named for: Weaver, IITians

Languages
  - Official: Magahi, Hindi, Patwa
- Time zone: UTC+5:30 (IST)
- PIN: 823003
- Telephone code: 0631
- Nearest town: Bodh Gaya
- Lok Sabha constituency: Gaya Town
- Vidhan Sabha constituency: Gaya Town

Patwatoli is a village locality in the Manpur block of the Gaya district, Bihar, India. It is traditionally known for its weavers but now known for having a high number of youths studying at Indian Institutes of Technology (IIT) and National Institutes of Technology (NIT), with at least 200 of the 1,000 households in the locality having at least one engineer.

Some students have started opting for the diverse academic course. First success had come in 2018 in Bihar Public Service Commission (BPSC).

Students qualified for Indian Institutes of Technology in 2018 was 5.

In 2025, 40 students from the town were selected for IIT. Some former residents of Patwa Toli, themselves IIT graduates, have created an organisation called ‘Vriksha’ which provides free coaching and supplies study materials and organizes online classes, since 2013.

Patwa Toli’s tryst with the IITs began in 1991, when Jitendra Kumar became the first person from the area to qualify for the IITs. His success inspired others and from 1999 onwards 58 students have made it to the tech hubs.
