= Malda Town–SMVT Bengaluru Amrit Bharat Express =

Amrit Bharat Express train route in India

Malda Town - SMVT Bengaluru Amrit Bharat Express
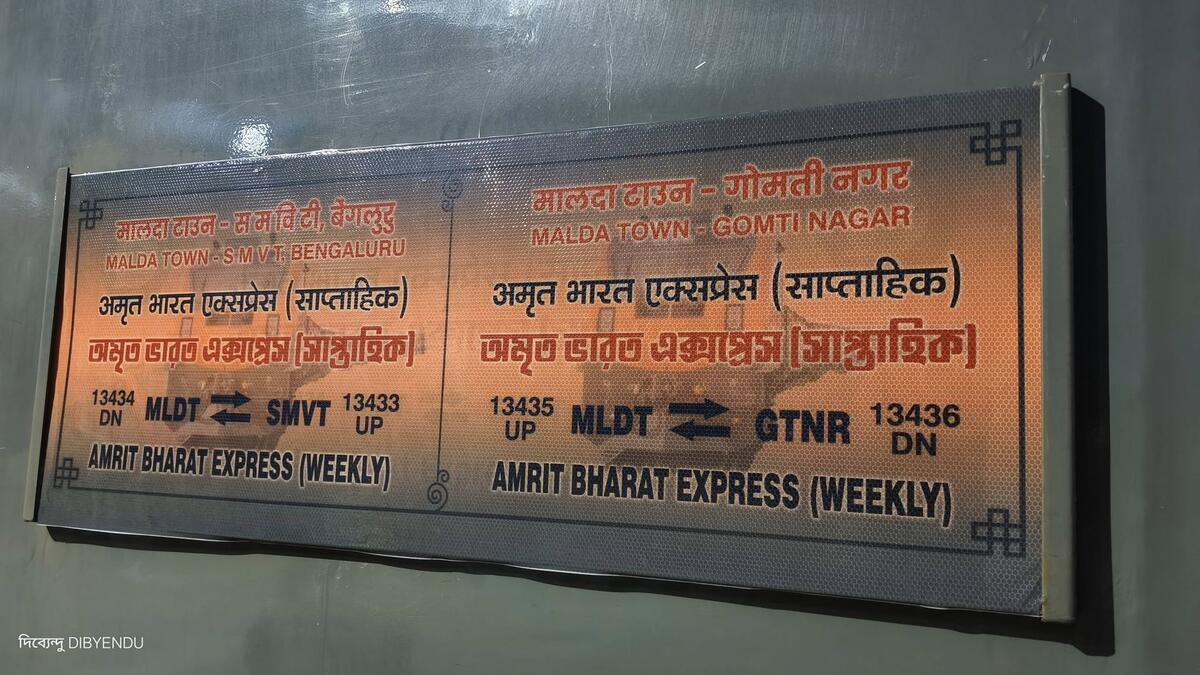
- Train Board of this Express train

Overview
- Service type: Amrit Bharat Express, Superfast Express Train
- Locale: West Bengal, Jharkhand, Odisha, Andhra Pradesh, Tamil Nadu and Karnataka
- First service: 30 December 2023 (Inaugural); 07 January 2024; 2 years ago (Commercial)
- Current operator: Eastern Railways (ER)

Route
- Termini: Malda Town (MLDT); Sir M. Visvesvaraya Terminal (SMVB)
- Stops: 32
- Distance travelled: 2,247 km (1,396 mi)
- Average journey time: 42 hrs 15 mins
- Service frequency: Weekly services (Note: 13434 - Sundays | 13433 - Tuesdays)
- Train number: 13434/13433
- Lines used: Malda Town-Rampurhat section; Rampurhat-Bardhaman Section; Bardhaman-Howrah Chord Line; Khurda Road–Visakhapatnam section; Chennai Central–Bangalore City line; Katpadi–SMVT Bengaluru line

On-board services
- Class: Sleeper Class Coach (SL) General Unreserved Coach (GS)
- Seating arrangements: Yes (08 Coaches)
- Sleeping arrangements: Yes (12 Coaches)
- Observation facilities: Saffron-Grey Livery
- Entertainment facilities: Electric Outlets; Reading lights; Bottle Holder
- Other facilities: CCTV cameras; Bio-Vacuum Toilets; Foot-Operated Water Taps; Passenger information system

Technical
- Rolling stock: Modified LHB Coaches
- Track gauge: Indian gauge 1,676 mm (5 ft 6 in) broad gauge
- Electrification: 25 kV 50 Hz AC Overhead line
- Operating speed: 55 km/h (34 mph) (Avg.)
- Average length: 23.54 m (77.2 ft) (each) and 22 coaches
- Track owner: Indian Railways
- Rake maintenance: Malda Town (MLDT)
- Rake sharing: Malda Town - Gomti Nagar Amrit Bharat Express

The 13434/13433 Malda Town - SMVT Bengaluru Amrit Bharat Express is India's 2nd Non-AC Superfast Amrit Bharat Express train, which runs across the states of Karnataka, Tamil Nadu, Andhra Pradesh, Odisha, Jharkhand and West Bengal by connecting the city of Malda in West Bengal with Bangalore, the capital city of Karnataka via Rampurhat, Kharagpur, Cuttack.

This express train was inaugurated on 30 December 2023 by Prime Minister Narendra Modi via video conferencing from Ayodhya Dham Junction.

== Overview ==
This train is operated by Indian Railways, connecting Malda Town and SMVT Bengaluru. It is currently operated with train numbers 13434/13433 on Weekly services.

== Rakes ==
It is the second Amrit Bharat Express train in which the locomotives were designed by Chittaranjan Locomotive Works (CLW) at Chittaranjan, West Bengal and the coaches were designed and manufactured by the Integral Coach Factory at Perambur, Chennai under the Make in India Initiative.

== Service ==
The 13434/13433 Malda Town - SMVT Bengaluru Amrit Bharat Express currently operates Weekly, covering a distance of 2,272 km (1,412 mi) in a travel time of 45hrs 10mins with average speed of 55 km/h. The Maximum Permissible Speed (MPS) is 130 km/h (81 mph).

== Train halts ==
The halts for this 13433/13434 SMVT Bengaluru - Malda Town Amrit Bharat Express are as follows:-

1. Malda Town
2. New Farakka Junction
3. Pakur
4. Rampurhat Junction
5. Bolpur Shantiniketan
6. Barddhaman Junction
7. Dankuni Junction
8. Andul
9. Kharagpur Junction
10. Belda
11. Jaleswar
12. Balasore
13. Soro
14. Bhadrak
15. Cuttack Junction
16. Bhubaneswar
17. Khurda Road Junction
18. Brahmapur
19. Srikakulam Road
20. Vizianagaram Junction
21. Visakhapatnam Junction
  (Reversal)
22. Tuni
23. Samalkot Junction
24. Rajahmundry
25. Eluru
26. Vijayawada Junction
27. Tenali Junction
28. Chirala
29. Ongole
30. Nellore
31. Gudur Junction
32. Renigunta Junction
33. Katpadi Junction
34. Jolarpettai Junction
35. Sir M. Visvesvaraya Terminal

== Rake sharing ==
The train shares its rakes with 13435/36 Malda Town - Gomti Nagar Amrit Bharat Express.

== See also ==
- Amrit Bharat Express
- Malda Town - Gomti Nagar Amrit Bharat Express
- Vande Bharat Express
- Tejas Express
- Gatimaan Express
- Malda Town railway station
- Sir M. Visvesvaraya Terminal
