= Naromurar =

- Village in India - 257587
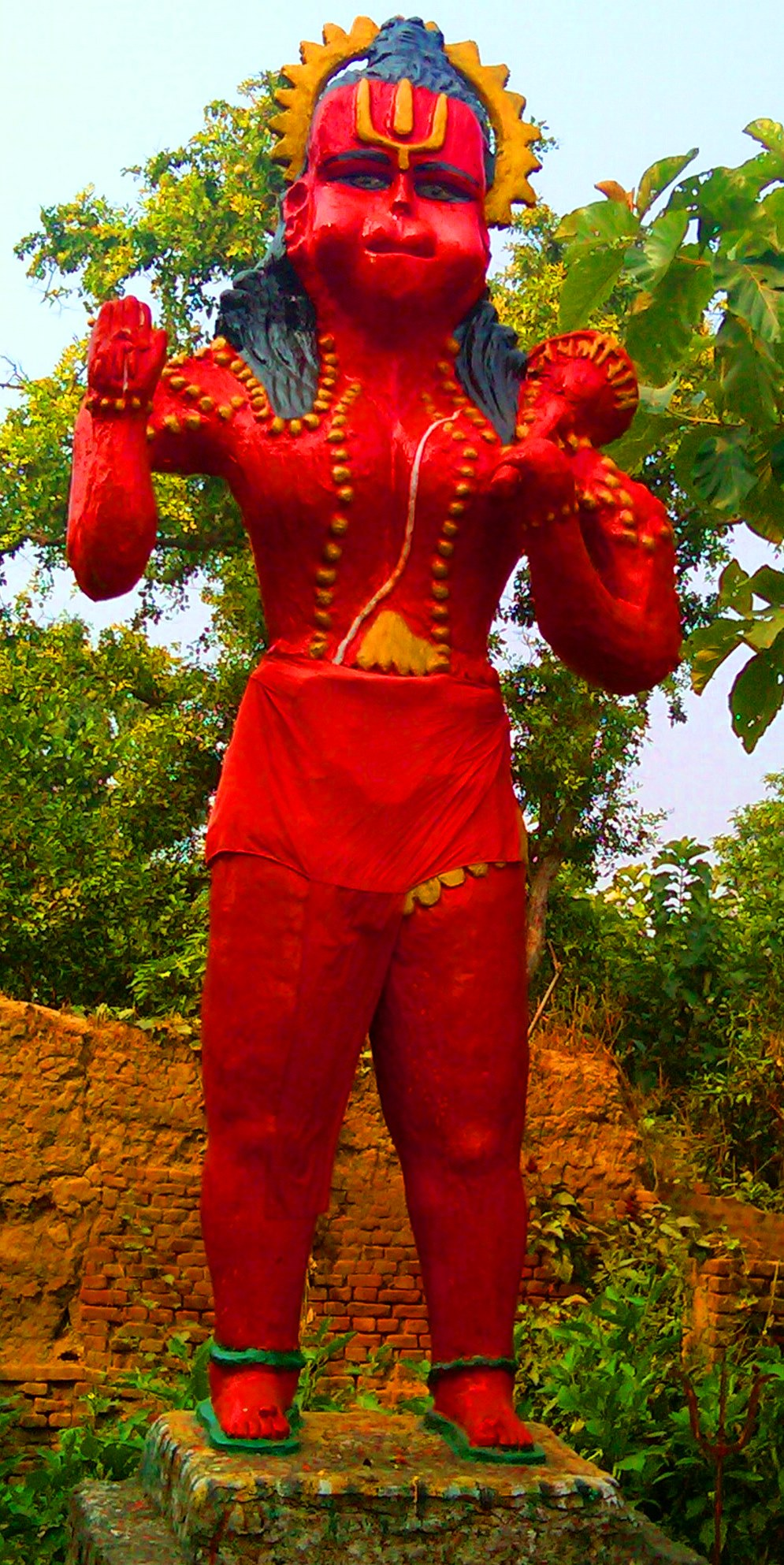
- 32 Feet Hanumanta - Naromurar Thakur Wadi, Built by saint Hanuman Das in 2001 AD

- Location in Bihar, India Naromurar (India)
- Coordinates: 25.02°N 85.60°E
- Country: India
- State: Bihar
- Region: Magadha
- District: Nawada
- Block: Warisaliganj
- Gram Panchayat: Kutri
- Ward: 4 wards
- Founder: Naro Singh and Murar Singh

Population (2011)
  - Total: 2,035

Languages
  - Spoken: Hindi, Magadhi
- Time zone: UTC+5:30 (IST)
- PIN: 805130
- Telephone code: 06324
- Vehicle registration: BR-27
- Sex ratio: 1000 - 944 ♂/♀
- Website: www.naromurar.in

Naromurar is a village in Warisaliganj Tehsil, Bihar, India.

== Administration ==
Naromurar is one of the 75 villages under the administrative region of warisaliganj block in Nawada district. Giriraj Singh is the Incumbent Member of Parliament from Nawada and Aruna Devi is the Member of legislative Assembly from Warisaliganj.

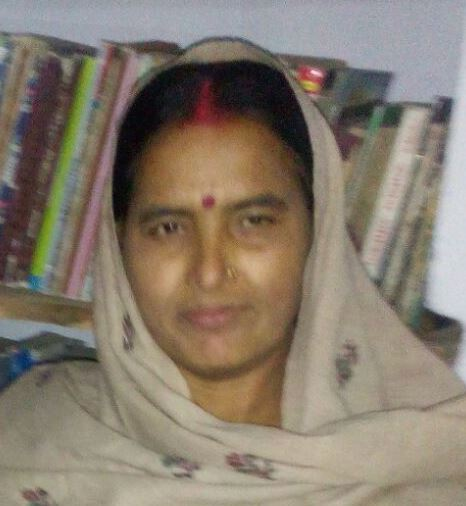
Aruna Devi - Incumbent MLA, Warisaliganj

=== Gram Panchayat ===
Warisaliganj is one of the 14 Panchayat Samitis under Nawada Jila Parishad. Warisaliganj Panchayat Samiti is further subdivided into sixteen Gram panchayats for better administration. Naromurar comes in the administrative division of kutri Gram Panchayat under Warisaliganj Panchayat Samiti.

Sr. No.	PRI Designation	Incumbent Holder
1.	Gram Panchayat Mukhiya	Satyabhama Devi
2.	Panchayat Samity Pramukh	Naresh Paswan
3.	Zila Parshad	Dharmsheela Devi

=== Naromurar Wards ===
Naromurar Village is further subdivided into four wards. Current Wards are -
Satrughan Kumar
Ramashish Mochi
Bina Devi
Buni Devi

== Demography ==
=== Population and Sex Ratio ===
Naromurar is a large village located in Warisaliganj of Nawada district, Bihar with total 290 families residing. The Naromurar village has population of 2035 of which 1047 are males while 988 are females as per Population Census 2011. In Naromurar village population of children with age 0-6 is 337 which makes up 16.56% of total population of village. Average Sex Ratio of Naromurar village is 944 which is higher than Bihar state average of 918. Child Sex Ratio for the Naromurar as per census is 764, lower than Bihar average of 935.

=== Literacy Rate ===
Naromurar village has higher literacy rate compared to Bihar. In 2011, literacy rate of Naromurar village was 73.20% compared to 61.80% of Bihar. In Naromurar Male literacy stands at 84.81% while female literacy rate was 61.40%. As per constitution of India and Panchyati Raaj Act, Naromurar village is administrated by Sarpanch (Head of Village) who is elected representative of village.

== Photo gallery ==
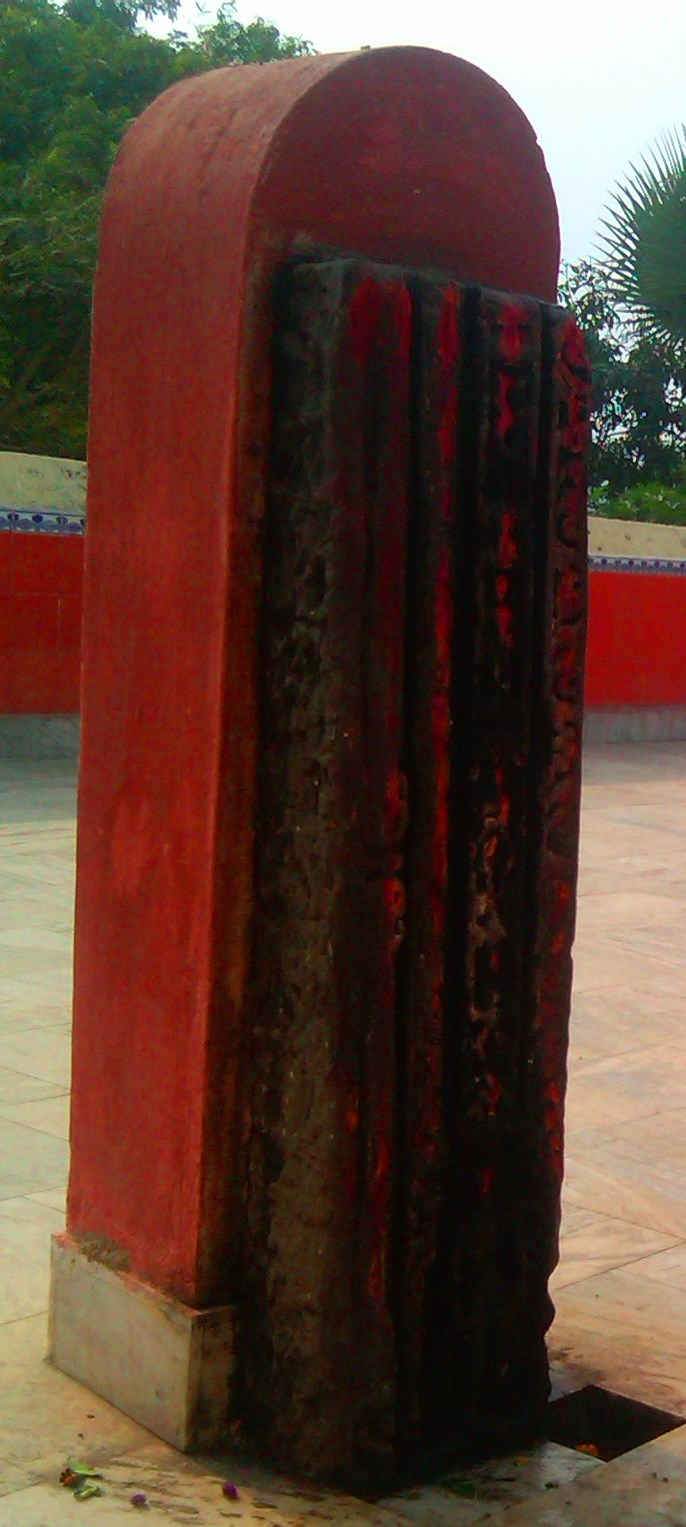
An ancient sculpture in Naromurar Devisthan

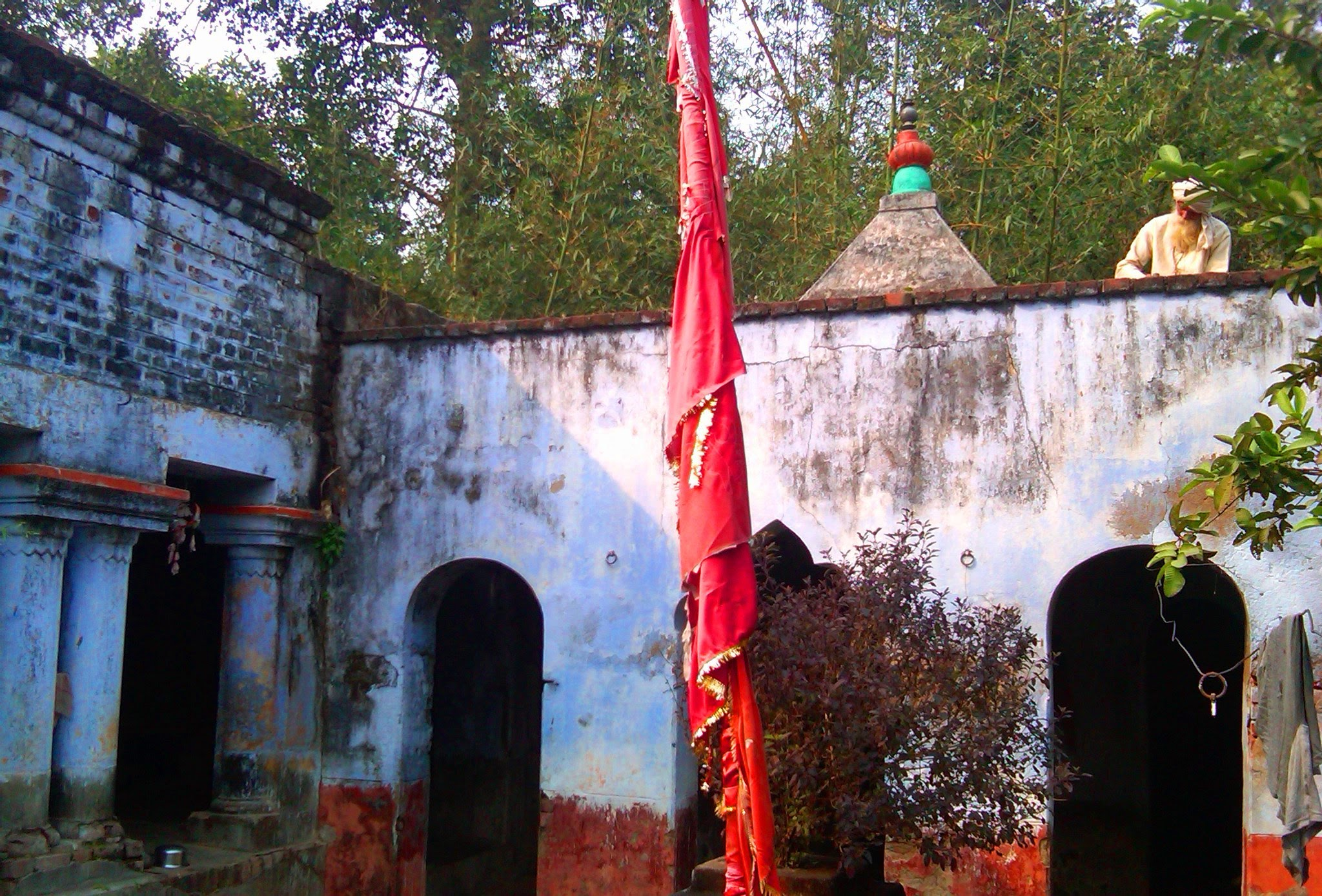
Naromurar Thakurwadi inside view

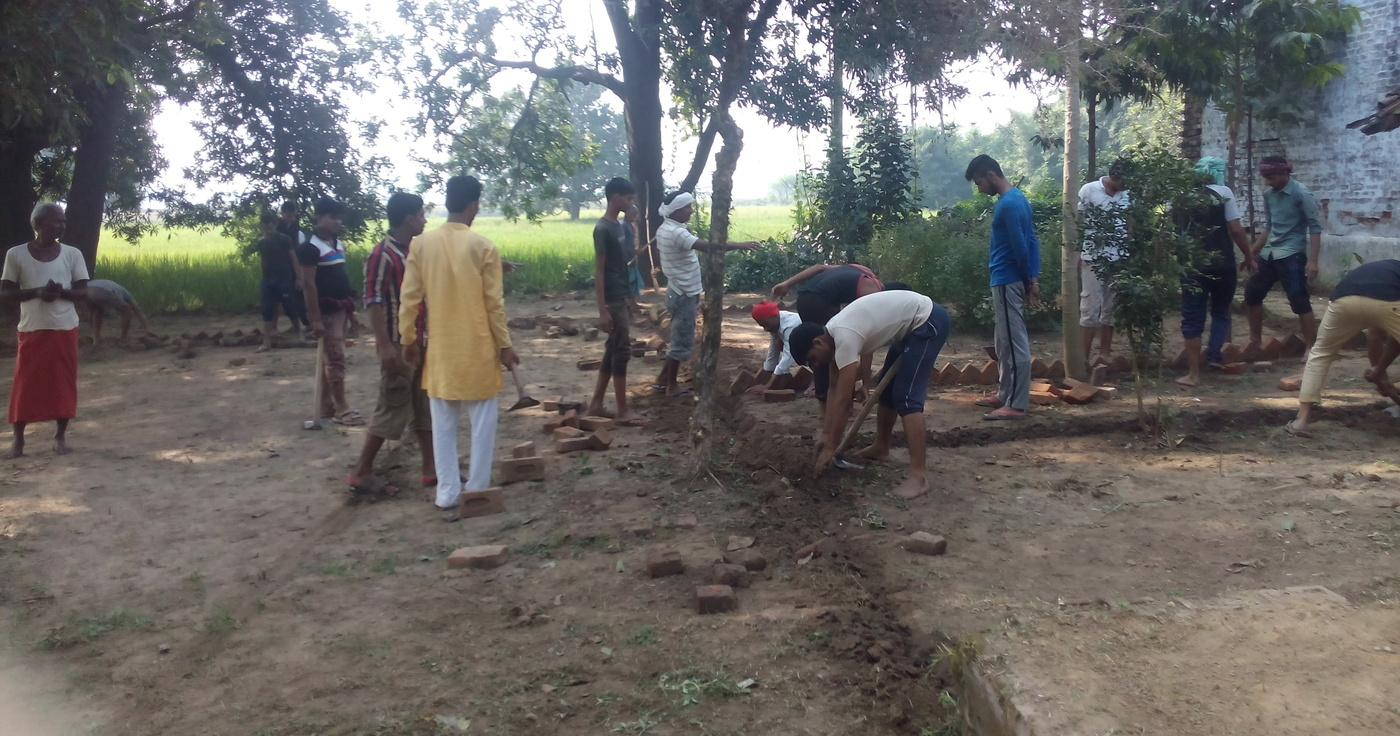
Sevak Sangh Volunteers during Thakur Wadi Renovation Project

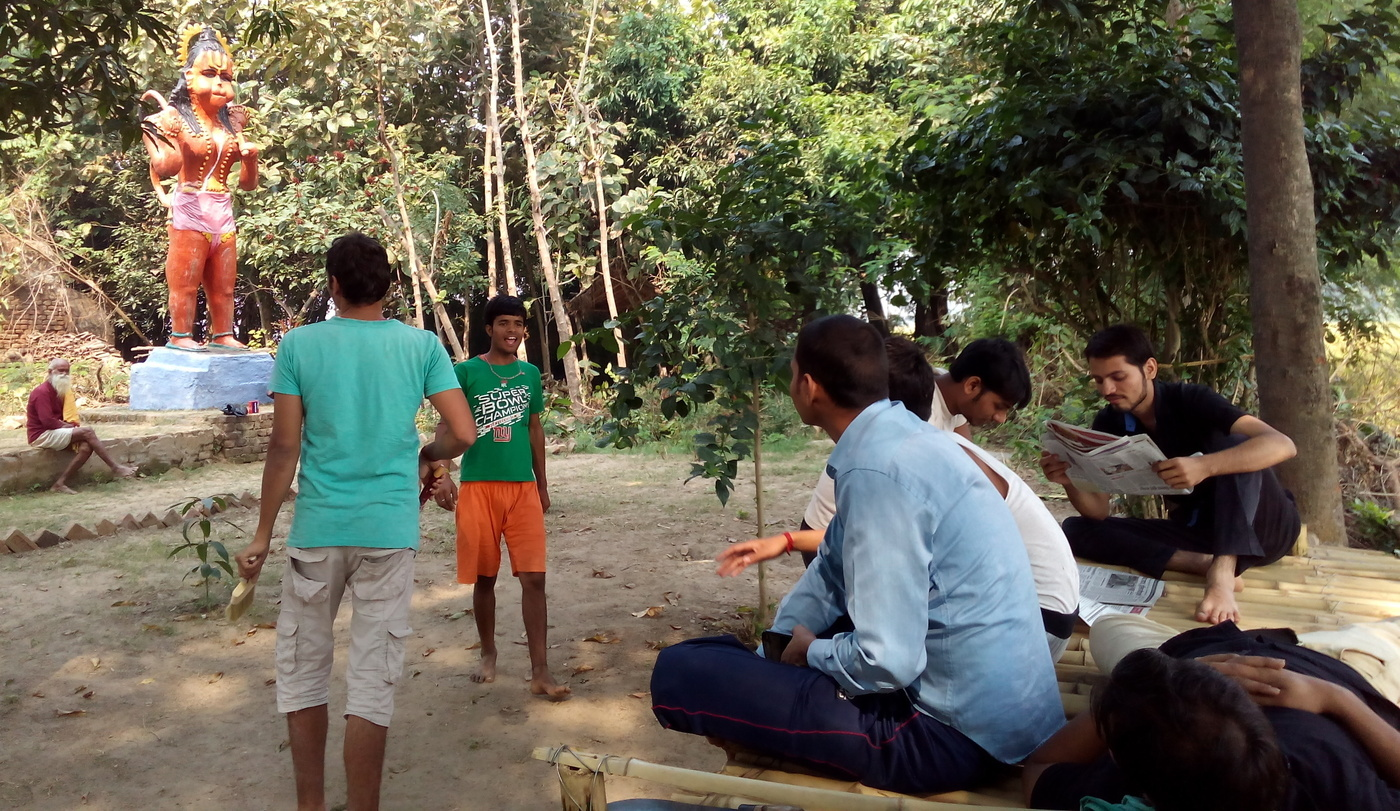
Naromurar Thakur Wadi outside View

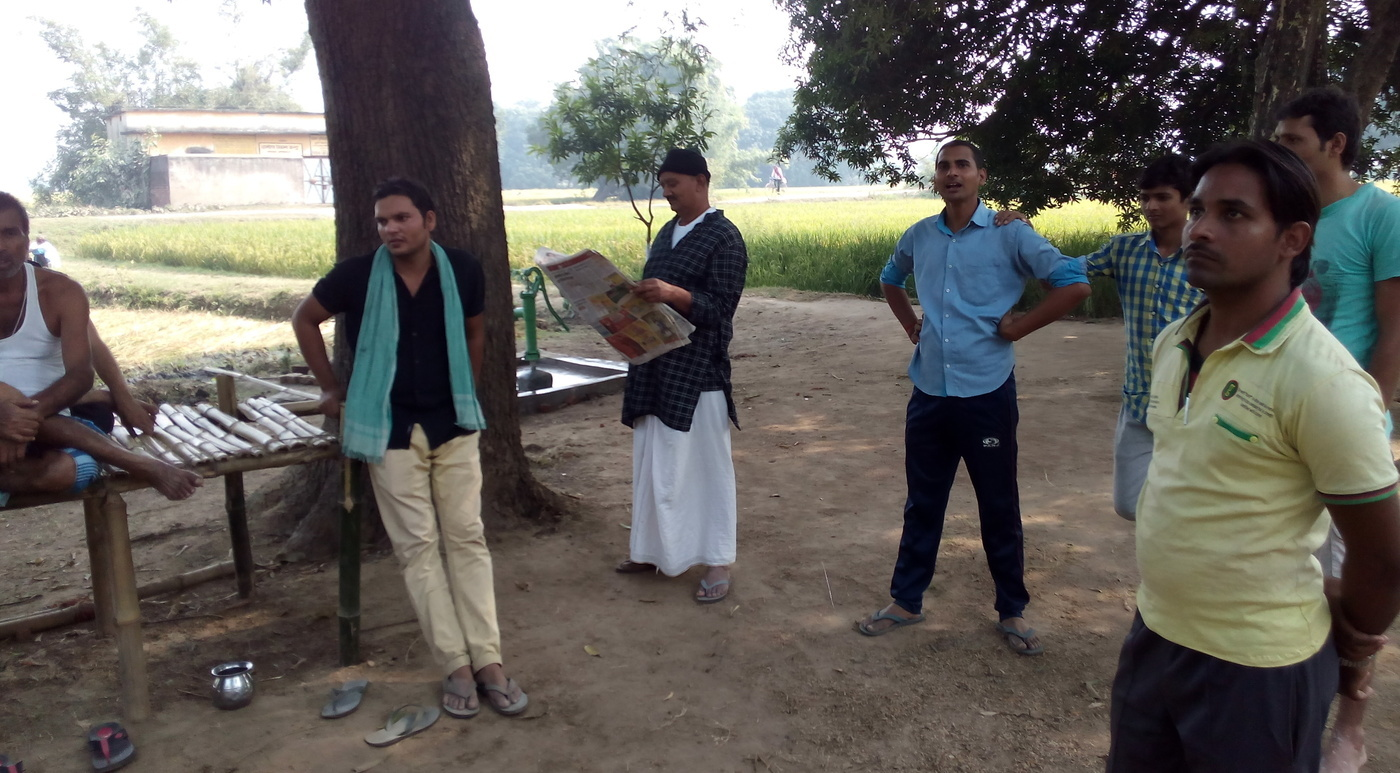
Villagers enjoying benefit of Daily Newspaper Project at Thakurwadi Premises

== See also ==
- Kakolat Falls
- Nalanda
- Government of Bihar
- Panchayati raj (India)
- Magadha
- Rajgir hills
- Barabar Caves
- Nawada
- Warisaliganj
