= Sarkatti =

Sarkatti is a village in the Nawada district of Bihar, India. It is situated on Gaya-Kiul railway line, and the Warisaliganj-Barbigha road.

The main occupation of the village is agricultural and dairy farming. The village was earlier a zamindari estate with 2284 bigha land. The village is mainly inhabited by Bhumihars.
