= Warisaliganj (community development block) =

Town in Bihar, India

Warisaliganj Warsaliganj
- Town
- Location in Bihar, India Warisaliganj (India)
- Coordinates: 25.01°N 85.63°E
- Country: India
- State: Bihar
- Region: Magadha
- District: Nawada
- Founder: Waris Ali Khan
- Wards: 26

Government
  - Body: Warisaliganj Nagar Parishad

Area
  - Total: 13.11 km^{2} (5.06 sq mi)
- Elevation: 68 m (223 ft)

Population (2011)
  - Total: 34,056
  - Density: 2,598/km^{2} (6,728/sq mi)

Language
  - Official: Hindi
  - Additional official: Urdu
  - Other: Magahi
- Time zone: UTC+5:30 (IST)
- PIN: 805130
- Vehicle registration: BR-27

Warisaliganj is a Community Development block and a Municipal Council in Nawada district in the Indian state of Bihar.

== History ==
Warisaliganj, to the north of Nawada, was founded by Waris Ali khan, brother of Kamgar khan in Mayi family.

== Geography ==
Warisaliganj is located at 25.01°N 85.63°E. It has an average elevation of 68 meters (223 feet). It is located in one of the most fertile areas of the state, with well-irrigated landscapes due to the Sakri River and its canal system.

== Demographics ==
As of the 2011 India census, Warisaliganj has a population of 34,056 of which 17,874 are males and 16,182 are females. The population of children aged 0–6 is 5,536, 16.26% of the town's total population. The female sex ratio is 905 compared to the state average of 918. The child sex ratio is around 953 compared to the Bihar state average of 935. Its literacy rate is 69.72%, higher than the state average of 61.80%. In Warisaliganj, male literacy is around 77.43% while female literacy is 61.12%. Scheduled Caste (SC) constitutes 11.95% of the town's population while Scheduled Tribe (ST) constitutes 0.20%.

=== Language ===
Languages spoken in Warisaliganj (2011)
1. Magahi 80.7 (79.8%)
2. Hindi 13.7 (13.5%)
3. Urdu 5.4 (5.34%)
4. Others 1.38 (1.36%)

The majority speaks Magahi, with a population of over 80%. followed by Standard Hindi and Urdu speakers.

=== Religion ===
Religion in Warisaliganj
Religion	Percent
Hinduism	91.9%
Islam	7.1%
Others	1.0%

the majority of Warisaliganj are Hindus with over 90% of the town's population, followed by significant Muslim population of 7%.

== Administration ==
Warisaliganj is divided into 25 wards for which elections are held every 5 years. The nagar parishad has total administration over housing, supplying basic amenities like water and sewage. It is also authorised to build roads within the town's limits and impose taxes on properties. Warisaliganj is part of Bihar's Warisaliganj legislative constituency. This area also includes Pakri Barawan and Kashichak. It also comes under the Nawada Lok Sabha constituency. Anita Devi is the area's incumbent MLA, representing the legislative constituency of Warisaliganj.

== Economy ==
The market consists of several big and small merchants. Due to being Indian Railway's, only rack point for freight cars in the whole district, the town has many wholesale spots. Warisaliganj was one of Bihar's famous industrial areas, having sugar and cotton mills until a few years ago. Nowadays, the famous Mohini sugar mill, situated on the outskirts of the town, is closed and shifted to BIADA. Adani Group is going to invest Rs 1400 crore through Ambuja Cement Limited on the same land which is owned by BIADA. The Adani group will set up a cement grinding unit for which BIADA has allotted land for this unit. Some small-scale industries are still present in different villages nearby.

== Places ==
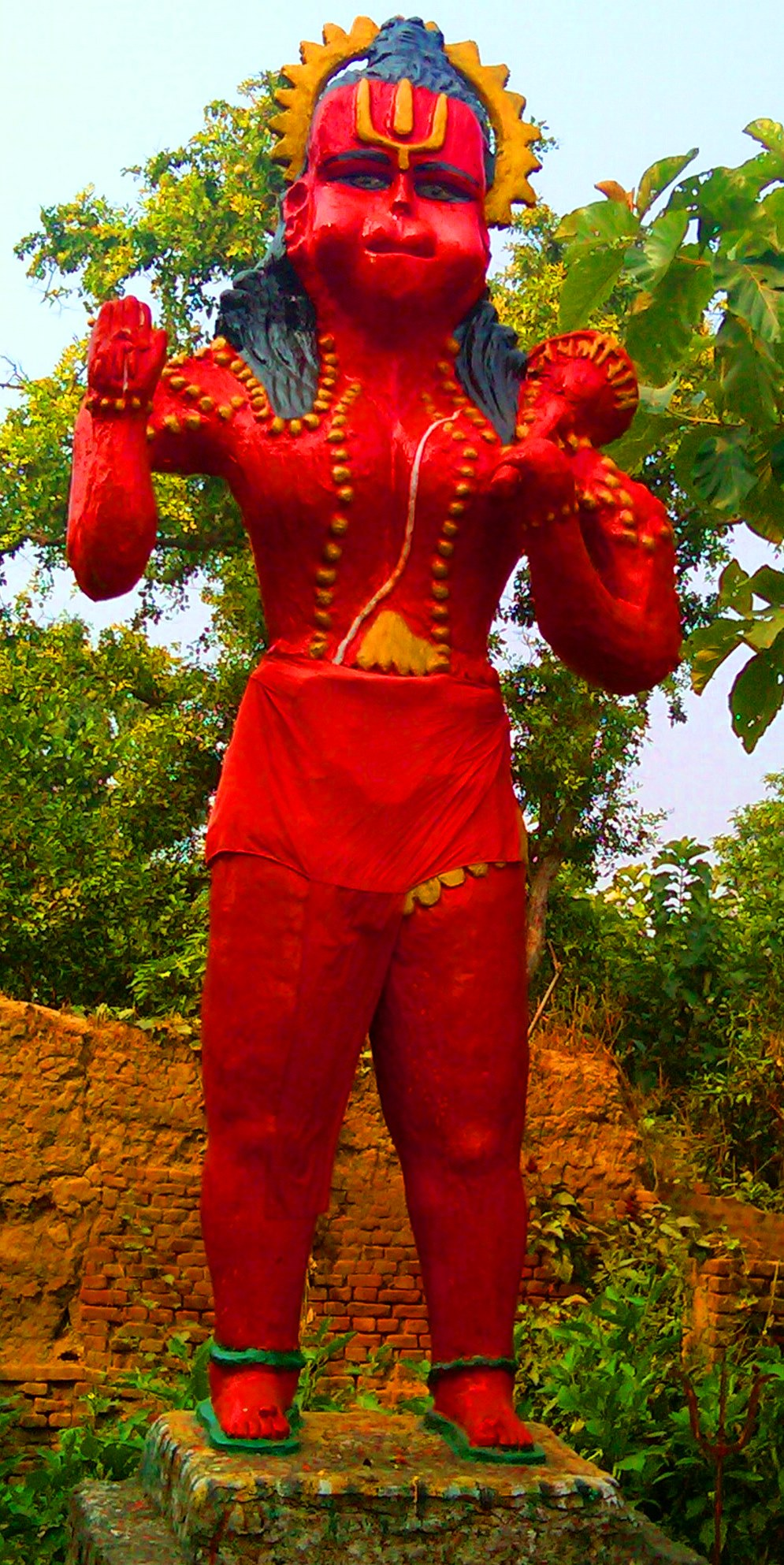
32 foot Hanumanta statue in Naromurar village, inaugurated in the Ram Yagya in the year 2001

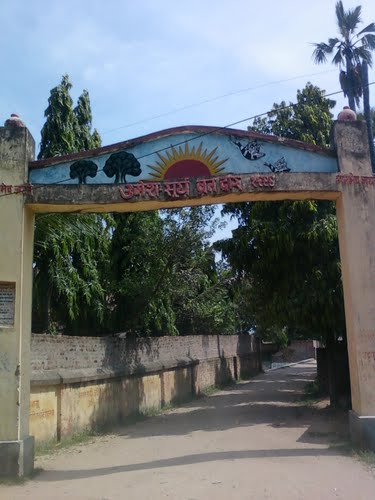
Surya Mandir Dwar

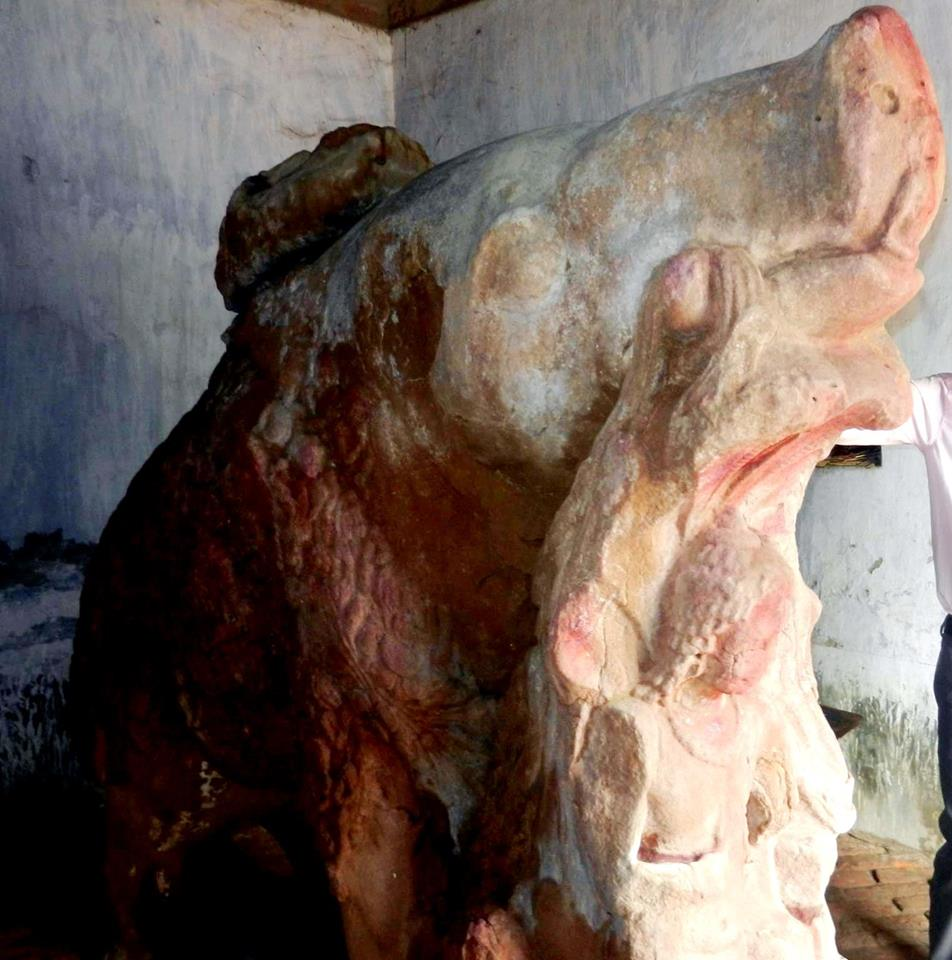
The Large Varaah Statue in Apsarh

The town itself has a few important places. The Sun Temple (Surya Mandir) is located on the outskirts of the town, near the administrative offices. It is used for celebrating all kinds of religious and spiritual events. The temple also has a recently opened Sanskrit college. There is a picnic spot called "Maafi Garh" in the outskirts of the town, near a referral hospital. It is used by locals on occasions like New Year and Makar Sankranti. Apart from these, the major tourist attractions nearby are Kakolat Falls, Rajgir, Bodhgaya and Pawapuri, all located one to two hours away.

Warisaliganj has many old attractions such as Maafi (which has existed since Dvapara Yuga, and is mentioned in the Mahabharata). Apsarh, Naromurar, Sarkatti are also of historical interest. A village, Dariyapur Parvati, is six miles north of Warisaliganj and has ruins and relics of Kapotika Bodh Bihar. In the center stands a famous temple dedicated to Avalokiteshwer. The village Apsarh is home to historical monuments originating from King Aditaysen.

The village Sarkatti is located 8 km from Warisaliganj and was once a highly decorated estate during the Zamindari system. It is also known for the huge traditional houses owned by the members of the Zamindar family.

Naromurar village is 8 km from the town. It is one of the ancient villages of India having a four-hundred-year-old Thakur Wadi dedicated to Rama and Shiva. A giant 32 foot Hanumanta statue also exists in Thakur Wadiwhich, built by saint Hanuman Das. There are three Gupta period statues of Vishnu in the Makanpur village, privately owned by Ram Ratan Prasad Singh Ratnakar, an eminent scholar and writer.

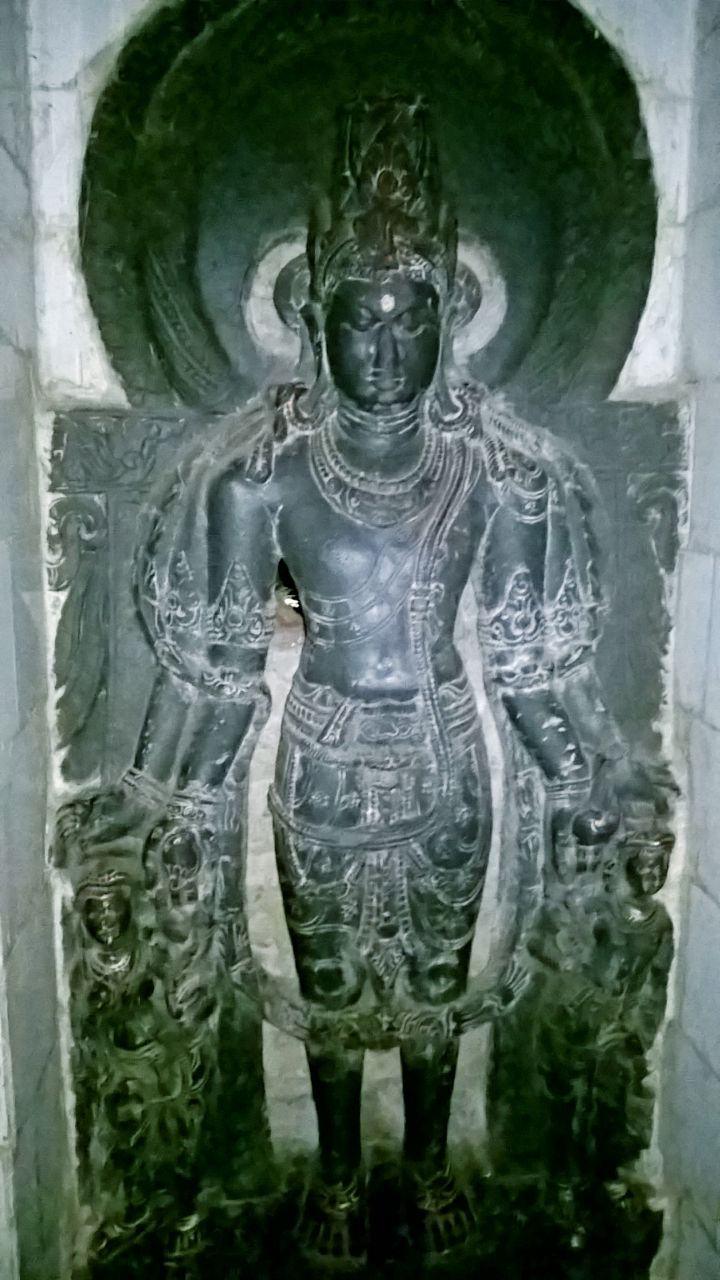
Vishnu statue in Makanpur

== Transport ==
The town is well connected to all other parts of the state by roadways and railways. SH 83 passes through Warisaliganj, connecting the Nawada and Sheikhpura districts. The very famous National Highway 20 (which is part of the Asian Highway Network) and Asian Highway 42 are just 11 km by road, connecting Patna and Ranchi. The other areas connected by roads are Nawada, Biharsharif, Patna, Rajgir, Pakri Barawan, and Barbigha. Direct Buses for Patna, Rajgir, Ranchi, Dhanbad, Tata, Begusarai, and Barbigha are also available. State Highway 71 and State Highway 83 meet at Shahpur Mor.

The town is also connected by the Indian Railways B.G. line through the Gaya–Kiul line of the East Central Railway. Warisaliganj Railway Station is an important rack point for freight cars. For local transport, frequent taxi facilities are provided by private vendors in and around the town. Rickshaws and autos are major means of local transport within the town.

=== Rail Network ===
1. Patna Railway Station → Gaya Railway Station → Warisaliganj Railway Station or Patna Railway Station → Kiul Railway Station → Warisaliganj Railway Station

=== Road network ===
- From Patna Bus Stand , Patna to Bihar Sharif, from Bihar Sharif to Warisaliganj via NH 20
- From Gaya Bus Stand ,Gaya to Nawada Via NH120 Nawada to Warisaliganj via SH 83 and SH8

=== Air ===
By air, Warisaliganj is well connected to some of the popular airports of Bihar, Jharkhand, and West Bengal:

- Gaya Airport, 89 kilometres (55 mi) away
- Lok Nayak Jayaprakash Airport, Patna, 113 kilometres (70 mi) away
- Deoghar Airport, Deoghar, 160 kilometres (99 mi) away
- Darbhanga Airport, Darbhanga, 189 kilometres (117 mi) away
- Birsa Munda Airport, Ranchi, 244 kilometres (152 mi) away
- Netaji Subhas Chandra Bose International Airport, Kolkata, 465 kilometres (289 mi) away

== See also ==
- Kakolat Falls
- Nalanda
- Rajgir
- Pawapuri
- Nawada
- Naromurar
- Sarkatti
