= Magahi =

Magahi or Magadhi may refer to:

- Something of, from, or related to the ancient Indian region and kingdom of Magadha
- Something of, from, or related to the Magadh division in Bihar, India
  - Magahi language, an Indo-Aryan language spoken in parts of India and Nepal
    - Magadhi Prakrit, its ancestor language
  - Magahis, speakers of that language
  - Magahi Paan, a variety of betel leaf
