= Warisaliganj railway station =

Railway station in Nawada, Bihar, India

WARISALIGANJ

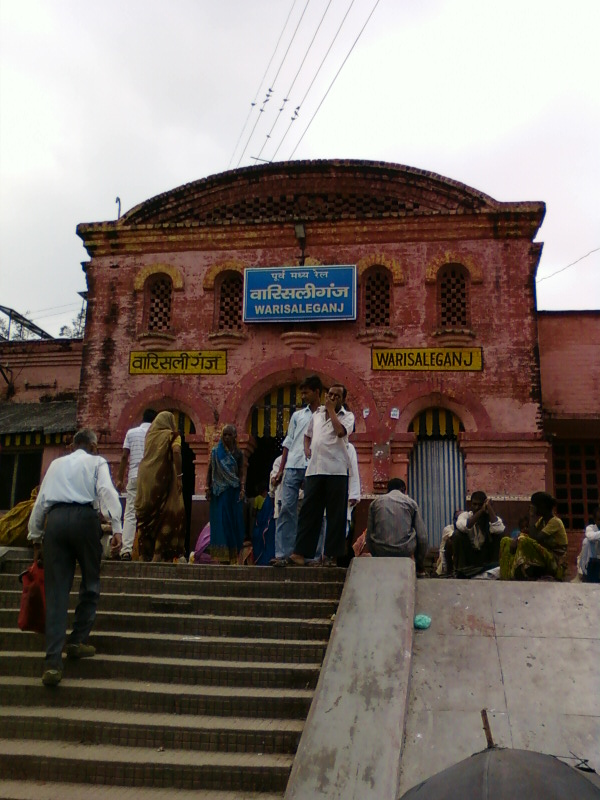

General information
- Location: Station Road, Warisaliganj, Bihar; India
- Coordinates: 24.9912°N 85.6186°E
- Elevation: 75 metres (246 ft)
- System: Indian Railways station
- Owner: Indian Railways
- Operator: East Central Railway zone
- Line: Gaya–Kiul line
- Platforms: 3
- Tracks: 5
- Connections: Auto stand, Taxi stand

Construction
- Structure type: Standard (on-ground station)
- Parking: Yes
- Cycle facilities: Yes

Other information
- Status: Functioning
- Station code: WRS
- Zone(s): East Central Railway zone
- Division(s): Danapur

History
- Electrified: 2017–2018
Location

Warisaliganj railway station (station code: WRS) is a major railway station in Nawada district, of the Indian state of Bihar.

== Line and location ==
The station lies on Tilaiya Junction–Luckeesarai Junction line of East Central Railway zone which is a part of Gaya–Kiul line

== Infrastructure ==
The station consists of three platforms and a rack point.

== Importance ==
It is also one of the important rack point for freight Wagons for Indian Railways in the Nawada district.

== Services ==
It serves Warisaliganj town to the district headquarter Nawada and other districts like Sheikhpura, Lakhisarai and Gaya. The town is served by a direct daily train to Howrah and a weekly service to Guwahati via Bhagalpur. The state capital Patna can be reached through a stop-over at Kiul Junction or Gaya Junction from where rest of India is well connected.

The following trains run through Warisaliganj railway station :

- Malda Town - Gomti Nagar Amrit Bharat Express
- Gaya–Howrah Express
- Gaya–Jamalpur Passenger (unreserved)
- Gaya–Kiul MEMU (unreserved)
- Gaya–Jhajha Fast Passenger (unreserved)
- Gaya–Kamakhya Weekly Express
- Rampurhat–Gaya Passenger (unreserved)
- Bhagalpur Delhi Amrit Bharat festival special
- Nawada Patna Fast Demu(unreserved)
