= Gaya–Kiul line =

Railway line in Bihar, India

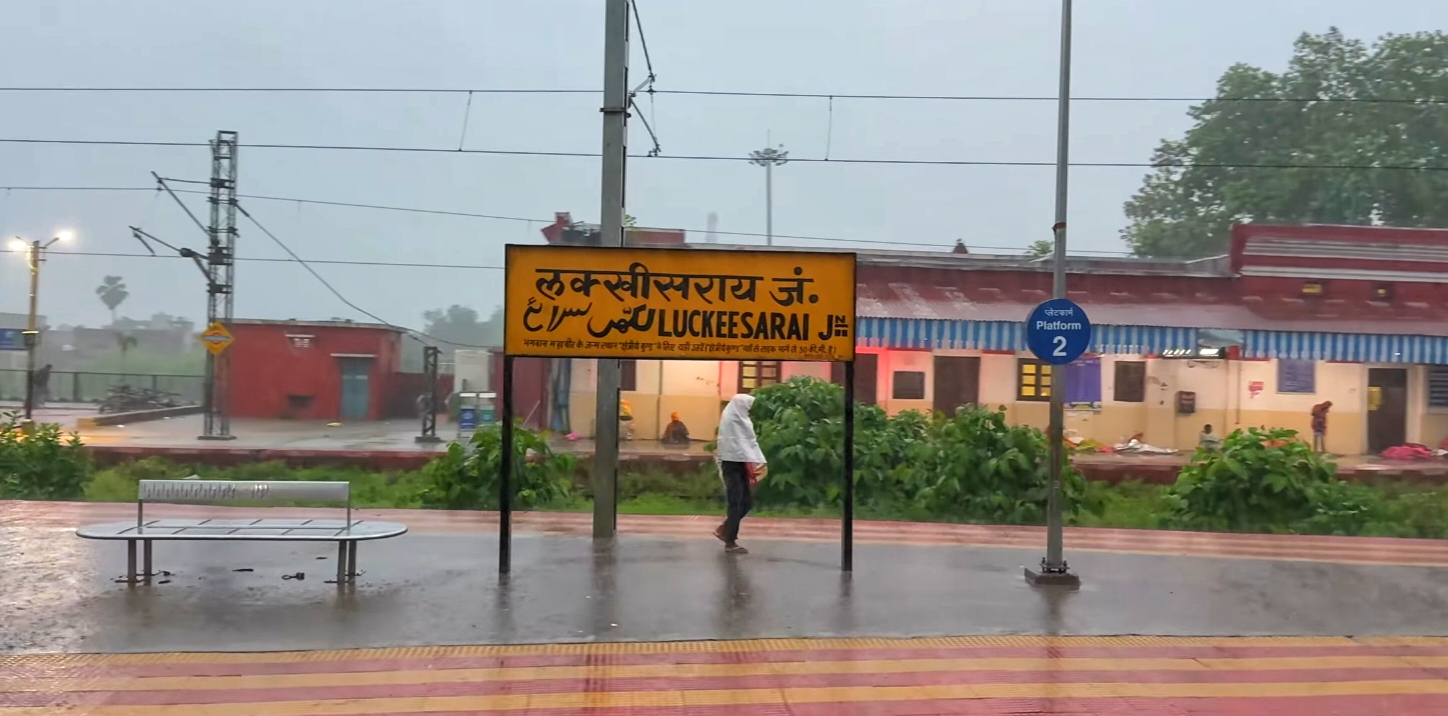
- Lakhisarai railway station

Overview
- Status: Operational
- Owner: Indian Railways
- Termini: Gaya; Kiul

Service
- Operator: East Central Railway

History
- Opened: 1879

Technical
- Line length: 129 km (80 mi)
- Number of tracks: 2 (double)
- Track gauge: 5 ft 6 in (1,676 mm) broad gauge
- Electrification: Yes
- Operating speed: 100 km/h

The Gaya–Kiul line is a railway line connecting Gaya on the Howrah–Gaya–Delhi line and Kiul on the Howrah–Delhi main line both in the Indian state of Bihar.

== History ==
Several years before the Grand Chord was built, a connection from the Howrah–Delhi main line to Gaya was developed in 1900 and the South Bihar Railway Company (operated by EIR) had laid a line from Lakhisarai to Gaya in 1879. The Grand Chord was opened on 6 December 1906.

== Rail track doubling ==
Track doubling of the 130 kilometres (81 mi) long Gaya–Kiul line was announced in the Railway Budget for 2010–2011.

To cater to the growing freight traffic, Cabinet Committee on Economic Affairs today approved the doubling of 124 km long Kiul-Gaya railway line estimated to cost Rs 1354.22 crore in March 2016. Chaired by Prime Minister Narendra Modi, the CCEA decided in favour of doubling of this line which will ease the ever increasing freight traffic between the sections.

The project is likely to benefit Lakhisarai, Sheikhpura, Nawadah and Gaya districts of Bihar and was expected to be completed by 2022–23. Doubling of this line will greatly ease the ever-increasing freight traffic between these sections. The project was likely to be completed by March 2022 but the project got delayed and new deadline is December 2023. Finally it was completed in January 2025.

Phase I: Manpur-Wazirganj - December 2019 → Commissioned

Phase II: Wazirganj - Tilaiya — September 2022 → Commissioned

Phase III: Lakhisarai-Sheikhpura — October 2022 → Commissioned

Phase IV: Sheikhpura - Tilaiya - February 2025- Commissioned

== Electrification and doubling of track ==
Feasibility studies for the electrification of the Manpur–Tilaiya–Kiul section were announced in the rail budget for 2010–11 and the electrification work of singletrack is going on starting 2015–16. electrification of single line from Gaya to Kiul have been completed in July 2018. It has been completed in two phases. In first phase Tilaiya to Warisaliganj have been completed and in the other phase Warisaliganj to Lakhisarai. The track doubling project was completed and commissioned by February 2025.

== Passenger movement ==
Gaya is the only station on this line that is amongst the top hundred booking stations of the Indian Railway. Apart from Gaya, there are various local stations used by masses such as Nawada, Sheikhpura, Warisaliganj.

Since most of the trains ply between Kiul and Gaya, passenger movement is also limited. Since Kiul is a terminal station for most of the trains, it does not have much significance as it is neither a great marketplace nor a tourist destination. so it limits the number Of passengers on this line. If more trains are run through this line to other cities like Deoghar, Asansol, Dhanbad, Ranchi, Varanasi, Delhi, and other big cities this line would certainly provide more passenger boarding and deboarding.

The Distance between Kiul to Mughalsarai is 335 km via Patna and it is 334 km via Gaya. There are more than 30 trains from Kiul to Mughalsarai via Patna but only one train via Gaya that too a weekly with only 3AC accommodation. So the actual potential of passengers on this line is not reflected by the number of trains running.

== Railway reorganisation ==
In 1952, Eastern Railway, Northern Railway and North Eastern Railway were formed. Eastern Railway was formed with a portion of East Indian Railway Company, east of Mughalsarai and Bengal Nagpur Railway. Northern Railway was formed with a portion of East Indian Railway Company west of Mughalsarai, Jodhpur Railway, Bikaner Railway, and Eastern Punjab Railway. North Eastern Railway was formed with Oudh and Tirhut Railway, Assam Railway and a portion of Bombay, Baroda and Central India Railway. East Central Railway was created in 1996–97.

== Trains ==
These are some famous trains in this route, while there are many other trains in this route.

- Deoghar-Varanasi Vande Bharat Express
- Jasidih-Pune Weekly Express
- Howrah-Gaya Express
- Gaya-Kamakhya Express
- Godda-New Delhi Humsafar Express
