= Patankar =

Patankar is an Indian surname. Notable people with the name include:

- Bharat Patankar, activist, co-founder and President of the left wing of Shramik Mukti Dal in Maharashtra
- Chandrakant Patankar (born 1930), Indian cricketer
- Indumati Babuji Patankar (1925–2017), freedom fighter and activist in Kasegaon, Maharashtra
- Prachi Patankar, community activist, writer, and educator
- R. B. Patankar (1927–2004), Marathi critic and scholar of modern aesthetics
- S. N. Patankar (died 1941) was an Indian producer, director, and cameraman
- Suhas Patankar (born 1941), Indian mechanical engineer
- Vikramsinh Patankar (born 1943), Indian politician from Maharashtra
- Wasudev Waman Patankar (1908–1997), Marathi shayar, and one of the first to pen Marathi shayari
