= Indumati Babuji Patankar =

Indian freedom fighter from Maharashtra

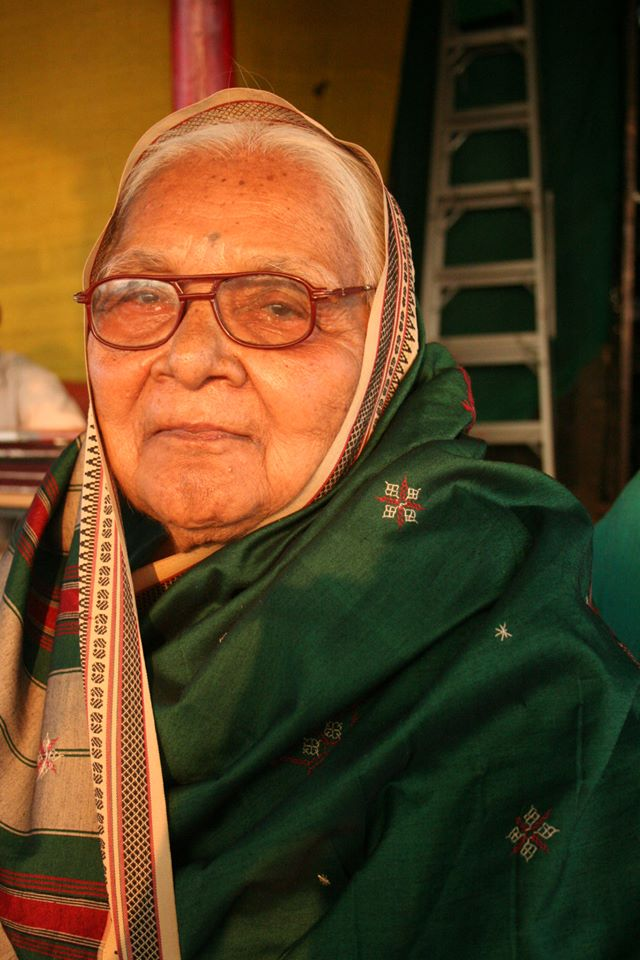
- Indutai 2015
- Born: 15 September 1925; Indoli
- Died: 14 July 2017 (aged 91)
- Other name: Indutai
- Education: High School and Education College
- Alma mater: Kasegaon Education Society, Azad Vidyalaya
- Organization: Shramik Mukti Dal
- Movement: Indian independence movement Stri Mukti Sangharsh Chalwal Shramik Mukti Dal
- Parent(s): Dinkarrao Nikam; Sarasvati Nikam

Indumati Patankar (Indutai) (1925 – 2017) was a freedom fighter and long-time veteran activist living in rural India in Kasegaon, Maharashtra. Indutai's father Dinkarrao Nikam was in the freedom movement beginning in 1930 and became a Communist when he was in jail for satyagraha and met Communist leaders like Bhai V.D. Chitale. Indutai started reading books such as Volga te Ganga when she was 10–12 years old, took part in morning processions of Congress in the village, supported the families of freedom movement leaders staying at her home in Indoli, tal. Karad. She started going to Rashtra Seva Dal.

== Personal life ==
In 1942, Indutai left her parental home at the age of 16 and joined the 1942 Independence movement against the British rule, organizing women and spreading the message of the Rashtra Seva Dal. She gradually started taking part in the underground movement of the prati sarkar by 1943, carrying arms (pistols and revolvers) to the fighters.

She married Krantivir Babuji Patankar on 1 January 1946, with whom she had fallen in love during her work with the 'Prati Sarkar'. Both were leading activists in the 'Prati Sarkar' or the parallel government movement that was part of the India's independence movement in the Satara District in the 1940s. The core of the prati sarkar lay in the one hundred or so underground activists – those who left their homes, moved from village to village serving as full timers, carrying guns or other weapons, ready to confront the police if necessary and carrying out “constructive” as well as military and administrative tasks. They were organized into groups which were effective decision-making centers for most activity. Representatives of all groups met from time to time at the district level. At the village level, these activists moved to establish various structures that included volunteer squads and to some extent panch committees chosen or elected by the villagers themselves. This village structure developed only with the movement itself in late 1944 and 1945.

Babuji and Indumati Patankar established the Kasegaon Education Society and the first high school in Kasegaon called Azad Vidyalaya. She supported Babuji in establishing the Kasegaon Education Society and became one of its first women students, and later became a primary school teacher. She supported the family by working as a teacher and going to the fields every morning and evening along with her mother-and father-in-law. She continued working as a teacher until her retirement, while continuing throughout to take part in the movement.

== Activism ==
Both Indutai and Babuji became part of the Socialist Party along with many others all over the country. Because of theoretical and political differences around 1949 they became part of the Socialist Party (Marxist–Leninist) under the leadership of Aruna Asaf Ali. Then in 1952 they became Communists.

Babuji was killed by anti-social elements in connivance with the then-controllers of the state. Indutai as a young widow single-handedly continued to raise her family, particularly their baby boy Bharat who had been born on 5 September 1949. She also continued to participate in Communist party activities. Just as her earlier maternal home Indoli had been a center of Communist activities, now Kasegaon became a center in old Satara district. She was continuously working in women's organizations, toiling peoples' movements including agricultural laborers' movement, and social work. She is the core leader Stree Mukti Sangharsh Chalwal with several other rural women fighting against violence and for survival and livelihoods. Through this work she led the struggle of parityakta (abandoned/deserted) women. This movement of parityakta women for ration cards, alimony, and recognition of their rights has gone on since 1988 in Satara, Sangli and Kolhapur districts. This was one of her special contributions.

After her son Bharat Patankar became a full-time activist in the movement, she supported him morally and economically, along with his wife Gail Omvedt, and continued taking a leading role in every activity of Shramik Mutki Dal.
