= Forward Press =

Indian magazine

- Chief editor: Ivan Kostka
- Managing editor: Pramod Ranjan
- Categories: Social issues, Politics
- Frequency: Monthly
- Publisher: Aspire Publication
- Founded: 2009
- Final issue: June 2016 (print)
- Country: India
- Based in: New Delhi
- Language: Hindi, English
- Website: www.forwardpress.in

Forward Press is an English-Hindi bilingual web publication covering issues relevant to India's backward classes (the masses) and regions. Anil Varghese is the current editor-in-chief of the publication. Forward Press started as a monthly print magazine in June 2009. Its management decided to discontinue the print edition in 2016 to convert it into a web-only publication.

== Overview ==
Forward Press was founded by Silvia Maria Fernandes Kostka and Ivan Kostka in 2009 in New Delhi. They have appointed many correspondents from several states and cities and launched the Bahujan Sahitya Catalogue. Senior journalist Pramod Ranjan served as the magazine's managing editor from 2011 to 2019.

== Controversy ==
One of the magazine issues, published an article which was alleged to be derogatory to Hindu Goddess Durga. Some student organizations with political association such as those who were associated with All India Backward Student Federation, and a student union comprising members belonging to Backward Castes and Dalit communities organised 'Mahisasura Sahadat Diwas' at Jawaharlal Nehru University due to the allegations which prompted the Delhi Police to raid the press office on a complaint filed by right-wing student unions of Jawaharlal Nehru University.

== See also ==
- Pramod Ranjan
- Gail Omvedt
- A.R. Akela
