= Gail Omvedt =

American-born Indian sociologist (1941–2021)

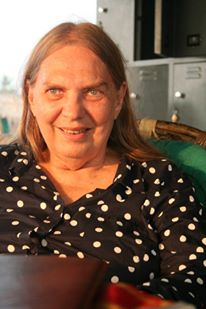
- Born: 2 August 1941; Minneapolis, Minnesota, United States
- Died: 25 August 2021 (aged 80); Kasegaon, Sangli District, Maharashtra, India
- Education: Carleton College; University of California, Berkeley
- Occupations: Writer; activist
- Spouse: Bharat Patankar (m. 1976)
- Children: Prachi Patankar
- Relatives: Indumati Babuji Patankar (mother-in-law)
- Writing career
- Period: 1970–2021
- Notable works: Dalits and the Democratic Revolution; Seeking Begumpura; We Shall Smash this Prison: Indian Women in Struggle; Reinventing Revolution: New Social Movements and the Socialist Tradition in India

Gail Omvedt (2 August 1941 – 25 August 2021) was an American-born Indian sociologist and human rights activist. Omvedt was involved in Dalit, anti-caste, environmental, farmers' and women's movements, especially with rural women.

Omvedt's dissertation was titled Cultural Revolt in a Colonial Society: The Non-Brahman Movement in Western India, 1873-1930.

Omvedt's academic writing includes numerous books and articles on class, caste and gender issues. Besides undertaking many research projects, she was a consultant for the Food and Agriculture Organization, United Nations Development Programme and Oxfam Novib. She served as a Dr Ambedkar Chair Professor at the National Institute of Social Work and Social Sciences in Odisha, a professor of sociology at the University of Pune and a guest professor at the Nordic Institute of Asian Studies in Copenhagen. She was a senior fellow at the Nehru Memorial Museum and Library and research director of the Krantivir Babuji Patankar Sanstha.

== Biography ==
Gail Omvedt was born in Minneapolis and studied at Carleton College and at UC Berkeley, where she earned her PhD in sociology in 1973. When she went to India for the first time in 1963–1964, she was an English tutor on a Fulbright fellowship. Omveldt again came to India for research in the 1970s. At that time she met her future husband, Bharat Patankar, and his social activist mother, Indumati Patankar. After marrying Bharat, she lived with her husband and his extended family in a village called Kasegaon in the state of Maharashtra. She became an Indian citizen in 1983.

In the years before her death she was working as a consulting sociologist on gender, environment and rural development for the United Nations Development Programme (UNDP), Oxfam Novib and other institutions. She was a consultant for United Nations agencies and non-governmental organizations, served as Dr Ambedkar Chair Professor at the National Institute of Social Work and Social Sciences in Odisha, professor of sociology at University of Pune, guest professor at the Nordic Institute of Asian Studies and senior fellow at the Nehru Memorial Museum and Library. She was a visiting professor and coordinator at the University of Pune's School of Social Justice and a fellow at the Indian Institute of Advanced Study. Gail Omvedt was a former Dr. B.R. Ambedkar Chair of Social Change and Development at Indira Gandhi National Open University. Omvedt died on 25 August 2021 in Maharashtra at the age of 80.

== Activism ==
Omvedt worked with social movements in India, including the Dalit anti-caste, environmental , farmers' and rural women's movements. She was active in Shramik Mukti Dal Stri Mukti Sangarsh Chalval, which works with abandoned women in the Sangli and Satara districts of southern Maharashtra, and the Shetkari Mahila Aghadi, which works on issues of women's land rights and political power.

== Views ==
Gail Omvedt was an Ambedkarite scholar who contributed immensely to the anti-caste movement. Omvedt was critical of the Hindu religious texts (or what she specifically regarded as "Brahminism") for what she argued is their promotion of a caste-based society.

In addition to her criticism of their purported advocacy for the caste system, Omvedt also dismissed the Hindu tradition of venerating the Vedas as holy. In a 2000 open letter published in The Hindu addressed to then-BJP President Bangaru Laxman, she gave her perspective on the Rigveda:

As for the Vedas, they are impressive books, especially the Rg Veda. But to take them as something holy? Read them for yourself! Most of the hymns are for success in war, cattle-stealing, love-making and the like. They celebrate conquest; the hymns about Indra and Vrtra sound suspicious as if the Aryans were responsible for smashing dams built by the Indus Valley people; though archaeologists tell us there is no evidence for direct destruction by "Aryan invasion", the Rg Veda gives evidence of enmity between the Aryans and those they called dasyus, panis and the like.

Omvedt posits that Hindutva groups foster an ethnic definition of Hinduism based on geography, ancestry and heritage to create solidarity amongst various castes, despite the prevalence of caste-based discrimination.

Omvedt endorsed the stand taken by Dalit activists at the 2001 World Conference against Racism that caste discrimination is similar to racism in regarding discriminated groups as "biologically inferior and socially dangerous."

She called the United States a "racist country" and has advocated for affirmative action; however, she compared American positive-discrimination policies favorably to those of India, stating:

It is a sad comment on the state of Indian industrialists' social consciousness that such discussions have begun in an organised way in the U.S. before they have been thought of in India itself.

With respect to perceptions of "group performance," in the United States and India, Omvedt wrote:

Whereas the U.S. debate assumes an overall equal distribution of capacity among social groups, in India the assumption seems to be that the unequal showing of different caste groups on examinations, in education, etc. is a result of actual different capacities.

She on occasion supported big dam projects and genetically modified crops.

== Criticism ==
=== Caste discrimination as racism ===
Omvedt's portrayal of caste discrimination as a form of racism was opposed by the Indian government and some other sociologists in India, including André Beteille, who while acknowledging that discrimination exists, opposed treating caste as a form of racism "simply because we want to protect [caste-discriminated people] against prejudice and discrimination," describing such attempts as "politically mischievous" and "worse, scientifically nonsense." Beteille argued:

We cannot throw out the concept of race by the front door when it is misused for asserting social superiority and bring it in again through the back door to misuse it for the cause of the oppressed. The metaphor of race is a dangerous weapon whether it is used for asserting white supremacy or for making demands on behalf of disadvantaged groups.

=== Marxist critique ===
Omvedt has been criticized for perceived anti-statist bias and neoliberal economic sympathies in her writing. Some scholars have also questioned the sincerity of her appeals to authenticity:

Omvedt is transformed from a dangerous American outsider to a revolutionary insider, a player of a song proclaiming: 'We will cut the throats of the rich!' [...] These words, which, written and sung though they are by anonymous labourers, can be heard only through Omvedt's (technological) agency. The rest, as they say, is history. [WWSP!] unsubtly suggests what Omvedt does not say explicitly--that she has accepted the leadership role thrust upon her by the initially skeptical masses.

== Selected works ==
- Cultural Revolt in a Colonial Society: The NonBrahman Movement in Maharashtra (Scientific Socialist Education Trust, 1976)
- We Will Smash This Prison!: Indian Women in Struggle (Zed Books, 1980)
- Violence Against Women: New Movements And New Theories In India (Kali for Women, 1990)
- Reinventing Revolution: New Social Movements in India (M. E. Sharpe, 1993)
- Dalits And The Democratic Revolution: Dr. Ambedkar And The Dalit Movement In Colonial India (Sage Publishing, 1994)
- Gender and Technology: Emerging Visions from Asia (with Govind Kelkar; Asian Institute of Technology, 1995)
- Dalit Visions: the Anti-caste movement and Indian Cultural Identity (Orient Longman, 1995)
- Growing Up Untouchable in India: A Dalit Autobiography (as translator, written by Vasant Moon; Rowman and Littlefield, 2000)
- Buddhism in India: Challenging Brahmanism and Caste (Sage Publishing, 2003)
- Ambedkar: Towards an Enlightened India (Penguin Books, 2004)
- Jotirao Phule & the Ideology of Social Revolution in India (Critical Quest, 2004)
- Seeking Begumpura: The Social Vision of Anticaste Intellectuals (Navayana, 2008)
- Understanding Caste: From Buddha To Ambedkar And Beyond (Orient Blackswan, 2011)
- The Songs of Tukoba (as translator with Bharat Patankar, written by Tukaram; Manohar, 2012)

== Awards ==
- Honorary Woodrow Wilson Fellowship, 1964–65
- Fulbright fellowship, 1963-1964
- University of California Graduate Fellowships, 1964–65, 1965–66
- American Institute of Indian Studies Junior Fellowship, 1971
- American Association of University Women Fellowship, 1975
- Savitribai Phule Puraskar, 2002
- Dr. Ambedkar Chetna Award, 2003
- ABP Majha Sanman Puraskar, 2012
- Matoshree Bhimabai Ambedkar Award, 2012
- Maharshi Vitthal Ramji Shinde Award, 2015
- Indian Sociological Society Lifetime Achievement Award, 2018

== See also ==
- Eleanor Zelliot
- Forward Press
