= Pramod Ranjan =

Indian journalist and social worker

Promod Ranjan
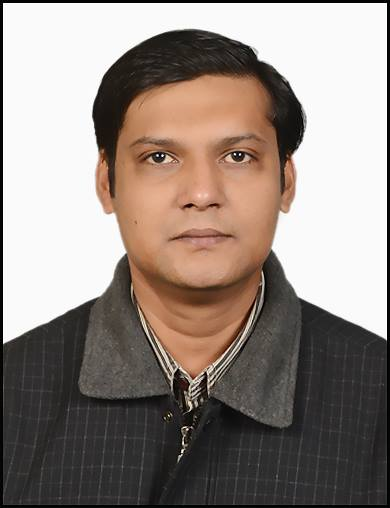
- Born: 1980 (age 45–46); Patna, Bihar
- Citizenship: Indian
- Education: Jawaharlal Nehru University, Delhi
- Occupations: Journalist author social work

Pramod Ranjan (born in February 1980) is an Indian author, social worker and journalist. He has worked for Bharatendu Shikhar (Shimla), Gram Parivesh, Dhramshala based Divya Himachal, Punjab Kesari, Dainik Bhaskar, and Amar Ujala. He was managing editor of the Forward Press magazine from 2011 to 2019.

== Early life ==
Pramod Ranjan was born on 22 February 1980 in Patna, Bihar. He attended government primary and secondary schools in Nalanda district. Ranjan did M.Phil. (Social concerns of Phaniswarnath Renu's journalism) and PhD Scholar at JNU, New Delhi where he wrote dissertations titled "Social Concerns of Phaniswarath Renu's Journalism" and "The Question of Liberation from Caste in Novels by Non-Dwij Hindi Authors". He is known for his engaging, writings on society, politics and internal democracy in the media in northern India.

== Career in journalism ==
=== Literary and cultural contributions ===
Pramod Ranjan's journalistic focus has been the rights of the Backward Classes, Adivasis, Dalits and other oppressed communities. He has tried to bring the discourse on OBC-Dalit issues from the margins of Hindi literature to the mainstream. He is credited with the misinterpretation of many Hindu legends in the name of Bahujan angle. He has also justified it by claiming it as the Bahujan cultural movement by glorified it by presenting it as "lies" fed to the media regarding the Mahishasur Martyrdom Day celebrations organized by JNU students. He tried to show that the RSS discredit this movement by attributing it to the organizations of the Far Left and terming it anti-national.

He also worked as one of the two editors of socio- political monthly Jan Vikalp published from Patna. since January 2007 to March 2008. He was Senior Correspondent in Patna Bureau of ‘Prabhat Khabar’ March 2008 to January 2010. He joined Forward Press as Managing Editor from May 2011– to November 2013 and appointed its Consulting Editor from November 2013. Pramod Ranjan completed seven years with Forward Press. Now it is currently published under the supervision of Mr. Ranjan.

== Books ==
- Hindi Sahityotihas Ka Bahujan Paksha (Edited) Ananya Prakashan, New Delhi (2016)
- Mahishasur: Ek Jannayak (edited), The Marginalised Prakashan, Wardha (2016). Also available in English under the title Mahishasur: A People's Hero
- Bahujan Sahitya ke Prastavna (edited), The Marginalised Prakashan, Wardha (2016). Also available in English under the title The Case for Bahujan Literature
- Periyar ke Pratinidhi Vichar (edited), The Marginalised Prakashan, Wardha (2016)
- Bhagana Ki Nirbhayaein (Edited with H. L. Dusadh & Jitendra Yadav) Dushadh Prakashan, Lucknow (2014)
- Bahujan Rajniti Ki Nai Umeed: Jitan Ram Manjhi (Edited with H. L. Dusadh & Jitendra Yadav) Dushadh Prakashan, Lucknow (2014)
- Media Main Hissedari (Writer) Pragya Samajik Sodha Sansthan, Patna, Bihar (2009)
- Baad: Ek Ankahi Kahani, Freethinkers, Patna, Bihar (2008)

== Controversies ==
- Famous Dalit writer Kanwal Bharti posted a comment on Facebook wall against about him.
- In 2014, Delhi Police raided Forward Press office and seized print magazines after an FIR by two fanatics. The action of Delhi police was criticized by many scholars, organizations than as Forward Press Magazine, a Hindi-English bilingual monthly of Dalits and Bahujans, and forcibly seized copies of their October special issue on Bahujan Sramana Tradition'बहुजन-श्रमण परंपरा विशेषांक' along with arresting four employees. Dalit magazine in its October issue published an article derogatory to Hindu Goddess Durga and Delhi Police raided the office of Forward Press and reportedly confiscated copies of the magazine's October issue, who is being maliciously targeted and threatened with arrest has stated in a press release that the October issue of the magazine has attempted a Bahujan reading of the story of Mahishasur and Durga through the medium of pictures and essays. AIBSF celebrated Mahisasur's birthday at JNU campus on the same day 9 October
