= Shramik Mukti Dal =

Socio-political organization

Shramik Mukti Dal (toilers’ liberation league) is a socio-political organization in Maharashtra, India. It is an organization working in eleven districts of Maharashtra, organizing farmers and toilers on issues of drought, dam and project eviction, and caste oppression. The Shramik Mukti Dal (SMD) follows an ideology not simply based on Marxism but on Marx-Phule-Ambedkarism.

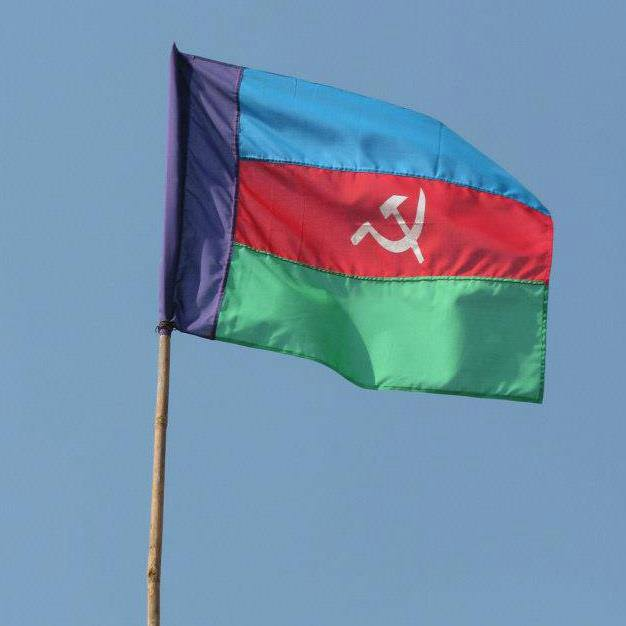
Smdflag1

SMD has been instrumental in waging a movement for water rights for more than two decades. Much of development was uncontrolled, rapacious excavation of sand from riverbeds for the construction industry in drought-prone areas of Western Maharashtra, which had led to the drying up of the wells in the nearby farms. SMD along with local communities, socially committed ecological engineers, science-activists and other activists, progressive intellectuals, and media people led a prolonged, successful struggle to stop this unlimited excavation of this sand and built the Baliraja dam. This idea came out of detailed discussions with the people of the villages -Balawadi and Tandulwadi on the two sides of the river Yerala. The idea was that people in the villages will receive preferential right to excavate a limited amount of sand in the river in their village, sell it after paying due royalty to the government. This money financed finance the Baliraja dam, which helped eliminate the effects drought in these two villages.

Some of the leading members include Bharat Patankar (President and Full-time Organizer], Waharu Sonawane(Vice President and well-known Adivasi poet and activist), Sampat Desai (National Organizer), Indutai Patankar, Gail Omvedt, Mukti Sadhna (Shramik Muktiwadi Yuva Sanghatna), Rahul Savita (Shramik Muktiwadi Yuva Sanghatna), Shailesh Sawant (Shramik Muktiwadi Yuva Sanghatna).

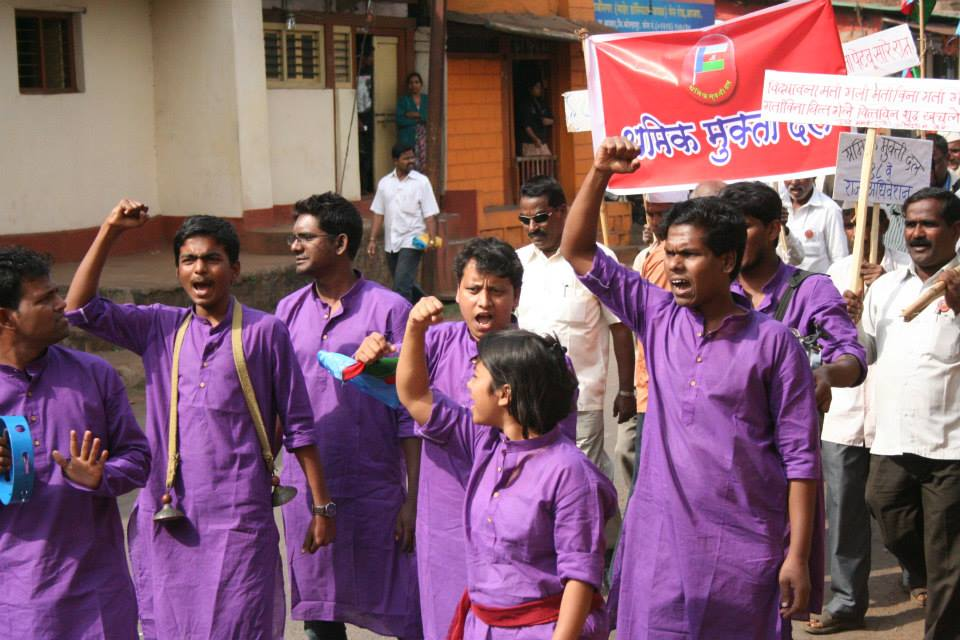
Smdyouth1

== History ==
Shramik Mukti Dal was founded in the 1980s by activists in Maharashtra, influenced not only by the radical Marxist movement but also by feminists and anti-caste movements. The Shramik Mukti Dal fights for alternatives in today's inequalitarian, caste, class and gender-ridden ecologically unsustainable society. The following have been some of its accomplishments:

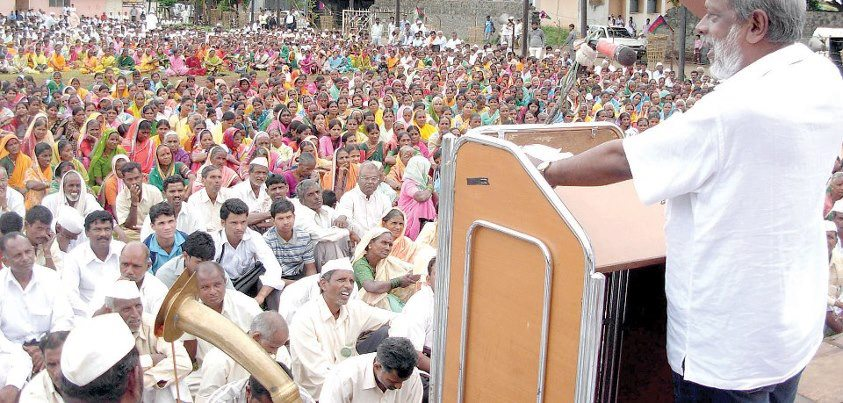
Smd2013

- The initial effort was a peasant-built and managed small dam, the Bali Raja Dam. This came out of the movement fighting drought in Khanapur taluka of Sangli district. Farmers saw the sand being auctioned from the dried-up river bed, so much that it was depleting the water aquifers and increasing the drought. They said, "Why don’t we stop this, use the sand once for funds to build our own dam which will seal in the water and irrigate our lands" After a struggle of many years the dam was built, with careful removal of the sand and providing water according to the principles of SMD on an equalitarian basis: even the landless would get a share of water. It remains the only dam built and managed by the people.
- SMD has recognized the necessity of an autonomous cultural movement. It has been instrumental in starting such movements and is a part of the Balijan cultural movement at the national level. At present a major campaign is the "Vithal-Rukmai mukti andolan." A state high court decision regarding the Vitthala temple at Pandharpur, the most popular in Maharashtra, turned the management over to a committee, with several obnoxious provisos: that it be made up only of "Hindus" (when the entire movement always included Muslims and others as well); that the purush sukta which was the earliest proclamation of caste-varna be recited (which is against the anti-caste and anti-Vedic principles of the movement); that priests wear silken clothes (which is against the "bahujan" nature of the deity). The SMD is fighting to have these clauses removed from the act, and to turn the temple management over to a committee chosen from the Varkaris, made up of men and women in equal numbers and with representation of all castes.

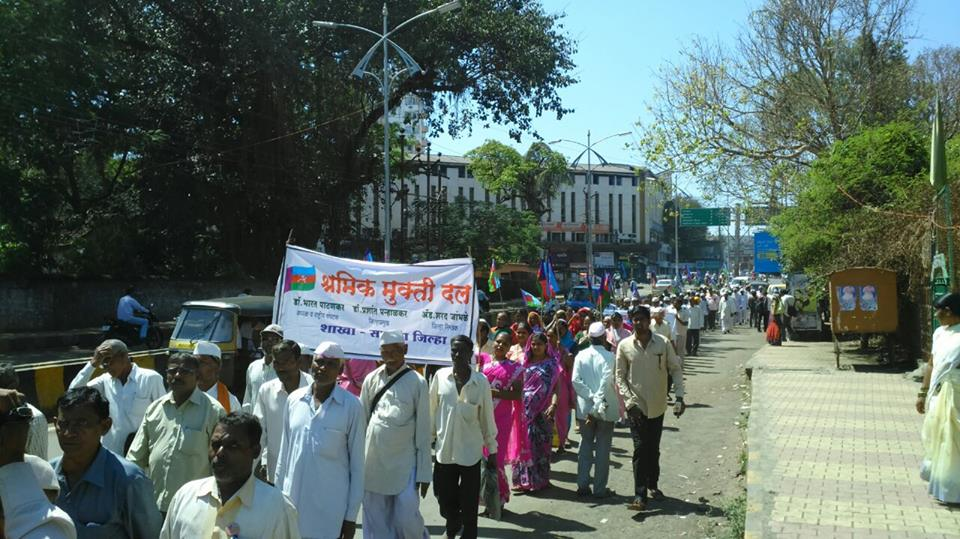
SMD 2011

- In regard to the notorious SEZs, the SMD has led a movement in Alibag taluka of Raigad district against a thermal power project of the Tata and Reliance groups. It is the only movement which has succeeded in stopping such a huge project. The alternative it has offered is for a "people’s SEZ" in which farmers would keep ownership of their land and themselves install various ecologically sustainable energy-producing devices. .["Towards a prosperous and Beautiful Konkan: An Alternative Energy Plan to the Proposed Power Projects in the Konkan" (SMD, n.d.).

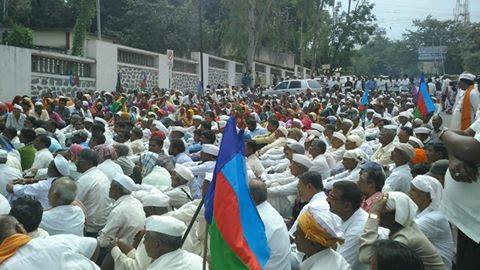
Smd sitin

- The building of windmills has been an important recent project of the government, turning land over to huge multinational companies. These have been forcibly acquiring the land at very low rates from the farmers. With the argument that "the wind over our land is ours" and we have the right to a share in the development that windmills provide, the farmers in Sangli and Satara districts have fought for keeping ownership of the land and giving it on lease to the companies at the rate of Rs 200,000 per acre. In addition, the village panchayats get Rs 15,000 per megawatt per year from the energy generated. Its victory has been to force the government to agree to these principles.

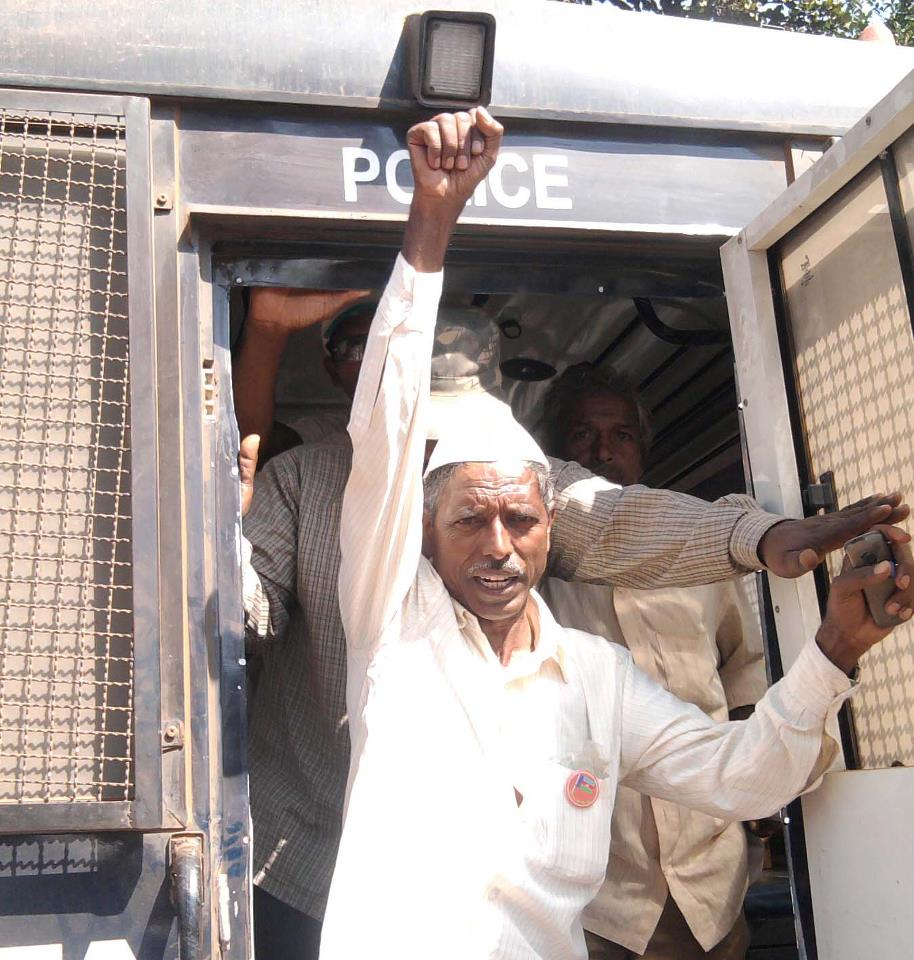
SMD Dam Affected people's resistance - Arrested members

- SMD leads one of the biggest movement of dam evictees in Maharashtra and most advanced in India. The movement does not oppose dams as such but has several main principles. It has proposed and won changes that reduce the land submerged and the number of evictees. "First rehabilitation, then the dam," is another principle. Then, farmers are given land within the command area where the irrigation will benefit them as well, and have been collected a "water allowance" until the irrigation is completed. Fights regarding several dams – Uchangi, Urmode, Wang, -- in eight districts of Maharashtra have been carried out on this basis. Finally, women among the dam evictees are recognized as independent holders of rehabilitated land.

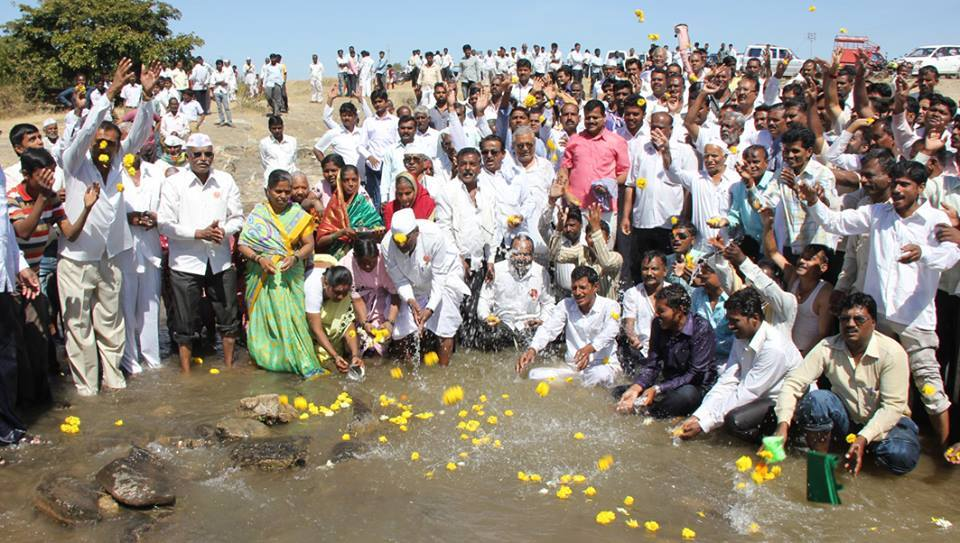
Smddrought

- Through supporting its women's wing, Stree Mukti Sangharsh, Stri Mukti Sangarsh Calval (Women's Liberation Struggle Movement; after SMS) that was founded in March 1985 worked on issues of drought and water in Khanapur taluka of Sangli district. It took up the slogan of "hirvi dharti, stri shakti, manav mukti" (green earth, women's power, human liberation). Women in Stree Mukti Sangharsh came from general anti-drought movements and also took up issues as alcoholism, dowry deaths, atrocities against women, and discrimination on Employment Guarantee Scheme's schemes. One of the worst issues faced women in the area were by deserted women came from all castes and communities. "Deserted women, cast-away women, thrown away women or parityakta- taklelya striya are different terms used interchangeably for women who are thrown out of their marital homes or in some cases who have chosen to step out themselves." SMS/SMD has led a long struggle with the deserted women "parityaktas" to get plots of land from the government, land that was allotted to 'homeless' people. After decades of organizing they won the land. They continue to fight to keep the land.
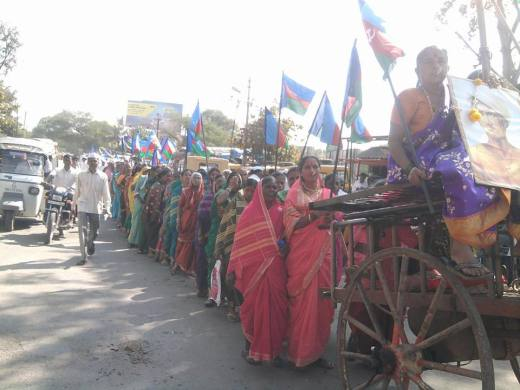
  SMD Adhiveshan

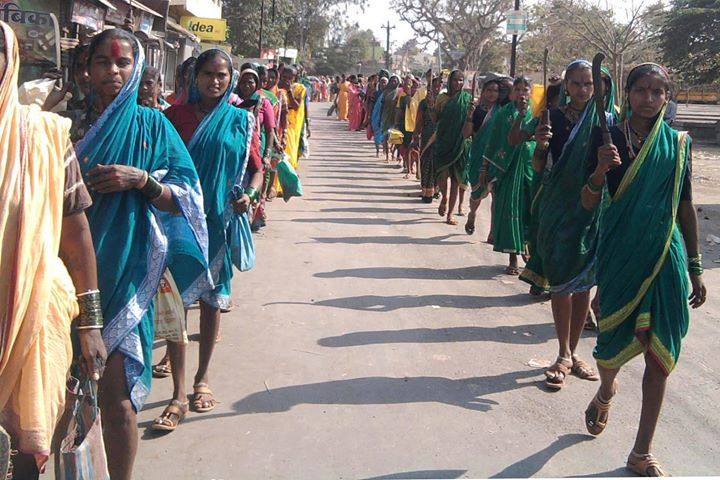
Smdwomen

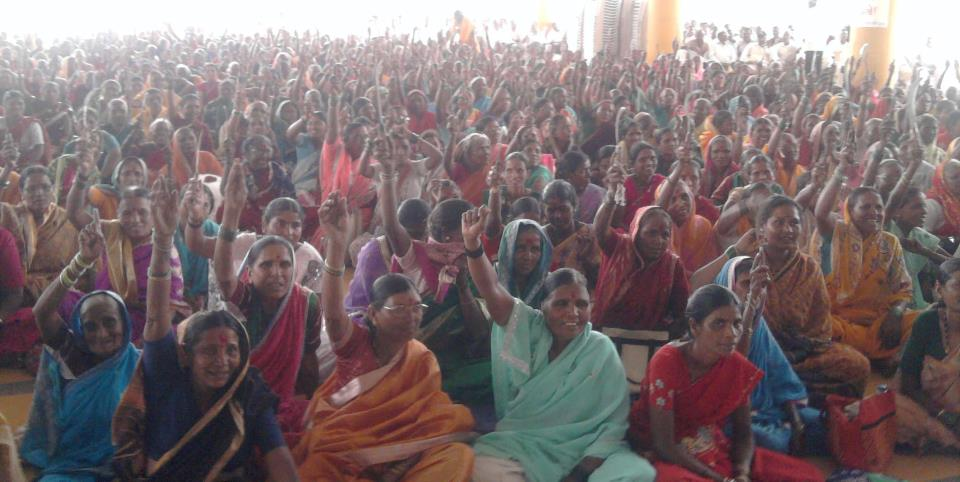
SMD open session

Shramik Mukti Dal leads a movement of equitable water distribution from 1983 onwards. It was successful in forcing the government to change the plans of the command areas from inequitable basis to equitable water distribution patterns, thereby providing minimum water of sustainability by doing agriculture, etc. In 2005, the Government of Maharashtra approved Tasgaon-Atpadi Equitable Water Distribution Alternative, awarding water rights, even to the landless. SMD is a major leading constituent of the Pro-People Water Strategy Form (Loiabhimukh Pani Dhoran Sangarsh Manch). Caste annihilation movement: by organizing caste annihilation conferences, SMD has started a struggle on the basis of a practical program going towards caste annihilation. I has been taking lead in fighting against atrocities on dalits and other oppressed castes

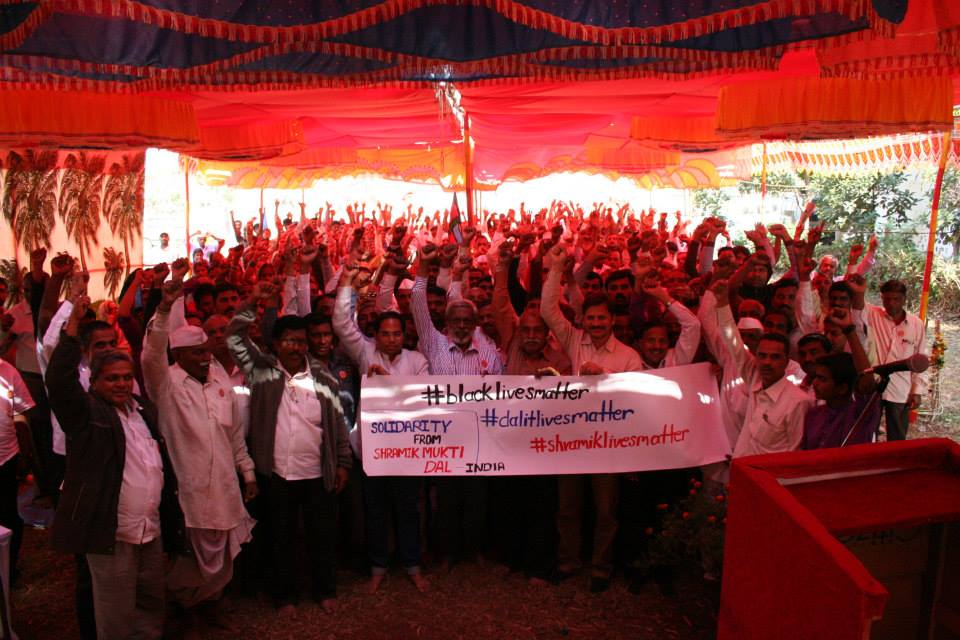
Smdblacklives

== Manifesto ==
An excerpt from the SMD manifesto:

A revolution that creates a new ecologically balanced, prosperous, non-exploitative society is not an "event" that takes place in one day. It is necessary to start this process of revolutionary transformation from today itself. Briefly, revolution is not a single "event" but a "process" that makes change. It is a process of striking one blow after another against the roots of the established capitalist, casteist, patriarchal, social-economic structure, and establishing again and again the roots creating the new society. It is a process of new creation.
