= Prachi Patankar =

Indian-American community activist

Personal details
- Born: Kasegaon, India.
- Parent(s): Bharat Patankar (father); Gail Omvedt (mother)
- Occupation: Writer, Activist, Philanthropy

Prachi Patankar is a community activist, writer, and educator. She was a cofounder of South Asia Solidarity Initiative, and 3rd I New York. Patankar has published articles on topics such as caste system in India, Hindutva, racism, cultural appropriation, foreign policy, and international conflict.

== Early life and education ==
Prachi Patankar was born in Maharashtra, India. Prachi grew up in rural India, raised by a freedom-fighter grandmother and parents deeply involved in peasant social movements. She established a school for children of people displaced by dams. For two decades in New York City, she has been part of movements against war, police brutality, and racism.

== Career ==
Prachi Patankar has worked for organizations concerned with social justice in New York City, the United States, Asia, and the wider world. She serves on the Board of CAAAV: Organizing Asian Communities At the J.M.Kaplan Fund, she shaped the Foundation’s grantmaking strategies for criminal justice reform and immigrant rights. At the Brooklyn Community Foundation, she led a strategy focused on investing in youth, racial justice, and neighborhood-led grantmaking. Previously, Prachi worked at the Lower Manhattan Cultural Council and at the Tenement Museum.

She is one of the founding members of South Asia Solidarity Initiative and 3rd I New York. South Asia Solidarity Initiative is an organization dedicated to educating and advocating about social justice issues related to South Asia. 3rd I New York was an organization that hosted a monthly showcase for film, video, and media presentations to advertise the diverse images of South and Central Asians, and, later, members of the Middle Eastern community.

== Publications and Activism ==
Prachi Patankar has written numerous articles that have been published in The Guardian, Al Jazeera, Women's Studies Quarterly, and many others. She has also appeared on Democracy Now.

On the 2011 Occupy Wall Street Movement, Patankar noted, "I have never seen such commitment anytime before... Each day more and more people are joining the protests not only in New York but in many cities in America and Europe. People who were hardly activists are now finding themselves energized."

Patankar has addressed issues of cultural appropriation, most notably in an article she wrote for jadaliyya.com. She mentions that the popularity of the practice of yoga in the United States has led the Hindu American Foundation to create a campaign entitled "Take Back Yoga," which dictates that yoga must be credited to Hinduism. Patankar notes how this is an Islamophobic sentiment, stating that "Neither contemporary 'yoga' nor 'Hinduism' is age-old or homogenous. Actually, both were assembled in the nineteenth and twentieth centuries, in interaction with British colonial realities." She brings the article to an important point on the topic of appropriation at large: "Of course, there is then anger about that too... about 'white people' assuming that a South Asian-looking person knows how to pronounce these Sanskrit words. But aren’t many privileged South Asian Americans culturally appropriating and 'colonizing' the culture of peoples who actually live in South Asia?"
