= Bharat Patankar =

Indian politician

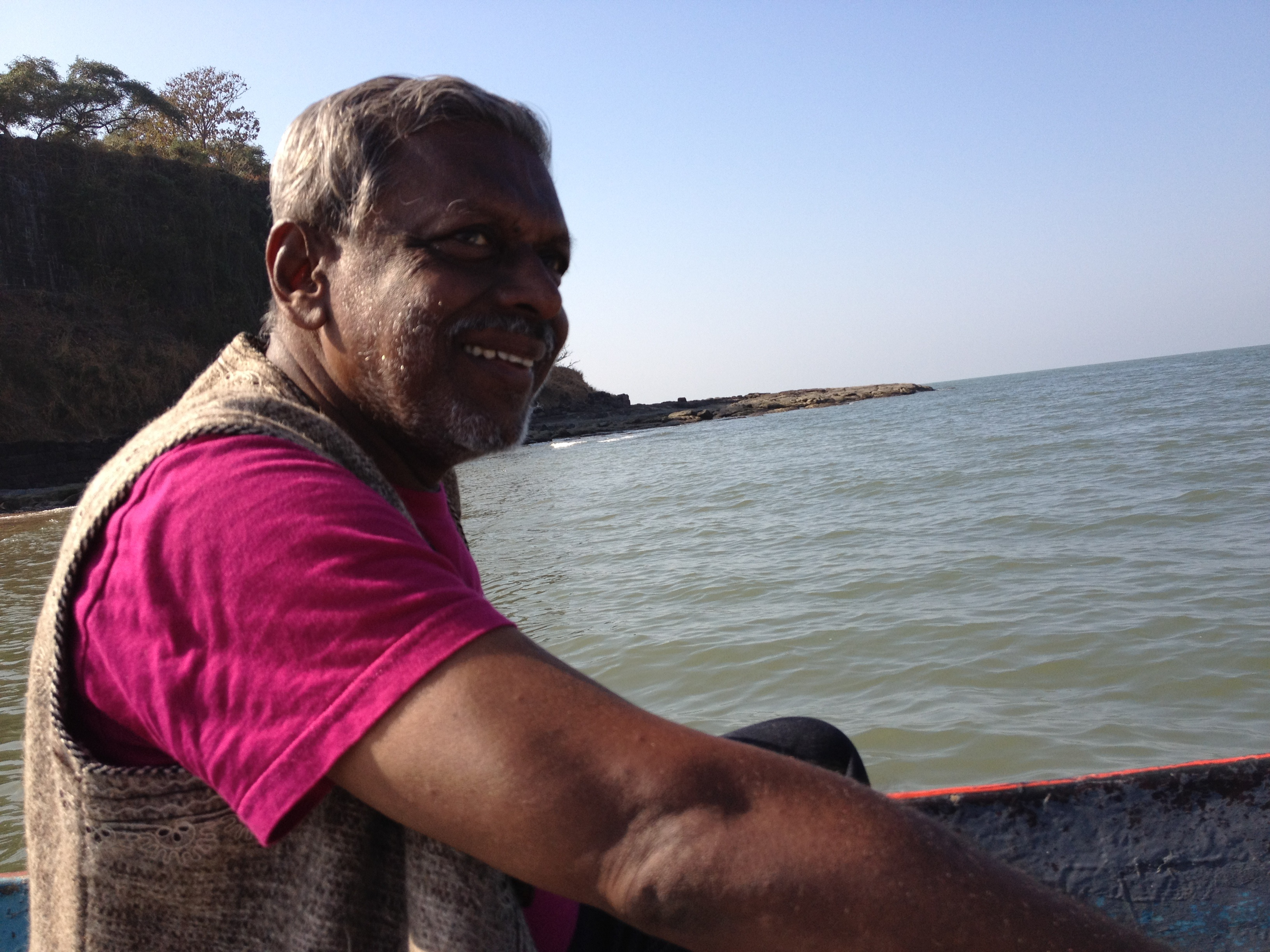
- Bharat Patankar

Personal details
- Born: 5 September 1949 Kasegaon, Sangli Maharashtra, India
- Spouse: Gail Omvedt (m. 1976–2021)
- Children: Prachi Patankar
- Parent(s): Indumati Babuji Patankar; Babuji Patankar
- Education: Azad Vidyalay; Miraj Medical College; Shivaji University
- Awards: Dalit Mitra Puraskar; Arun LImaye Yuva Jagar Puraskar; Samajik Krutadnyata Puraskar

Bharat Patankar is a leading activist (co-founder and President) of the left wing of Shramik Mukti Dal and of the peasant movement in Maharashtra. Bharat Patankar is an activist who has worked for almost 40 years in movements of workers, farmers, dam evictees, agricultural labourers, the drought eradication movement, alternative cultural movement, women's liberation movement, anti-SEZ and coal-based power plant movement based on alternative energy proposals, rights of farmers on windmills, and radical anti-caste movements. He was married to writer and activist, Gail Omvedt until her death in 2021.

== Early life ==
Bharat Patankar was born on 5 September 1949 in a village called Kasegoan, Dist. Sangli near Satara and Kolhapur in the Indian state of Maharashtra. He comes from land labourer/farmer family and grew up working on the family farm in rural India. He is the son of famous freedom fighters Babuji Patankar and Indumati Patankar, both of whom were leading activists in the ‘Prati Sarkar’, the parallel government movement that was part of India's independence movement in the Satara District in the 1940s. The core of the Prati Sarkar lay in the one hundred or so underground activists – those who left their homes, moved from village to village serving as full timers, carrying guns or other weapons, ready to confront the police if necessary, and carrying out "constructive" as well as military and administrative tasks. They were organised into groups, which were effective decision-making centers for most activities. Representatives of all groups met from time to time at the district level. At the village level, these activists moved to establish various structures that included volunteer squads, and to some extent, committees chosen or elected by the villagers themselves. This village structure developed only with the movement itself in late 1944 and 1945. Babuji and Indumati Patankar established the Kasegaon Education Society and the first High School in Kasegaon called Azad Vidyalaya.

He received his MD degree in Gynecology at Government Medical College, Miraj He has been a full-time activist since 1973. He has participated in numerous movements since then and has led many struggles from urban textile workers to rural farmers and labourers fighting for equal water and land rights. He had been a close associate of Dalit Panther activists in early period as part of the then-existing Magowa group. In the second phase of Dalit Panthers he was closely connected to Arun Kamble etc. He practices Navayana Buddhism

== Activism ==
Bharat Patankar is one of the architects of equitable water distribution movement in Maharashtra. Presumably, he was one of the rare contributors doing a synthesis of Marx, Phule, Ambedkar, Gramsci, etc. in a new theoretical perspective. He was also one of the rare contributors interpreting the existing contemporary caste system at a theoretical level. He was part of a street play group, the collective writer of the plays, a songwriter, and a performer in Samagra Sadak Natak Calwal. He was one of the founding members of Krantiba Phule Sanskritic Manch in Mumbai during the late 1970s. He is a leading activist in the Badwe Hatao movement of Vidrohi Sanskritic Calval and is still leading the movement of Vithoba-Rakhumai Mukti Andolan for deleting recitation of "purush sukta" from the Pandharpur Mandir rites provided for in the Mandir Act.

He also helped with the following irrigation and dam movements:

- Bali Raja Memorial Dam
- Uchangi dam alternative - Founding member
- Mukti Sangarsh movement Member
- Magowa group
- 1973-76 — Trade Union mobilisations: activist with Kapad Kamgar Sanghatana, Mumbai
- 1976-83 — Work with engineering and chemical workers
- AITUC and Workers’ Democratic Union
- 1973-76 — Ambarnath-Kalyan industrial belt

== Awards and honours ==
He has received the following awards:

- Arun LImaye Yuva Jagar Puraskar of Chhatra Bharati; Samajik Krutadnyata Puraskar, Dalit Mitra Puraskar and several others.
- Baburao Bagul Gaurav Puraskar Award

== Books and writings ==
His numerous books and articles include 20 English articles and books:

- "Characteristics of Contemporary Caste System and its Annihilation," in Two Essays on Caste, Mumbai:University of Mumbai 2013, 3–5 January 2014
- 24 Marathi articles and books, most notably
  - Maharashtrace Shilpakar Nana Patil (2002),
  - Mudda Ahe Jag Badalnyaca (1989),
  - Mukta Arthavyavyastha ani Vargiya, Jatiya, Laingik Shoshan (1996),
  - Mahatma Phule ani Sanskritik Sangarsh, (1991, 1998),
  - "Hindu ki Sindhu:" Sanghparivaracya Raktapipasu Hindutvavadala Burkhaphad Uttar (1993)
  - Paryayi Vikas Niti (1991),
  - Kavita Zepavnarya Pankhanci (2009; a collection of poems).

He has presented at numerous seminars and conferences including most recently:

- "Who is a worthy Being?" Interdisciplinary National Seminar, University of Mumbai (2013);
- Echoes of Ghadar convening, New York (2013);
- 2nd MenEngage Global Symosium, New Delhi(2014);
- 'Dalit Critical 'Public': Reviewing the Contribution of Asmitadarsh, Sugava and Independent Archive Ambedkarian Thought, University of Mumbai (2014).

== Gallery ==
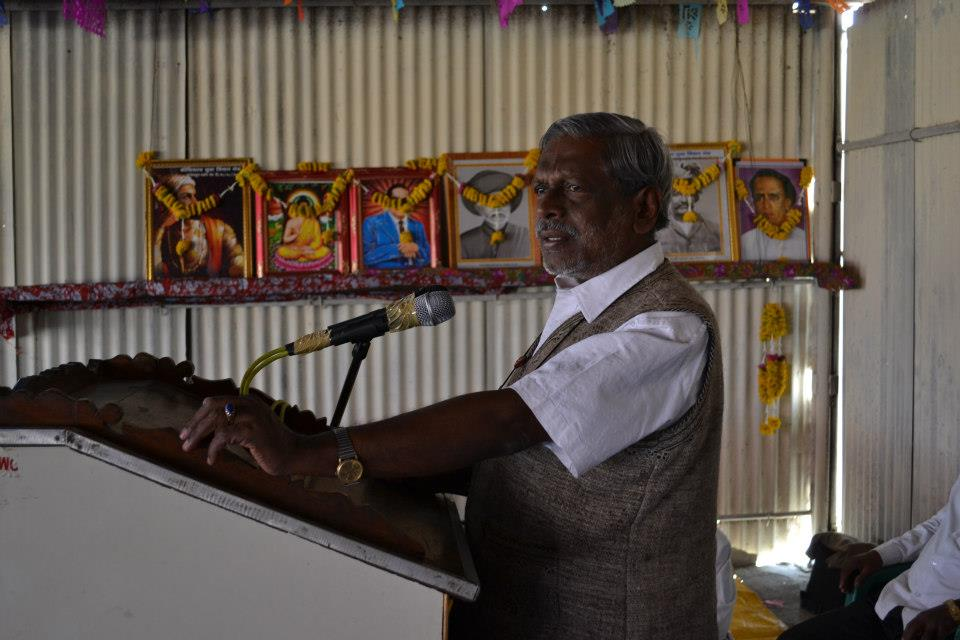
Patankar

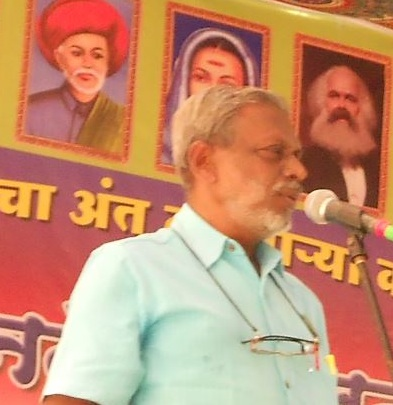
Patankar

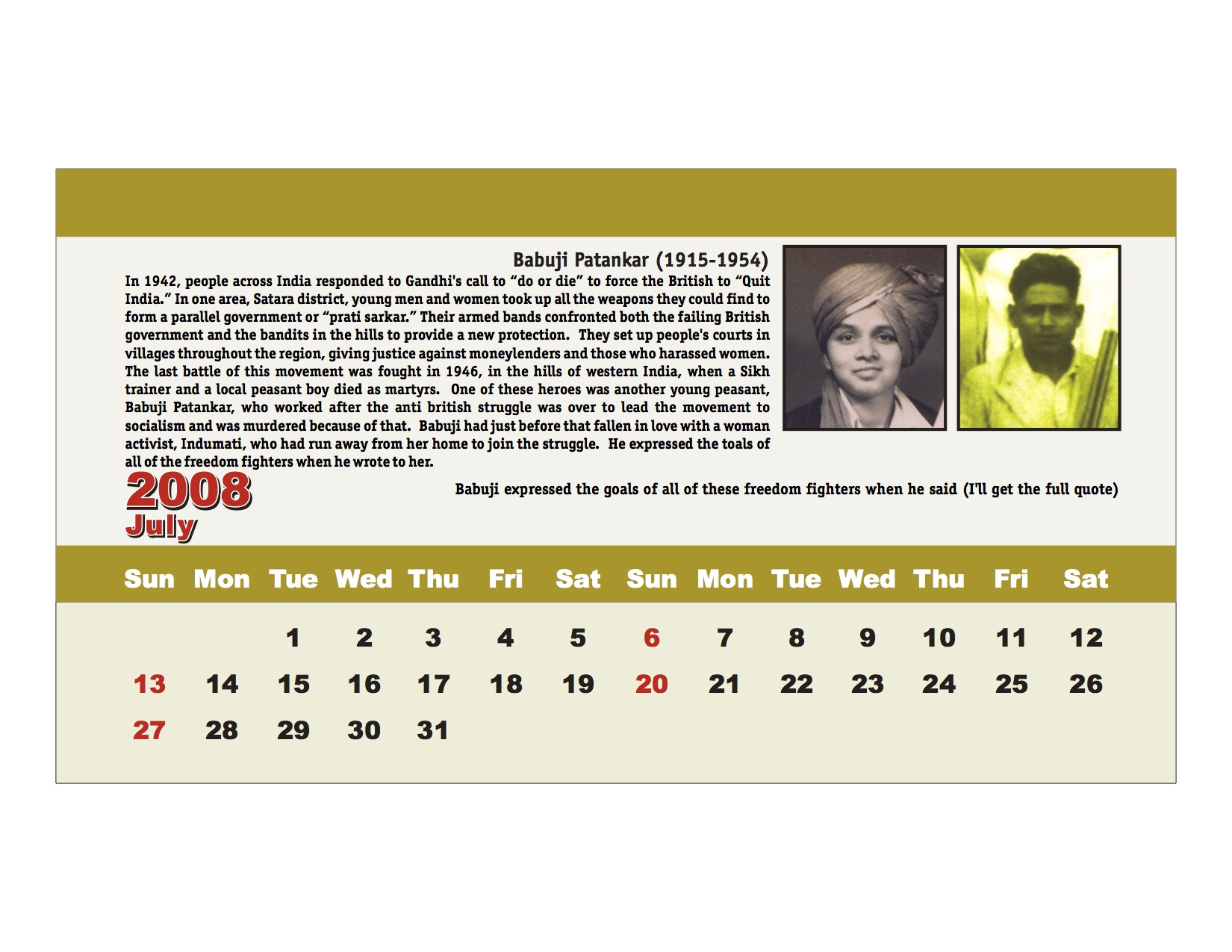
Babjui and Indumati Patankar

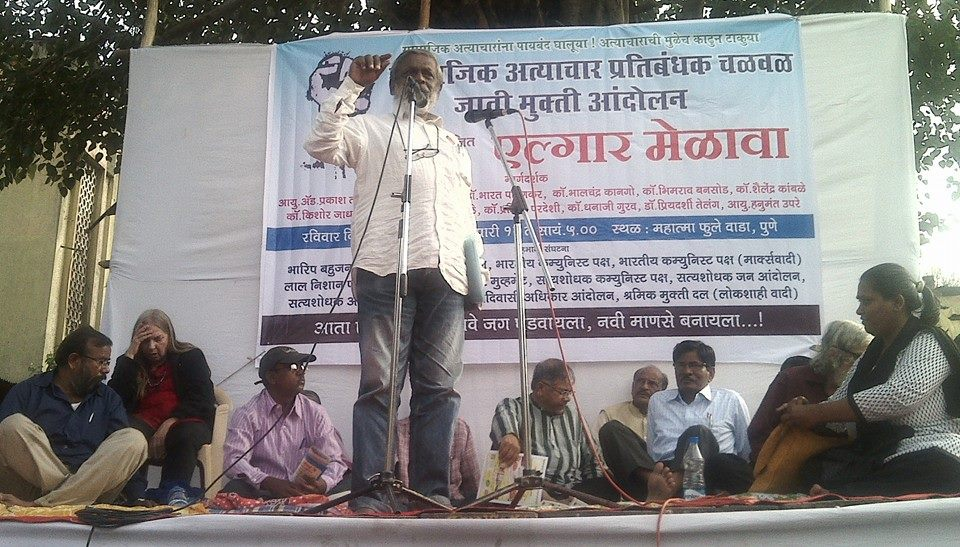
Patankar at Melawa

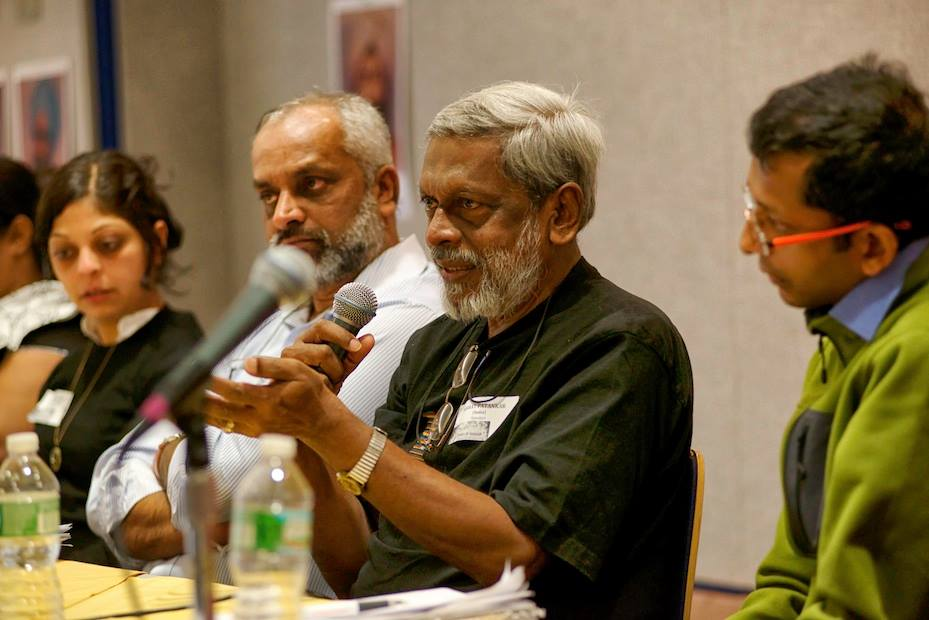
Patankar at Ghadar

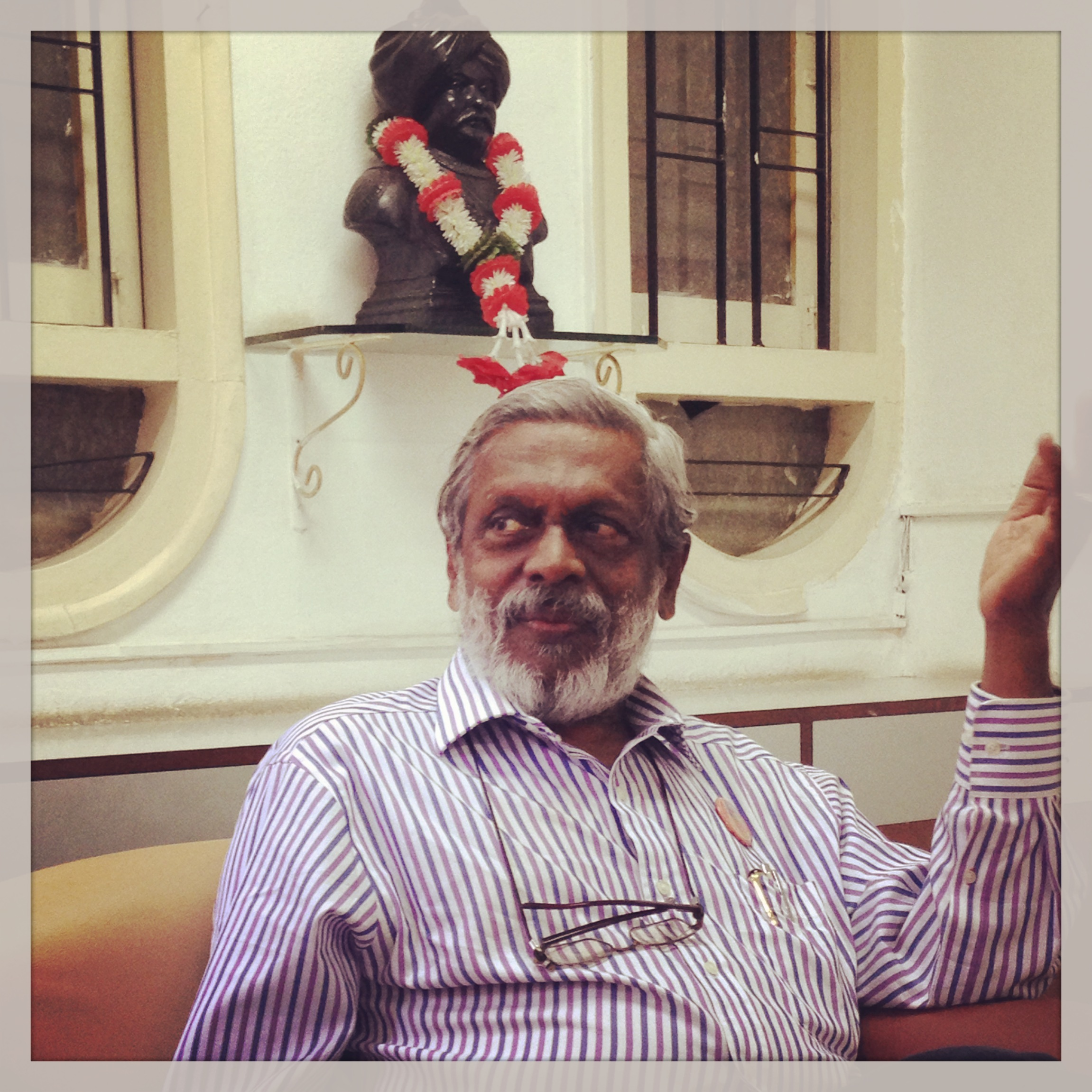
Patankar at Shahu Maharaj Auditorium, Kolhapur

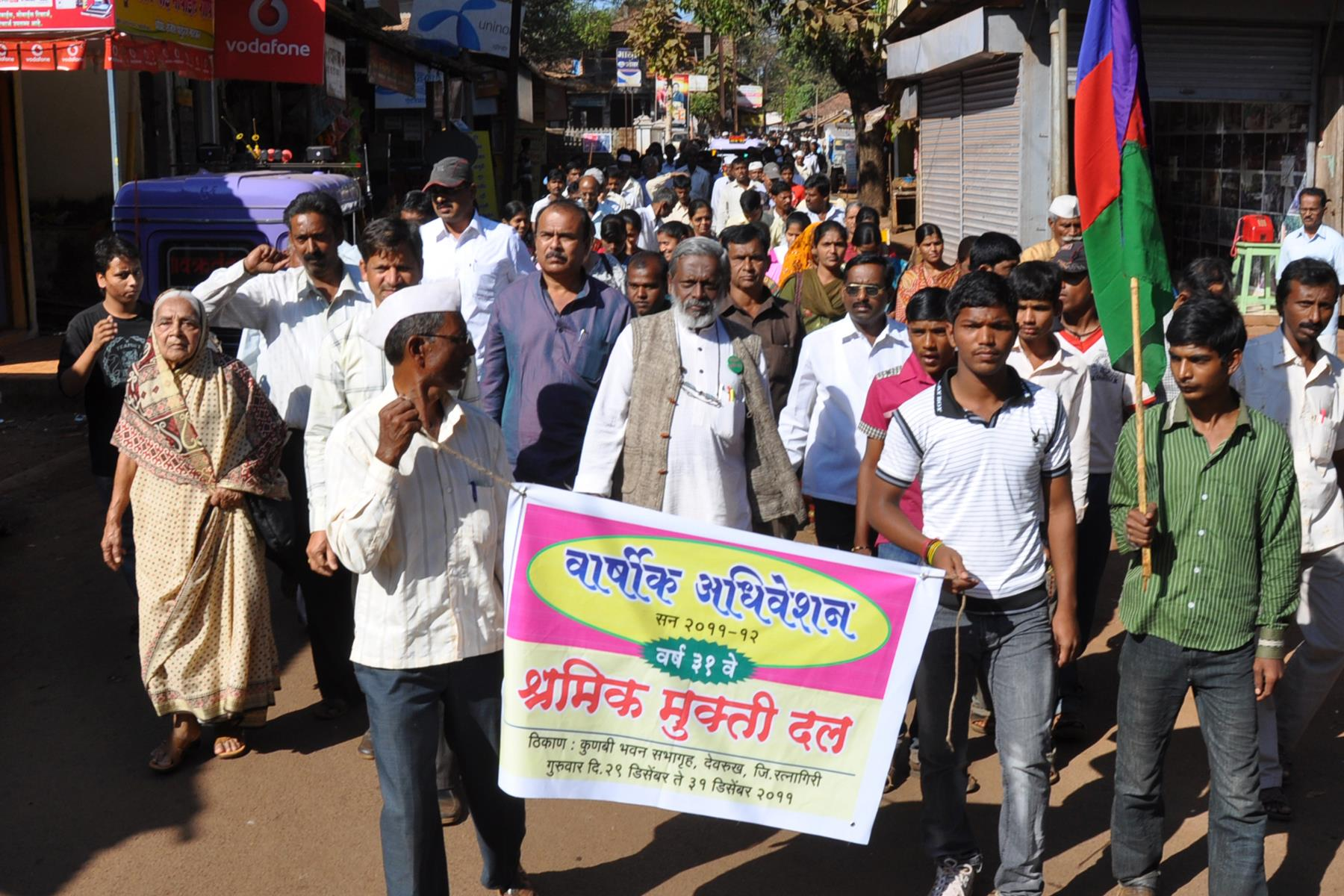
Patankar at SMD convention

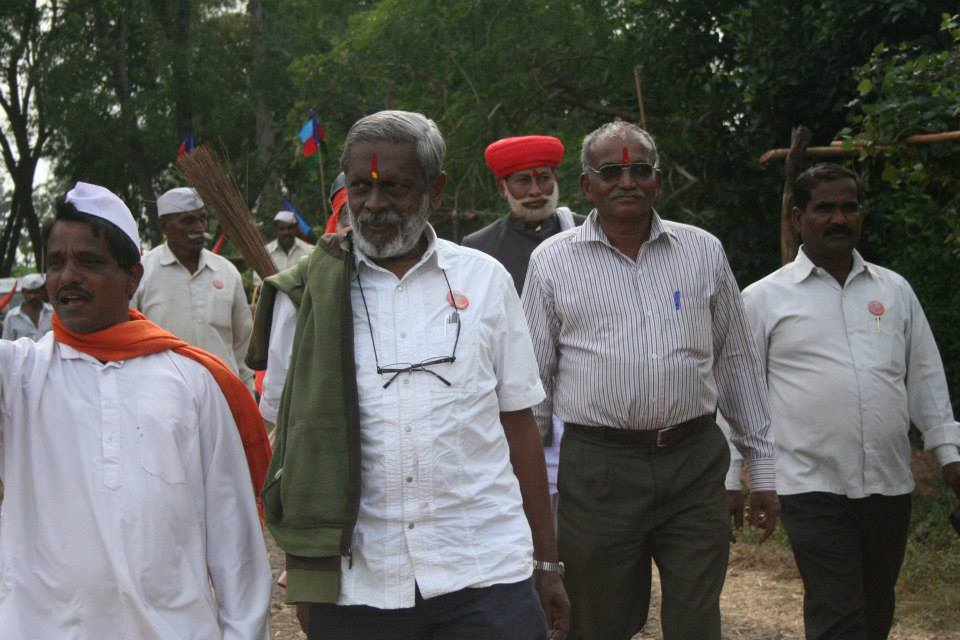
SMDadhiveshan

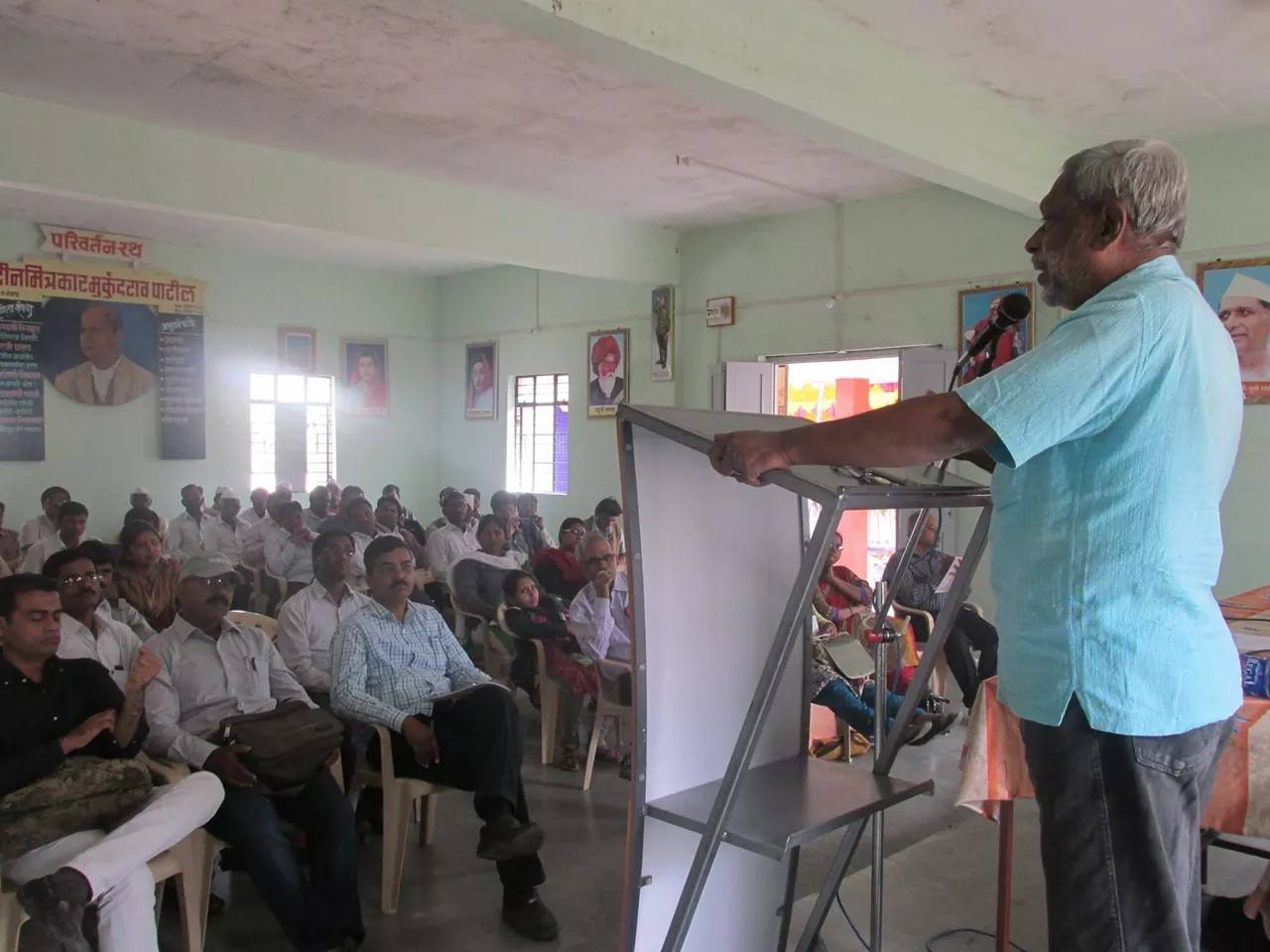
Patankar speaking

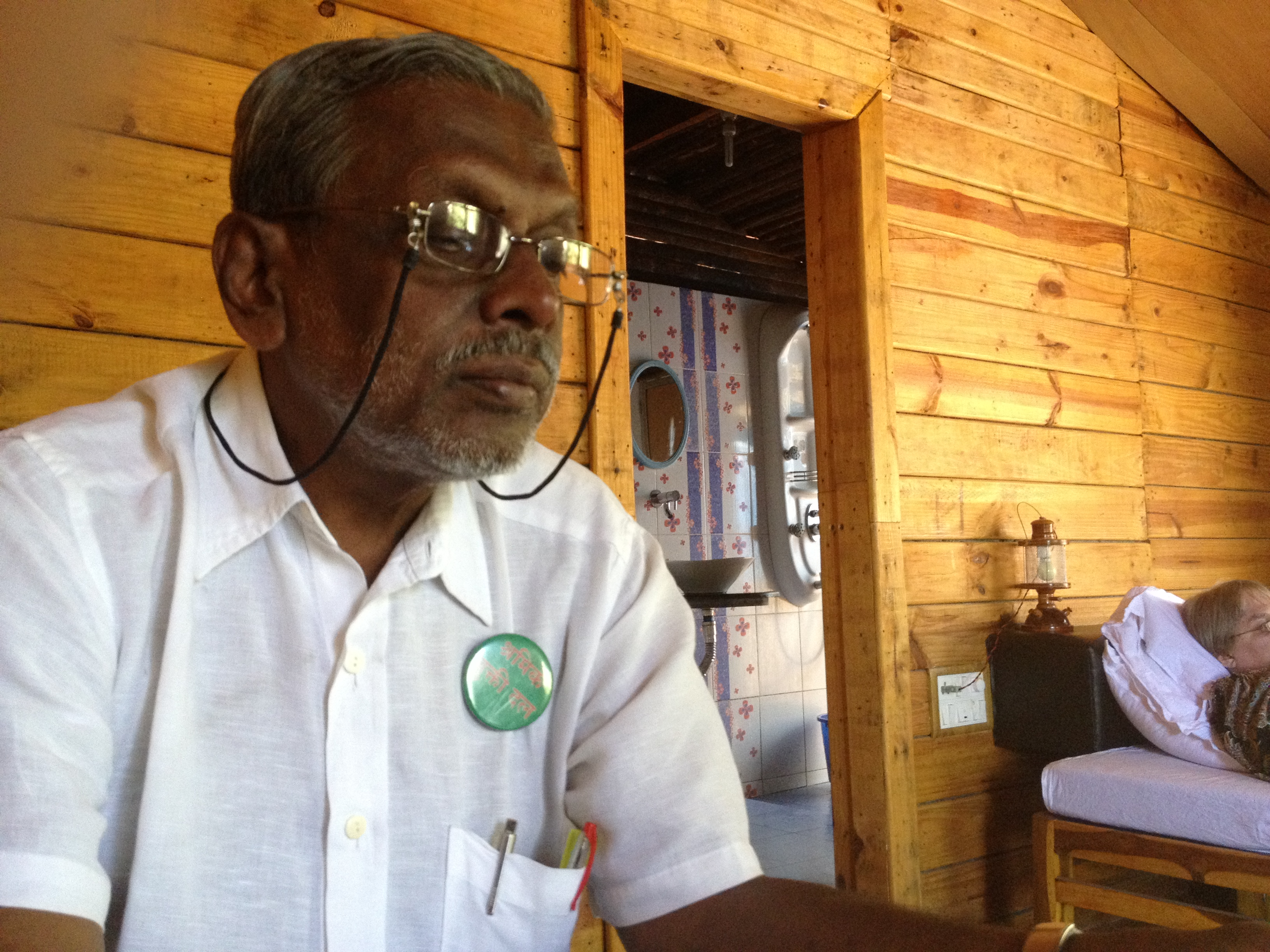
Patankar
