= Islampur–Patna Express =

Overview
- Service type: Express
- Current operator: East Central Railways

Route
- Termini: Islampur (IPR); Patna Junction (PNBE)
- Stops: 18
- Distance travelled: 65 km (40 mi)
- Average journey time: 2 hours
- Service frequency: Daily (Note: Runs seven-day in a week for every direction.)
- Train number: 18696 / 18695

On-board services
- Classes: AC 2 tier, AC 3 tier, Sleeper class, General Unreserved
- Seating arrangements: Yes
- Sleeping arrangements: No
- Catering facilities: On-board catering, E-catering
- Baggage facilities: No
- Other facilities: Below the seats

Technical
- Rolling stock: ICF coach
- Track gauge: 1,676 mm (5 ft 6 in)
- Operating speed: 32 km/h (20 mph), including halts

The Islampur–Patna Express is an Express train belonging to East Coast Railway zone that runs between Islampur and Patna Junction in India. It is currently being operated with 18696/18695 train numbers on a daily basis.

== Service ==
The 18695/Islampur–Patna Express has an average speed of 32 km/h and covers 65 km in 2h. The 18696/Patna–Islampur Express has an average speed of 26 km/h and covers 65 km in 2h 30 m.

== Route and halts ==
The important halts of the train are:

- Islampur
- Ekangarsarai
- Hilsa
- Daniyawan Bazar Halt
- Fatuha Junction
- Patna Sahib
- Patna Junction

== Coach composition ==
The train has standard ICF rakes with a max speed of 110 km/h. The train consists of 21 coaches:

- 1 First AC
- 1 AC II Tier
- 2 AC III Tier
- 9 Sleeper Coaches
- 5 General Unreserved
- 2 Seating cum Luggage Rake

== Traction ==
Both trains are hauled by a Mughalsarai-based WAP-4 electric locomotive from Patna to Islampur & vice versa.

== Rake sharing ==
The train shares its rake with 18621/18622 Patna–Hatia Express.

== See also ==
- Patna Junction railway station
- Islampur railway station
- Patna–Hatia Express
