= Islampur–Hatia Express =

Train in India

Overview
- Service type: Express
- Locale: Bihar & Jharkhand
- Current operator(s): South Eastern Railway

Route
- Termini: Islampur (IPR); Hatia (HTE)
- Stops: 25
- Distance travelled: 476 km (296 mi)
- Average journey time: 13 hrs 55 mins
- Service frequency: Daily
- Train number(s): 18623 / 18624

On-board services
- Class(es): AC First Class, AC 2 Tier, AC 3 Tier, Sleeper Class, General Unreserved
- Seating arrangements: Yes
- Sleeping arrangements: Yes
- Catering facilities: On-board catering, E-catering
- Observation facilities: Large windows
- Baggage facilities: No
- Other facilities: Below the seats

Technical
- Rolling stock: LHB coach
- Track gauge: 1,676 mm (5 ft 6 in)
- Operating speed: 38 km/h (24 mph), including halts

The 18623 / 18624 Islampur–Hatia Express is an express train belonging to South Eastern Railway zone that runs between Islampur and Hatia in India. It is currently being operated with 18623/18624 train numbers on a daily basis.

== Service ==
The 18623/Islampur–Hatia Express has an average speed of 36 km/h (22 mph) and covers 476 km (296 mi) in 12hr 55min. The 18624/Hatia–Islampur Express has an average speed of 34 km/h (21 mph) and covers 476 km (296 mi) in 13hr 55min.

== Route & Halts ==
The All halts of the train are:-

- Islampur
- Ekangarsarai
- Hilsa
- Daniyawan Bzr H
- Fatuha
- Patna Saheb
- RajendraNagar Terminal
- Patna Junction
- Nadwan
- Taregna
- Nadaul
- Jehanabad
- Makhdumpur Gaya
- Gaya Junction
- Paharpur
- Gujhandi
- Koderma Junction
- Hazaribagh Road
- Parashnath
- Netaji Subhas Chandra Bose Gomoh
- Chandrapura Junction
- Bokaro Steel City
- Muri Junction
- Tatisilwai
- Namkom
- Ranchi Junction
- Hatia

== Coach composition ==
The train has standard LHB rakes with a max speed of 130 km/h (81 mph). The train consists of 22 coaches :

- 1 First AC
- 2 AC II Tier
- 7 AC III Tier
- 1 AC lll Economy
- 7 Sleeper Coaches
- 2 General Unreserved
- 1 Seating cum Luggage Rake
- 1 EOG (End of Generator)

== Traction ==
Both trains are hauled by a Samastipur Loco Shed or Gomoh Loco Shed-based WAP-7 electric locomotive from Hatia to Islampur.

== Rake sharing ==
The train shares its rake with 20801/20802 Magadh Express.

== Direction reversal ==
The train reverses its direction 1 times:

- Gaya Junction

== See also ==
- Patna Junction railway station
- Hatia railway station
- Patna–Haita Patliputra Express
- Patna–Hatia Super Express
- Islampur–Patna Express
