= Dariyapur =

Dariyapur may refer to:

- Dariyapur, Bhopal, a village in Madhya Pradesh, India
- Dariyapur, Nalanda, a village in Bihar, India
- Dariapur (Ahmedabad), a locality in walled Ahmedabad, Gujarat, India
