= Gokulnagar railway station =

Railway station in Bihar, India

General information
- Location: Gokulnagar, Patna, Bihar; India
- Coordinates: 25.4739°N 85.2978°E
- Elevation: 52 metres (171 ft)
- System: Indian Railways station
- Owner: Indian Railways
- Operator: East Central Railway
- Platforms: 1
- Tracks: 4
- Connections: Auto stand

Construction
- Structure type: Standard (on-ground station)
- Parking: No
- Cycle facilities: No

Other information
- Status: Functioning
- Station code: XGN
- Zone(s): East Central Railway
- Division(s): Danapur

Services
Preceding station	Indian Railways	Following station
Fatuha Junction towards ?	East Central Railway zone Fatuha–Tilaiya line	Machriawan towards ?
Location

Gokulnagar railway station (station code: XGN), is a railway station in Patna district in the Indian state of Bihar. It serves Patna city. The station consists of 1 platform.
