= Barabigha =

- Country: India
- State: Bihar
- Founder: Shree Bulak Mahto
- Named for: Named on Baradih

Government
  - Type: State Govt.

Languages
  - Official: Hindi, Magahi, English
- Time zone: UTC+5:30 (IST)
- PIN: 801302
- Telephone code: +91-6111
- ISO 3166 code: IN-BR-PA
- Website: bih.nic.in

Barabigha is a small village in Nalanda district of Bihar. It is situated about 10 km north-east of Hilsa. Lohanda-Ramghat state highway connects this village by road. The nearest railway stations are Lohanda and Hilsa. Its post office is at Bhobhi. The nearby villages include Bhobhi, Sakrorha, Raghunathpur, Bhurkur, Dariyapur etc. Barabigha comes under Hilsa block. Hilsa is one of the four sub-divisions of Nalanda district of Bihar. Most of the residents of the village are farmers.

== Introduction ==
Barabigha is one of the underdeveloped village in Nalanda district. Cultivation, Business and Service are main employment source of the youth of this village. The main crops of this village is paddy, wheat and some rabi crops also. Many of the youngsters of this village is on great post on their respective fields. This village falls in the Hilsa sub-division. Bhobhi is the police station and the local post office is Bhobhi . This village is fall into the Nadaha panchayat. Although, the residents of Barbigha belongs to many casts, a large number of people are Kurmi(Mahto). Although the residents of this village are quite familiar with language "HINDI", but majority of them prefer to speak the local language "MAGAHI".

== Development ==
This village is among the less developed areas in the Nalanda district of Bihar. It lacks adequate electricity and transportation services. However, there is good outdoor coverage of Airtel, Vodafone and Reliance for mobile communication.

== Education ==
There are one middle schools and a no high school in Barabigha.

== Summary ==
- Cast: Kurmi(in majority) and other casts.
- Crops: Paddy, Wheat, Potato, Onion, Maize etc.
- Location: Latitude: 25°20'46.49" N Longitude: 85°19'39.15" E
