= Naika Road railway station =

Railway station in Bihar, India

General information
- Location: State Highway 4, Patna district, Bihar; India
- Coordinates: 25.44858°N 85.292377°E
- Elevation: 52 metres (171 ft)
- System: Indian Railways station
- Owner: Indian Railways
- Operator: East Central Railway
- Line: Fatuha–Tilaiya line
- Platforms: 1
- Tracks: Single Electric line

Construction
- Structure type: Standard (on-ground station)
- Parking: No

Other information
- Status: Functioning
- Station code: NARD
- Zone(s): East Central Railway
- Division(s): Danapur

Services
Preceding station	Indian Railways	Following station
Machriawan towards ?	East Central Railway zone Fatuha–Tilaiya line	Daniyawan Bazar towards ?
Location

Naika Road railway station is a halt railway station located on Fatuha–Tilaiya railway line operated by East Central Railway zone under Danapur railway division. It is situated beside State Highway 4 in Patna district in the Indian state of Bihar.
