= Orro =

Village in Bihar, India

Orro is a village in the Nardiganj block of the Nawada district in the Indian state of Bihar. The total population of the village is approximately 10,000. Orro is 20 km from the famous pilgrimage town of Rajgir.

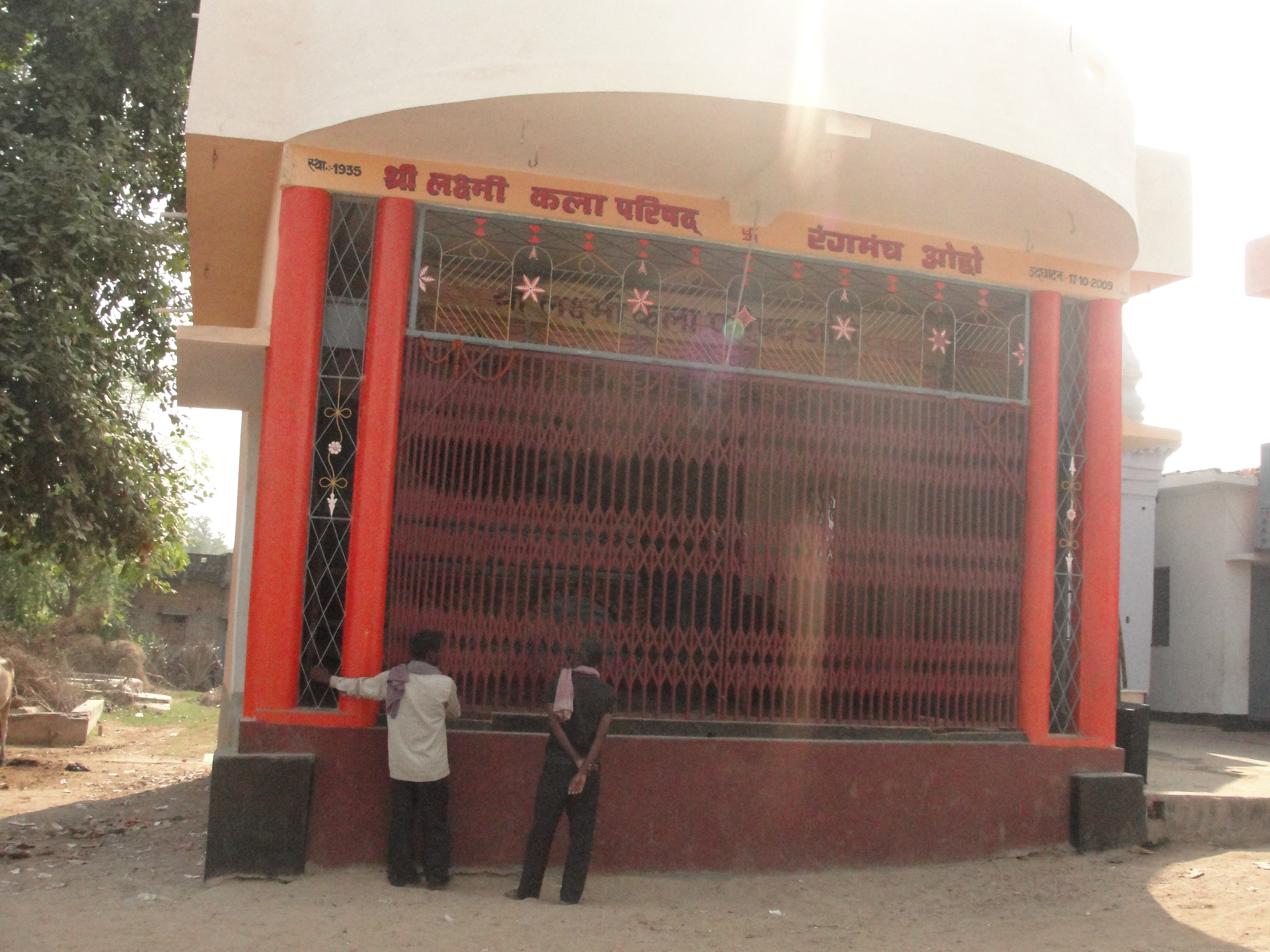
Lakshmi Mandir

== Education ==
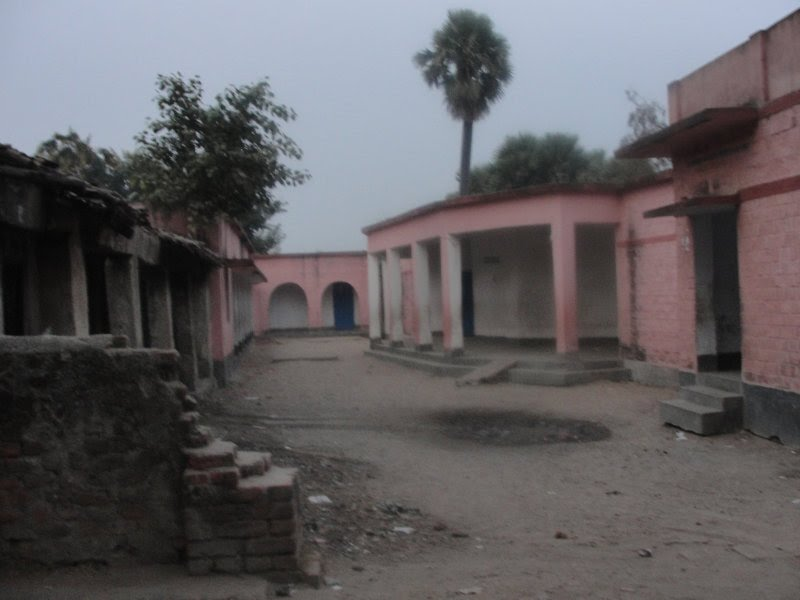
Middle School

In Orro there are various schools such as a primary, middle and a high school. Orro high school, (Now +2, From 2010) is the only high school for neighbouring villages. Orro has been known for its rich educational background for producing great scholars like Pandit Prasidh Narayan Mishra and Pandit Singheswara Mishra.

== Transport ==
The Oro Jagadishpur railway station is situated on Bakhtiyarpur–Tilaiya line under Danapur railway division. It connects Rajgir and Hisua railway station.

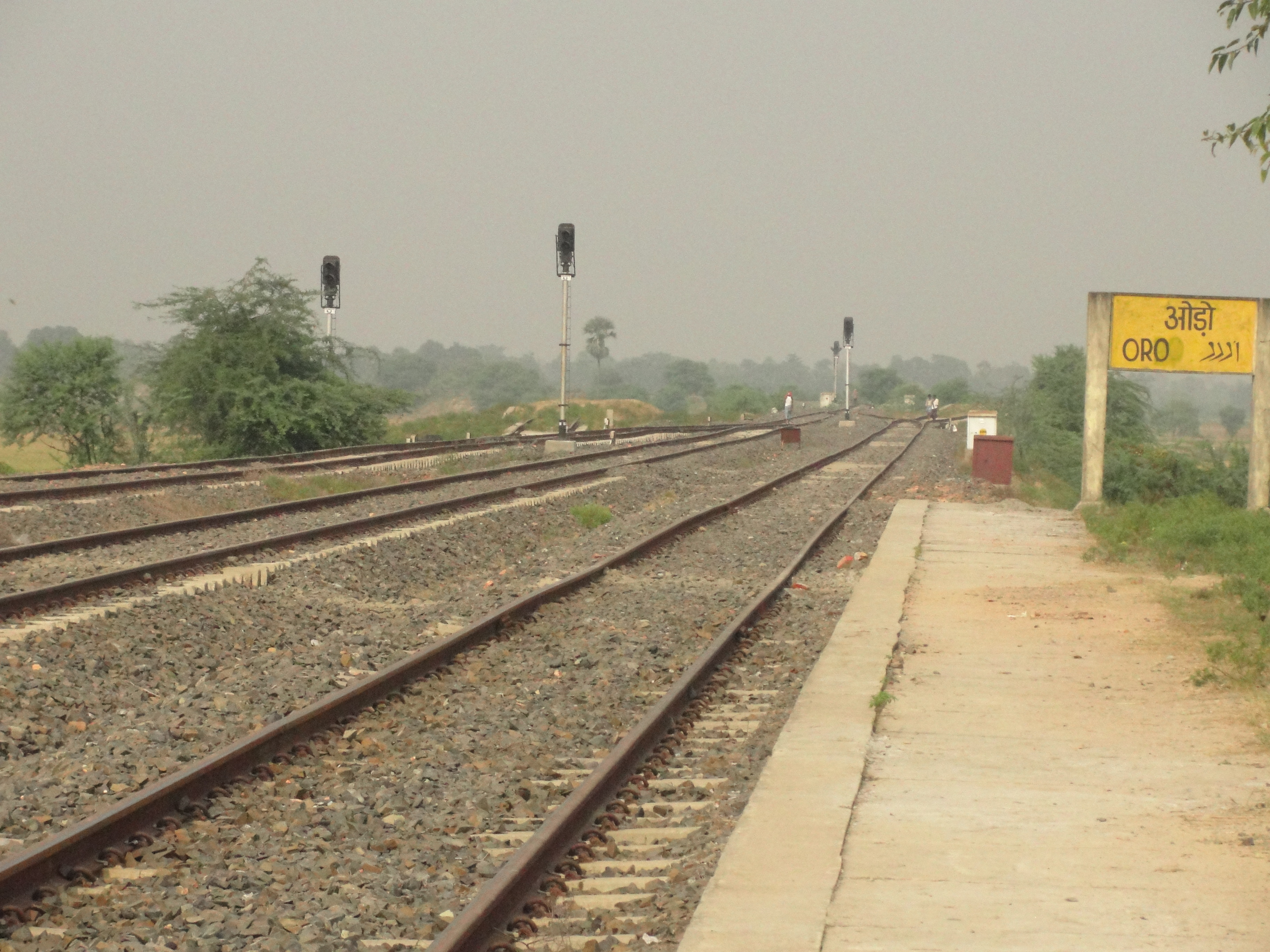
Orro Railway Station

== Festivals ==
Main festival of Orro village is Lakshmi Pooja, Sarasawati Pooja, Ganesh Pooja. A Lakhsmi Mandir was established in 1935 by Shri Madhusudan Mishra, a social worker and medical practitioner of the village.

- Lakshmi Puja
- Saraswati Puja
- Ganesh Puja
- Chhath
- Durga Puja
