= Lohanda railway station =

Railway station in Bihar, India

General information
- Location: State Highway 4, Lohanda, Pachrukhiya, Nalanda district, Bihar; India
- Coordinates: 25.354115°N 85.279024°E
- Elevation: 56 metres (184 ft)
- System: Indian Railways station
- Owner: Indian Railways
- Operator: East Central Railway
- Line: Fatuha–Tilaiya line
- Platforms: 1
- Tracks: Single Electric line

Construction
- Structure type: Standard (on-ground station)

Other information
- Status: Functioning
- Station code: LHNA
- Zone(s): East Central Railway
- Division(s): Danapur

Services
| Preceding station | Indian Railways | Following station |
|---|---|---|
| Singriyawan towards ? | East Central Railway zone Fatuha–Tilaiya line | Kamta towards ? |
Location

Lohanda railway station (station code: LHNA), is a railway station located on Fatuha–Tilaiya railway line operated by East Central Railway zone under Danapur railway division. It is situated beside State Highway 4 at Lohanda, Pachrukhiya in Nalanda district in the Indian state of Bihar.
