= Chiksaura =

- Village
- Location in Bihar, India
- Coordinates: 25.3306°N 85.2131°E
- Country: India
- State: Bihar

Area
  - Total: 4.17 km^{2} (1.61 sq mi)

Languages
  - Official: Magahi, Hindi
- Time zone: UTC+5:30 (IST)
- ISO 3166 code: IN-BR

Chiksaura is a small market village in Hilsa, Nalanda District, in Bihar State in India.

It is situated about 10 kilometres (6.2 mi) west of Hilsa city, and is connected to Hilsa by a good road. The village is located in the Hilsa Community Development Block. The village has a police station.
