= Gulni Madhopur =

- village
- Location in Bihar, India Gulni Madhopur (India)
- Coordinates: 25.32°N 85.28°E
- Country: India
- State: Bihar
- District: Nalanda

Area
  - Total: 8 km^{2} (3.1 sq mi)
- Elevation: 44 m (144 ft)

Population (2001)
  - Total: 3,001
  - Density: 250/km^{2} (650/sq mi)

Languages
  - Official: Magadhi, Hindi
- Time zone: UTC+5:30 (IST)
- PIN: 801302
- Telephone code: 91 6111
- Sex ratio: 1.017 ♂/♀
- Literacy: 60.00%%
- Lok Sabha constituency: Nalanda
- Vidhan Sabha constituency: Hilsa
- Website: www.gulni.org
- "We seek peace, knowing that peace is the climate of freedom."

Gulni (officially Madhopur Sakin Gulni) is a village in Bihar, India. It is surrounded by rivers from the south and the north, and is four kilometers south of Hilsa, Bihar. It primarily produces rice, wheat, potatoes, and livestock totaling approximately $1 million every year.

== History ==
People started inhabiting the area close to the 1840s. The oldest known residents are Tufani Yadav and Anant Mahto, the offspring of whom form almost one-quarter of the current village population. The village is also known as Madhopur Sakin Gulni.

Tej Bahadur Singh (popularly known as Singhji) was one of the prominent freedom fighters from Gulni. He was a member of the Indian National Congress and led the mass mobilization against foreign rule. He was active since 1931 and, after independence, continued his work to synergize the attitudes of the police and local administration, and instill self-confidence, reliance, and respect among people.

After independence, the village experienced a significant growth in crop production and came into the mainstream of the government system. The number of engineers, doctors, educators, entrepreneurs, and other professions has increased since independence in 1947, which led to rapid growth in art and culture related activities.

Sanjay Guruji introduced the village cultural program in the 1990s, which usually takes place on every Basant Panchami.

In 1963 a tube well was installed to irrigate barren lands, which helped the people cultivate more than two crops in a year, and increased the surplus production of crops.

== Centres of learning ==
The village has primary and pre-secondary education centers. Primary School Gulni is located at the front of the village, though due to a lack of modern infrastructure, not many people send their children to this school; most children are sent to Middle School Gulni Haiderpur, which is slightly more equipped.

High School Yogipur Gosainpur has been the main secondary school of this village for years. Most engineers, doctors, managers, and entrepreneurs have attended this school till 10th standard grade level. Rambabu High School of Hilsa also provides secondary education.

== Political structure ==
Until recent elections, Gulni was a gram panchayat (the smallest democratic unit in the Indian political system). The panchayat is headed by a mukhiya, who spearheads the village council of members.

== Language ==
Magahi is the native language, though Hindi is the designated official language for business and governmental communication. English is taught as a second language for business communication.

== Religious places ==
Gulni Thakurwari is the main religious temple of this village. The Thakurwari is a host of numerous old age statues of several Hindu gods and goddesses.

Mahadeva Sthana was established by Shree Ramswaroop Yadav. During the month of Sravana devotees come to worship with immense faith.

Devi and Kali Sthana is a religious temple located at the front of the village.

== Economy ==
Gulni Madhopur's economy is mostly composed of the service, crop agriculture, and brick production industries. About 10% of the total population is engaged in the service sector, which contributes to over 80% of the revenue.

A large number of people have migrated to different parts of India and the Americas in search of sustainable access to development opportunities.

== People ==
The population of this village is approximately 2,000 (including those who have migrated, as they own land and infrastructure). Of the 60% literate population, only 20% are female. Several projects have been launched, including the Prime Minister Rural Literacy Programme to increase literacy among people.

Most of the educated population is engaged in either government services or working with major national or international corporations. The education sector is one of the biggest employers after agriculture.
