= Daniyawan Bazar railway station =

Railway station in Bihar

General information
- Location: Dhaniyawan bazar, Patna district, Bihar; India
- Coordinates: 25.434504°N 85.290895°E
- Elevation: 33 metres (108 ft)
- System: Indian Railways station
- Owner: Indian Railways
- Operator: East Central Railway
- Line: Fatuha–Tilaiya line
- Platforms: 1
- Tracks: Single Electric line

Construction
- Structure type: Standard (on-ground station)
- Parking: No

Other information
- Status: Functioning
- Station code: DNWH
- Zone(s): East Central Railway
- Division(s): Danapur

Services
Preceding station	Indian Railways	Following station
Naika Road towards ?	East Central Railway zone Fatuha–Tilaiya line	Dhaniyawan Junction towards ?
Location

Daniyawan Bazar railway station is a halt railway station located on Fatuha–Tilaiya railway line operated by East Central Railway zone under Danapur railway division. It is situated at Dhaniyawan bazar in Patna district in the Indian state of Bihar.
