= Machriawan railway station =

Railway station in Bihar, India

General information
- Location: State Highway 4, Machhariyawan, Daniyawan Block, Patna district, Bihar; India
- Coordinates: 25.46248°N 85.29442°E
- Elevation: 55 metres (180 ft)
- System: Indian Railways station
- Owner: Indian Railways
- Operator: East Central Railway
- Line: Fatuha–Tilaiya line
- Platforms: 1

Construction
- Structure type: Standard (on-ground station)
- Parking: No
- Cycle facilities: No

Other information
- Status: Functioning
- Station code: MCY
- Zone(s): East Central Railway
- Division(s): Danapur

Services
| Preceding station | Indian Railways | Following station |
|---|---|---|
| Gokulnagar towards ? | East Central Railway zone Fatuha–Tilaiya line | Naika Road towards ? |
Location

Machriawan railway station is a railway station located on Fatuha–Tilaiya railway line operated by East Central Railway zone under Danapur railway division. It is situated beside State Highway 4 at Machhariyawan, Daniyawan Blockat in Patna district in the Indian state of Bihar.
