= Magadh Express =

Train in India

- Magadh Express standing at New Delhi.

Overview
- Service type: Superfast
- Locale: Bihar, Uttar Pradesh & Delhi
- First service: 2 September 1980; 46 years ago
- Current operator: South Eastern Railway

Route
- Termini: Islampur (IPR); New Delhi (NDLS)
- Stops: 27
- Distance travelled: 1,063 km (661 mi)
- Average journey time: 19 hours 25 minutes
- Service frequency: Daily
- Train number: 20801 / 20802

On-board services
- Classes: AC First Class, AC 2 Tier, AC 3 Tier, Sleeper Class, General Unreserved
- Seating arrangements: Yes
- Sleeping arrangements: Yes
- Catering facilities: On-board catering, E-Catering
- Observation facilities: Large windows
- Baggage facilities: Available
- Other facilities: Below the seats

Technical
- Rolling stock: LHB coach
- Track gauge: 1,676 mm (5 ft 6 in); Broad Gauge
- Operating speed: 54 km/h (34 mph) average with halts
Route map
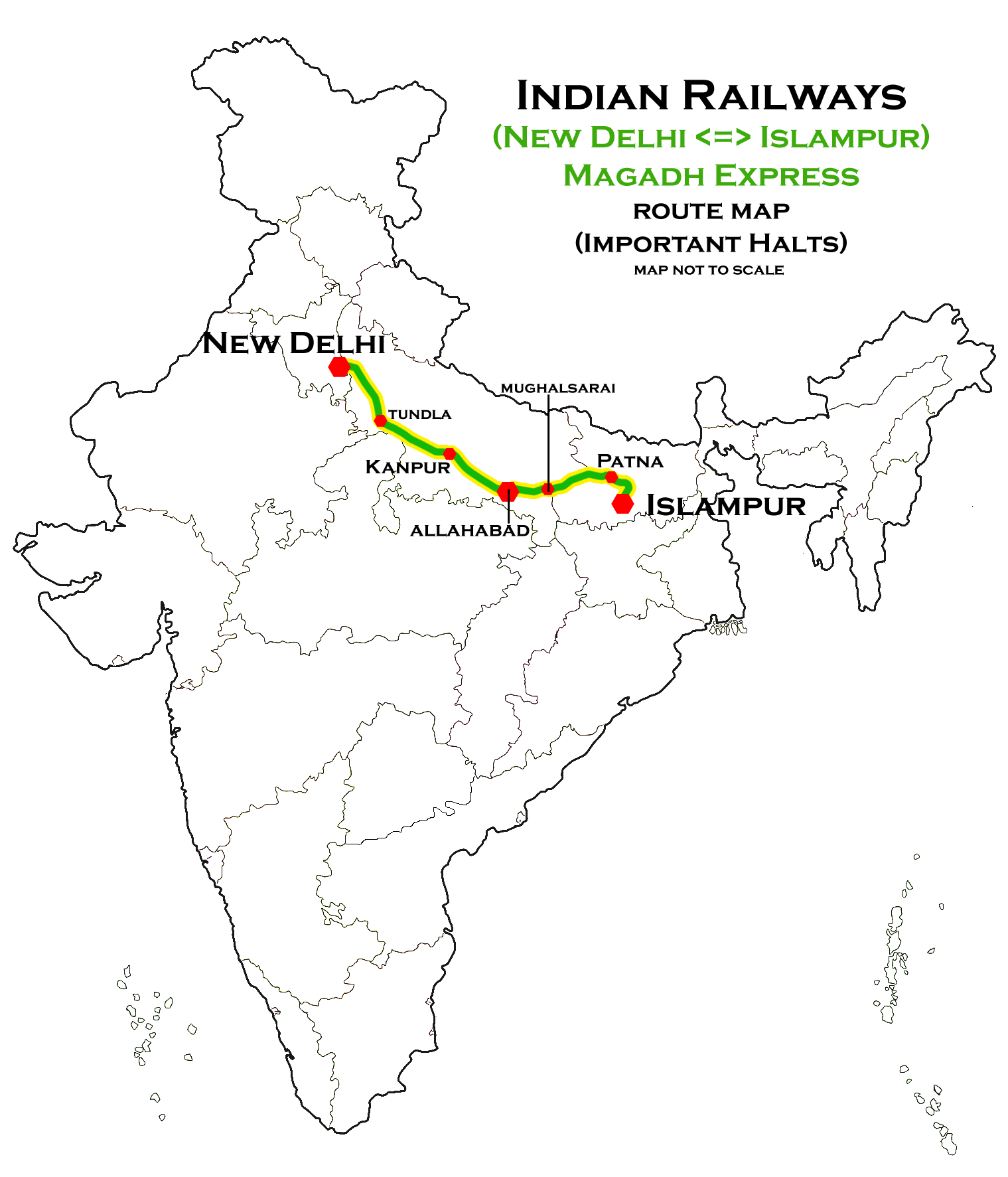

The 20801 / 20802 Magadh Express is a superfast train running between New Delhi and Islampur. Previously numbered 2401/2402, it was operated under the Northern Railway zone. It is currently listed under the South Eastern Railway zone.

== History ==
The Magadh Express was once one of the premier trains connecting Patna with New Delhi. During the 1990s, it was regarded as one of the fastest and most reliable trains on this route, when services such as the Sampoorna Kranti Express and Rajdhani Express had not yet been introduced. Initially, the train was linked to the Bhagalpur-bound Vikramshila Express, with a portion of the rake detached at Patna Junction for the onward journey to Bhagalpur. In June 2003, the Danapur division of East Central Railway announced that the Magadh Express (2391/2392) would operate independently from Patna Junction from 1 July 2003. Its composition was increased from 14 to 18 coaches, and a pantry car was also provided.

In the early 2000s, the train was extended to Islampur in Bihar's Nalanda district, replacing Patna as its Bihar terminus. The extension increased its reach to passengers in the Nalanda region. Over the years, the train underwent changes in its numbering, coach composition and operations while continuing to connect Bihar with the national capital.

== Schedule ==
- 20801 MAGADH EXPRESS departs Islampur every day at 15:30 IST (03:30 PM) and reaches New Delhi the next day at 12:00 IST (12:00 PM). It takes 20 hours 30 minutes.
- 20802 MAGADH EXPRESS departs New Delhi every day at 21:05 IST (09:05 PM) and reaches Islampur the next day at 15:25 IST (03:25 PM). It takes 18 hours 20 minutes.

== Route and halts ==
- Islampur
- Fatuha Junction
- Patna Sahib
- Rajendra Nagar Terminal
- Patna Junction
- Phulwari Sharif
- Danapur
- Bihta
- Ara Junction
- Buxar
- Dildarnagar Junction
- Zamania
- Pt. Deen Dayal Upadhyaya Junction
- Mirzapur
- Vindhyachal
- Prayagraj Junction
- Kanpur Central
- Etawah Junction
- Firozabad
- Tundla Junction
- Aligarh Junction
- New Delhi.

== Traction ==
The Magadh Express is hauled by a WAP-7 electric locomotive, usually based at Gomoh Loco Shed.

== Rake sharing ==
The train shares its rake with the 18623/18624 Islampur–Hatia Express.

== Coaches ==
The Magadh Express has a 22-coach LHB rake. Its earlier composition consisted of 1 End-on Generation (EOG) car, 1 First AC coach (H1), 2 AC Two Tier coaches (A1), 7 AC Three Tier coaches (B1 to B7), 1 AC Three Tier Economy coach (M1), 7 Sleeper coaches (S1 to S7), 2 unreserved coaches and 1 Seating-cum-Luggage Rake (SLR).

With effect from 1 April 2025 for train 20801 departing Islampur and 2 April 2025 for train 20802 departing New Delhi, the composition was revised to 1 First AC coach (H1), 2 AC Two Tier coaches (A1), 5 AC Three Tier coaches (B1 to B5), 1 AC Three Tier Economy coach (M1), 7 Sleeper coaches (S1 to S7), 4 unreserved coaches, 1 End-on Generation (EOG) car and 1 Seating-cum-Luggage Rake (SLR).

== Accident ==
On 2 January 2010, in an accident caused by dense fog, the Lichchavi Express collided with the stationary Magadh Express between Sarai Bhopat and Etawah railway stations in Uttar Pradesh. Several people, including the driver of the Lichchavi Express, were injured.

On 15 January 2018, the locomotive of the Magadh Express caught fire between Twining Ganj and Raghunathpur stations on the Mughalsarai–Patna section of Danapur Division. Railway officials reported no injuries among passengers. The loco pilot noticed the fire and promptly controlled it using an onboard fire extinguisher, preventing injuries to passengers. His quick response was praised by railway officials.
