= Kamta railway station =

Railway station in Bihar

General information
- Location: State Highway 4, Kamta, Nalanda district, Bihar; India
- Coordinates: 25.336744°N 85.277916°E
- Elevation: 55 metres (180 ft)
- System: Indian Railways station
- Owner: Indian Railways
- Operator: East Central Railway
- Line: Fatuha–Tilaiya line
- Platforms: 1
- Tracks: Single Electric line

Construction
- Structure type: Standard (on-ground station)

Other information
- Status: Functioning
- Station code: KAMA
- Zone(s): East Central Railway
- Division(s): Danapur

Services
| Preceding station | Indian Railways | Following station |
|---|---|---|
| Lohanda towards ? | East Central Railway zone Fatuha–Tilaiya line | Hilsa towards ? |
Location

Kamta railway station is a halt railway station located on Fatuha–Tilaiya railway line operated by East Central Railway zone under Danapur railway division. It is situated beside State Highway 4 at Kamta in Nalanda district in the Indian state of Bihar.
