= Rambhawan railway station =

Railway station in Bihar, India

General information
- Location: State Highway 4, Rambhawan, Chaklodipur, Nalanda district, Bihar; India
- Coordinates: 25.254748°N 85.239275°E
- Elevation: 62 metres (203 ft)
- System: Indian Railways station
- Owner: Indian Railways
- Operator: East Central Railway
- Line: Fatuha–Tilaiya line
- Platforms: 1
- Tracks: Single Electric line

Construction
- Structure type: Standard (on-ground station)

Other information
- Status: Functioning
- Station code: RPWN
- Zone(s): East Central Railway
- Division(s): Danapur

Services
Preceding station	Indian Railways	Following station
Junair Halt towards ?	East Central Railway zone Fatuha–Tilaiya line	Ekangarsarai towards ?
Location

Rambhawan railway station is a railway station located on Fatuha–Tilaiya railway line operated by East Central Railway zone under Danapur railway division. It is situated beside State Highway 4 at Rambhawan, Chaklodipur in Nalanda district in the Indian state of Bihar.
