= Oro Jagadishpur railway station =

Railway station in Bihar

Oro Jagadishpur

General information
- Location: Orro, Nawada district, Bihar; India
- Coordinates: 24°54′14″N 85°24′50″E
- Elevation: 85 m (279 ft)
- System: Passenger train station
- Owner: Indian Railways
- Operator: East Central Railway zone
- Line: Bakhtiyarpur–Tilaiya line
- Platforms: 2
- Tracks: 1

Construction
- Structure type: Standard (on ground station)

Other information
- Status: Active
- Station code: JDPR
- Zone(s): East Central Railway zone
- Division(s): Danapur

Services
Preceding station	Indian Railways	Following station
Sarsoo towards ?	East Central Railway zone Bakhtiyarpur–Tilaiya line	Mohamadpur towards ?
Location

Jagadishpur railway station is a railway station on the Bakhtiyarpur–Tilaiya line under the Danapur railway division of East Central Railway zone. It is situated at jagdishpur in Nawada district in the Indian state of Bihar.
