= Hisua =

- Town
- Location in Bihar, India Hisua (India)
- Coordinates: 24.83°N 85.42°E
- Country: India
- State: Bihar
- District: Nawada
- Elevation: 93 m (305 ft)

Population (2011)
  - Total: 32,585

Language
  - Official: Hindi
  - Additional official: Urdu
  - Other: Magahi
- Time zone: UTC+5:30 (IST)
- PIN: 805103

Hisua is a town and a municipality in Nawada district in the India state of Bihar. It is situated on the right bank of the Tilaiya river along Gaya and Nawada road, 9 miles (14 km) west of Nawada and 27 miles (43 km) east of Gaya. The city lies adjacent to the Tilaiya Junction railway station on the Southern Bihar Railway. The primary occupation of Hisua's residents is agriculture, and the town is known for its pottery and local poetry. Hisua is also known for gold jewellery shops. Tilkut, lai, anarsa and khaja are among the traditional sweets from Hisua that are popular in Bihar.

== History ==
Hisua had a system of tax collection called zamindari, which was prevalent until 1953. Most of the agricultural land and surroundings of Hisua were controlled by the zamindar family three brothers out of five ruled and controlled large acres of land in and around Gaya Bihar. Their haveli (private mansion) was known as Hisua Darbar in Hisua and Gaya. They had control over a large area spanning Chouparan, Sherghati, Gaya, Nawada, Rajgir, Hisua, Akbarpur and Rajouli. They had a large area of land for mica mining, which they eventually leased out to various companies. After the abolition of Zamindari Pratha by Vinoba Bhave in 1953, the agricultural land was distributed to the local villagers by the zamindar family of Hisua Estate.

== Demographics ==
In the mid-19th century, many labourers from the region migrated to Mauritius, Reunion Island, and various Caribbean islands. The population of Hisua was 6,704 in 1901, but had grown to 25,045 by 2001.

According of 2011 Indian Census, Hisua had a total population of 32,585, of which 16,987 were males and 15,598 were females. Population within the age group of 0 to 6 years was 5,504. The total number of literates in Hisua was 19,361, which constituted 59.4% of the population with male literacy of 64.8% and female literacy of 53.5%. The effective literacy rate of 7+ population of Hisua was 71.5%, of which male literacy rate was 78.0% and female literacy rate was 64.4%. The Scheduled Castes and Scheduled Tribes population was 6,178 and 9 respectively. Hisua had 5096 households in 2011.

Hisua was India's first child labour-free block.

== Languages ==
The official languages are Hindi and Urdu. Magahi is the most commonly spoken language in Hisua.

== Commerce ==
The main market of Hisua is at Bazaar, Main Road and Narhat Road. Hisua's economy is primarily dependent on agriculture. There are three petrol pump stations in Hisua town, automobile showrooms and one domestic gas agency in the city. The Station Road area is an emerging commercial hub with the development of a new railway line from Tilaiya to Koderma and Rajgir.

== Industry ==
Although most industries in Hisua are small-scale, family-owned businesses, Hisua is the second fastest-growing town in the district of Nawada. Planned developments include a pipeline project, a polytechnic college, and an extension of the railway from Tilaiya Station to Koderma.

== Education ==
- Gyan Bharti Model Residential Complex, a CBSE-affiliated school near Dhanwan, 3 km east of Hisua. The school was founded in 1995.
- Sharda Public School, Station Road Hasua.
- Chanakya Vidyapith, primary school near bagodar
- Jeevan Jyoti
- Khanqah Chishtia Madarsa, Chhota Shaikhpura
- Faran Academy, Khankhanapur, Hisua

== Railway station ==
Hisua railway station is the main station of Hisua. Nearby Tilaiya Junction railway station connects Gaya, Kiul, Nawada, Rajgir and Koderma.
