= Mohamadpur railway station =

Railway station in Bihar

Mohamadpur

General information
- Location: National Highway 82, Sonsa, Nawada district, Bihar; India
- Coordinates: 24°52′39″N 85°24′56″E
- Elevation: 90 m (300 ft)
- System: Passenger train station
- Owner: Indian Railways
- Operator: East Central Railway zone
- Line: Bakhtiyarpur–Tilaiya line
- Platforms: 1
- Tracks: 1

Construction
- Structure type: Standard (on ground station)

Other information
- Status: Active
- Station code: MMDP
- Zone(s): East Central Railway zone
- Division(s): Danapur

Services
Preceding station	Indian Railways	Following station
Oro Jagadishpur towards ?	East Central Railway zone Bakhtiyarpur–Tilaiya line	Hisua towards ?
Location

Mohamadpur railway station is a railway station on the Bakhtiyarpur–Tilaiya line under the Danapur railway division of East Central Railway zone. It is situated beside National Highway 82 at Sonsa in Nawada district in the Indian state of Bihar.
