= Islampur railway station =

Railway station in Bihar

ISLAMPUR
- Indian Railways logo

General information
- Location: State Highway 71, Islampur, Nalanda, Bihar; India
- Coordinates: 25.15°N 85.2°E
- Elevation: 63 metres (207 ft)
- System: Indian Railways
- Owner: Indian Railways
- Operator: East Central Railways
- Line: Fatuha–Tilaiya line
- Platforms: 3
- Tracks: 4

Construction
- Structure type: Standard (on-ground station)
- Parking: Yes
- Accessible: Available

Other information
- Status: Functioning
- Station code: IPR
- Zone(s): East Central Railway zone
- Division(s): Danapur
Location
- Location within Bihar Location within India

Islampur railway station (station code: IPR), is located in Islampur, Nalanda district, in the Indian state of Bihar. It comes under the East Central Railway zone of Danapur division.

== Trains ==
There are many trains from Islampur to other big cities. Islampur is connected directly to New Delhi by the Magadh Express. A new train, the Hatia–Rajendra Nagar–Islampur Intercity Express, is also running. Currently two express trains and two passenger trains, Patna–Islampur Passenger and Fatuha–Islampur Passenger (formerly Buxar–Islampur fast passenger) run on this track.

== Electrification ==
Feasibility studies for the electrification of the Manpur–Tilaiya–Kiul sector and Fatuha–Islampur–Bakhtiyarpur–Rajgir sectors were announced in the rail budget for 2010–11.

== Lines ==
The Fatuha–Tilaiya line is a railway line connecting Fatuha on the Howrah–Delhi main line and Tilaiya on the Gaya–Kiul line both in the Indian state of Bihar. The line was earlier known as Fatuha–Islampur line. A small portion of the line from Islampur to Natesar is still to be opened for use.

== See also ==
- Danapur
- Fatuha Junction
- Magadh Express
