= Sarsoo railway station =

Railway station in Bihar

Sarsoo

General information
- Location: Nardiganj, Sarsoo, Gaya district, Bihar; India
- Coordinates: 24°55′11″N 85°21′13″E
- Elevation: 88 m (289 ft)
- System: Passenger train station
- Owner: Indian Railways
- Operator: East Central Railway zone
- Line: Bakhtiyarpur–Tilaiya line
- Platforms: 1
- Tracks: 1

Construction
- Structure type: Standard (on ground station)

Other information
- Status: Active
- Station code: SRSO
- Zone(s): East Central Railway zone
- Division(s): Danapur

Services
Preceding station	Indian Railways	Following station
Jethian towards ?	East Central Railway zone Bakhtiyarpur–Tilaiya line	Oro Jagadishpur towards ?
Location

Sarsoo railway station is a railway station on the Bakhtiyarpur–Tilaiya line under the Danapur railway division of the East Central Railway zone. It is situated at Nardiganj, Sarsoo in the Gaya district in the Indian state of Bihar.
