= Nekpur railway station =

Railway station in Bihar

Nekpur

General information
- Location: State Highway 71, Simraur Baraini, Nekpur, Nalanda district, Bihar; India
- Coordinates: 24°59′45″N 85°20′20″E
- Elevation: 72 m (236 ft)
- System: Passenger train station
- Owner: Indian Railways
- Operator: East Central Railway zone
- Line: Bakhtiyarpur–Tilaiya line
- Platforms: 1
- Tracks: 1

Construction
- Structure type: Standard (on ground station)

Other information
- Status: Active
- Station code: NKPU
- Zone(s): East Central Railway zone
- Division(s): Danapur

Services
Preceding station	Indian Railways	Following station
Rajgir towards ?	East Central Railway zone Bakhtiyarpur–Tilaiya line	Natesar towards ?
Location

Nekpur railway station is a railway station on the Bakhtiyarpur–Tilaiya line under the Danapur railway division of East Central Railway zone. It is situated beside State Highway 71 at Simraur Baraini, Nekpur in Nalanda district in the Indian state of Bihar.
