= Jethian railway station =

Railway station in Bihar

Jethian

General information
- Location: Chandpura, Jethian, Gaya district, Bihar; India
- Coordinates: 24°55′46″N 85°18′51″E
- Elevation: 109 m (358 ft)
- System: Passenger train station
- Owner: Indian Railways
- Operator: East Central Railway zone
- Line: Bakhtiyarpur–Tilaiya line
- Platforms: 3
- Tracks: 1

Construction
- Structure type: Standard (on ground station)

Other information
- Status: Active
- Station code: JTIN
- Zone(s): East Central Railway zone
- Division(s): Danapur

Services
Preceding station	Indian Railways	Following station
Natesar towards ?	East Central Railway zone Bakhtiyarpur–Tilaiya line	Sarsoo towards ?
Location

Jethian railway station is a railway station on the Bakhtiyarpur–Tilaiya line under the Danapur railway division of East Central Railway zone. It is situated at Chandpura, Jethian in Gaya district in the Indian state of Bihar.
