= Dariyapur, Bhopal =

Dariyapur
- village
- Location within Madhya Pradesh Location within India
- Coordinates: 23.755461°N 77.382009°E
- Country: India
- State: Madhya Pradesh
- District: Bhopal
- Tehsil: Berasia

Population (2011)
  - Total: 145
- Time zone: UTC+5:30 (IST)
- ISO 3166 code: MP-IN
- Census code: 482132

Dariyapur is a village in the Bhopal district of Madhya Pradesh, India. It is located in the Berasia tehsil.

== Demographics ==
According to the 2011 census of India, Dariyapur has 28 households. The effective literacy rate (i.e. the literacy rate of population excluding children aged 6 and below) is 70.68%.

Demographics (2011 Census)
| | Total | Male | Female |
|---|---|---|---|
| Population | 145 | 81 | 64 |
| Children aged below 6 years | 12 | 7 | 5 |
| Scheduled caste | 14 | 8 | 6 |
| Scheduled tribe | 0 | 0 | 0 |
| Literates | 94 | 63 | 31 |
| Workers (all) | 39 | 36 | 3 |
| Main workers (total) | 25 | 22 | 3 |
| Main workers: Cultivators | 17 | 16 | 1 |
| Main workers: Agricultural labourers | 6 | 5 | 1 |
| Main workers: Household industry workers | 0 | 0 | 0 |
| Main workers: Other | 2 | 1 | 1 |
| Marginal workers (total) | 14 | 14 | 0 |
| Marginal workers: Cultivators | 0 | 0 | 0 |
| Marginal workers: Agricultural labourers | 9 | 9 | 0 |
| Marginal workers: Household industry workers | 3 | 3 | 0 |
| Marginal workers: Others | 2 | 2 | 0 |
| Non-workers | 106 | 45 | 61 |
