= Hilsa railway station =

Railway station in Bihar, India

General information
- Location: State Highway 4, Hilsa, Nalanda district, Bihar; India
- Coordinates: 25.317354°N 85.277079°E
- Elevation: 58 metres (190 ft)
- System: Indian Railways station
- Owner: Indian Railways
- Operator: East Central Railway
- Line: Fatuha–Tilaiya line
- Platforms: 2
- Tracks: Single Electric line

Construction
- Structure type: Standard (on-ground station)

Other information
- Status: Functioning
- Station code: HIL
- Zone(s): East Central Railway
- Division(s): Danapur

Services
Preceding station	Indian Railways	Following station
Kamta towards ?	East Central Railway zone Fatuha–Tilaiya line	Junair Halt towards ?
Location

Hilsa railway station is a railway station located on Fatuha–Tilaiya railway line operated by East Central Railway zone under Danapur railway division. It is situated beside State Highway 4 at Hilsa in Nalanda district in the Indian state of Bihar.
