= Dariyapur, Nalanda =

Dariyapur Kachhiyawan Dariyapur
- Village
- Location in Bihar, India
- Coordinates: 25.3430°N 85.3088°E
- Country: India
- State: Bihar
- District: Nalanda

Languages
  - Official: Hindi, Magadhi
- Time zone: UTC+5:30 (IST)
- PIN: 801302
- ISO 3166 code: IN-BR
- Lok Sabha constituency: Nalanda

Dariyapur is a village situated in the Nalanda district of Bihar state, India. It is located approximately 45 kilometres (28 mi) south of the state capital, Patna. The village is situated 9 kilometres (5.6 mi) from Hilsa (25.3175°N 85.2770°E), which serves as its local market and subdivisional headquarters. The nearest railway station is the Lohanda halt.

== Etymology ==
The name Dariyapur is derived from the words dariya (river) and pur (village), referring to its geographic location near local waterways.

== Geography and boundaries ==
Dariyapur is bordered by Madarpur to the north, Bhobhi to the northeast, Kachhiyawan (25.3365°N 85.3040°E) to the south, and Bhudkur to the east. Three local rivers—the Dorwa, Jankariya, and Sindh—merge on the western side of the village. It falls under the administration of the Kachhiyawan panchayat, with the local police station located in Nagarnausa and the post office in Kachhiyawan.

Local infrastructure includes a government school, electricity and water supply, double-lane paved roads, and internet connectivity.

== Economy ==
The local economy is predominantly agrarian. The primary crops cultivated in the village include paddy (rice), wheat, corn, and various rabi crops. Over 80% of the population belongs to the Kurmi community, traditionally engaged in agriculture. In recent years, there has been an economic shift with an increase in local businesses and government employment among residents.

== Notable people ==
- Dr. Siddharth Suman – a Senior Scientist at VTT Technical Research Centre of Finland, Marie Skłodowska-Curie Actions Fellow, and has featured in World's Top 2 % Scientists' list since 2021.
