= Natesar railway station =

Railway station in Bihar

Natesar Junction

General information
- Location: Bikaipur, Natesar, Gaya district, Bihar; India
- Coordinates: 24°57′50″N 85°16′19″E
- Elevation: 81 m (266 ft)
- System: Passenger train station
- Owner: Indian Railways
- Operator: East Central Railway zone
- Line: Bakhtiyarpur–Tilaiya line
- Platforms: 3
- Tracks: 1

Construction
- Structure type: Standard (on ground station)

Other information
- Status: Active
- Station code: NES
- Zone(s): East Central Railway zone
- Division(s): Danapur

Services
Preceding station	Indian Railways	Following station
Nekpur towards ?	East Central Railway zone Bakhtiyarpur–Tilaiya line	Jethian towards ?
Location

Natesar Junction railway station is a railway station on the Bakhtiyarpur–Tilaiya line under the Danapur railway division of East Central Railway zone. It is situated at Bikaipur, Natesar in Gaya district in the Indian state of Bihar.
