= Fatuha Junction railway station =

Railway station in Patna, Bihar, India

FATUHA JUNCTION

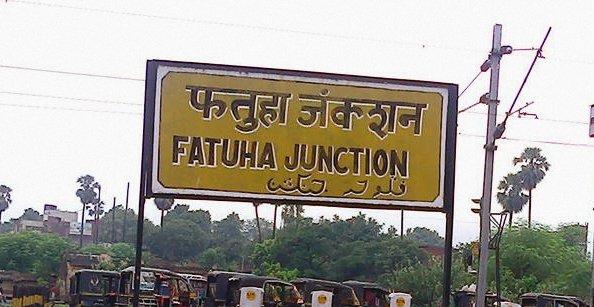

General information
- Location: Fatuha, Patna district, Bihar; India
- Coordinates: 25°30′7″N 85°18′20″E
- Elevation: 59 metres (194 ft)
- System: Indian Railways station
- Owner: East Central Railway of the Indian Railways
- Operator: Indian Railways
- Lines: Howrah–Delhi main line Fatuha–Tilaiya line
- Platforms: 7
- Tracks: 10
- Connections: Patna Sahib

Construction
- Structure type: Standard (on-ground station)

Other information
- Status: Functioning
- Station code: FUT
- Zone(s): East Central Railway
- Division(s): Danapur Division
Route map
Location
- Location within Bihar Location within India
- Interactive map of Fatuha Junction

Fatuha Junction railway station also known as Fatwa Junction, station code FUT, is a railway station in the Patna Metropolitan Region in Patna district in the Indian state of Bihar. Fatuha is connected to metropolitan areas of India, by the Delhi–Kolkata main line via Mugalsarai–Patna route. Another line for Islampur railway station which is in Nalanda District comes out from here. It is approx 44 km railway line. Railway has also passed a plan to increase this line further and connect it to Natesar railway station which is in Rajgir–Gaya railway section. Due to its location on the Howrah–Patna–Delhi main line, many Patna, Barauni-bound express trains coming from Howrah and Sealdah stop here.

== Facilities ==
The major facilities available are waiting rooms, computerized reservation facility. The station also has a tea stall and book stall. There is also a railway goods yard, used in particular for conveyance of onions.

=== Platforms ===
There are seven platforms at Fatuha Junction. The platforms are interconnected with a single foot overbridge. RELWEY 07

== Trains ==
Many passenger and express trains serve Fatuha station (as of 18 April 2012):

== Nearest airports ==
The nearest airports to Fatuha station are Lok Nayak Jayaprakash Airport, Patna, which is 26 kilometres (16 mi) away, and Gaya Airport, 101 kilometres (63 mi) distant.
