= Hilsa, Bihar =

Sub-division of Nalanda in Bihar, India

Hilsa हिलसा
- Town
- Interactive map of Hilsa

Hilsa is a town and a sub-division of the Nalanda district in the state of Bihar.

== Transportation ==
Hilsa railway station is located on Fatuha–Tilaiya railway line under Danapur railway division.

== See also ==
- Pawapuri
