= Fatuha–Tilaiya line =

Railway line in India

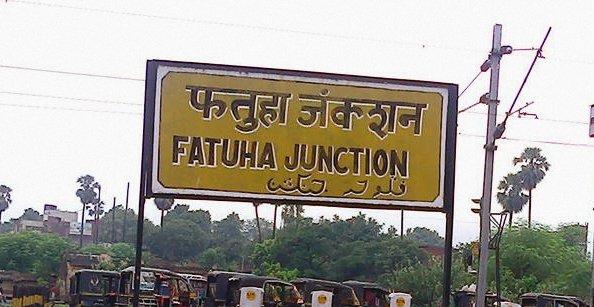
- Fatuha Junction, the starting point of Fatuha–Tilaiya line

Overview
- Status: Operational
- Owner: Indian Railways
- Termini: Fatuha; Tilaiya

Service
- Operator(s): East Central Railway

History
- Opened: 2003

Technical
- Track gauge: 5 ft 6 in (1,676 mm) broad gauge

The Fatuha–Tilaiya line is a railway line connecting Fatuha on the Howrah–Delhi main line and Tilaiya on the Gaya–Kiul line both in the Indian state of Bihar. The line was earlier known as Fatuha–Islampur line. A small portion of the line from Islampur to Natesar opened for use in 2020.

== History ==
Futwah–Islampur Light Railway was a 2 ft 6 in (762 mm)-wide narrow-gauge railway laid by Martin's Light Railways in 1922. Nearly 14 km of the 42 km (26 mi)-long Fatuha–Islampur railway line was washed away by floods 1976. As a result, no train plied on the route for many years. In 1982, Martin's Light Railways initiated resumption of train service on this line and took up restoration work. However, in 1984, they decided to close down permanently.

It was nationalised and taken over by Indian Railways in 1986. Nitish Kumar, then the railway minister laid the foundation stone for the new 1,676 mm (5 ft 6 in) railway line in 1998. This section has about 144 bridges and 36 level crossings. Hilsa will be the crossing station of this single line section. It was inaugurated in 2003 by Nitish Kumar.

The East Central Railway took up the laying of new lines in the 46 km (29 mi)-long Rajgir–Hisua-Tilaiya–Nateswar–Islampur sector and as of 2013 the work was in an advanced stage. Construction of the 68 km (42 mi) Tilaiya sector has also been taken up. The new electrified section of Islampur to Natesar was opened in 2020.

== Electrification ==
Feasibility studies for the electrification of the Manpur–Tilaiya–Kiul sector and Fatwa–Islampur–Bakhtiyarpur–Rajgir sectors were announced in the rail budget for 2010–11. The Fatuha Islampur line was electrified in 2019 while Islampur Natesar electrified section opened in 2020.
